= Feline leishmaniosis =

Parasitic disease in cats

Feline leishmaniosis (FeL)
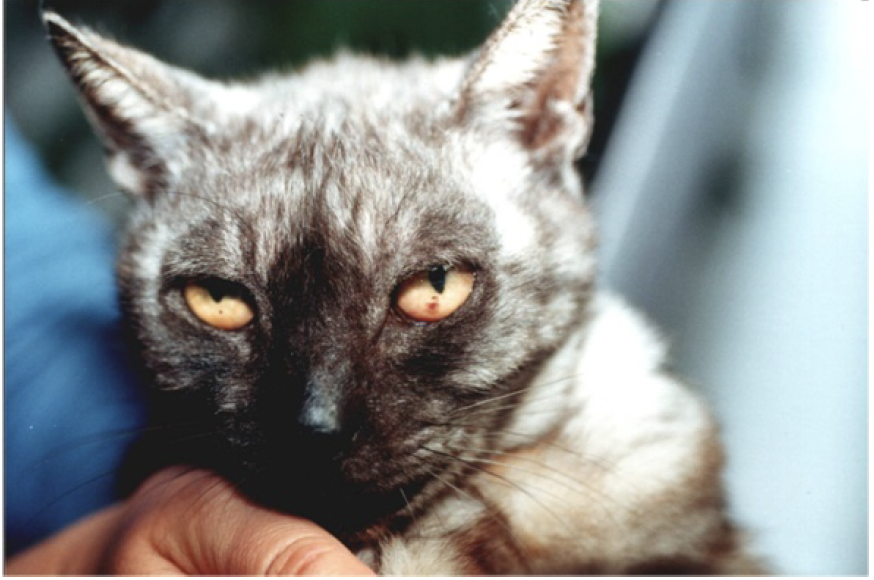
- Acute uveitis and hyphema in FeL positive cat Acute uveitis and hyphema in FeL positive cat
- Specialty: Veterinary parasitic disease
- Types: Visceral leishmaniosis, cutaneous leishmaniosis
- Host: Felis silvestris catus
- Parasite: Leishmania infantum, L. major, L. tropica, L. mexicana, L. braziliensis, L. amazonensis, L. venezuelensis, L. panamensis and L. guyanensis
- Vector: Phlebotomus, Lutzomyia
- Geographical distribution: Mediterranean bassin, Middle East, Central and South America

Feline leishmaniosis (FeL) is a parasitic disease caused by protozoa of the genus Leishmania and is transmitted through the bite of a female sand fly. Although leishmaniosis primarily affects dogs; an increasing number of cases have been reported in cats. Consequently, feline leishmaniosis is now considered an emerging disease, particularly in regions where canine leishmaniosis (CanL) is endemic.

== Transmission ==
=== Etiological agent: Leishmania spp. ===
Leishmaniosis is a disease caused by protozoa of the genus Leishmania. It has been reported that cats have been infected by at least eight Leishmania species worldwide, including L. infantum, L. major, L. tropica, L. mexicana, L. braziliensis, L. amazonensis, L. panamensis and L. guyanensis. This article focuses on L. infantum, the primary species responsible for severe disease in both dogs and cats across Europe, Asia, Africa, and the Americas.

=== Vector ===
The vector is a sandfly belonging to the genus Phlebotomus in the Old World and the genus Lutzomyia in the New World. The average size of sand flies is 3 mm. Cases of canine and feline leishmaniosis caused by L. infantum are widespread in areas where sand flies coexist.

=== Cycle of transmission and other ways of transmission non vector related ===
Leishmania species are parasites that require two hosts to complete their lifecycle: the phlebotomine sand fly and a vertebrate. This lifecycle consists of two phases: an amastigote stage—a small, round, non-flagellated intracellular form that resides within the macrophages of vertebrate hosts—, and a promastigote stage—a flagellated form that develops in the gut of sand fly vectors.

The cycle proceeds as follows: the sand fly carries extracellular promastigotes, which it transmits to a vertebrate host while feeding on its blood. Once inside the host, the promastigotes are quickly phagocytosed by macrophages and transform into amastigotes. Within these immune cells, they replicate inside intracellular vacuoles, evading the host's immune response. When a female sand fly bites an infected vertebrate, it ingests macrophages containing amastigotes. Inside the gut of the fly, the amastigotes transform back into promastigotes, developing their characteristic flagellum, which enables movement. The promastigotes then multiply and migrate to the fly's proboscis, ready to infect a new vertebrate host during the next blood meal.

Non-vectorial transmission of L. infantum, such as through blood transfusion, vertical transmission, mating, or aggressive interactions, has been documented in dogs, but it has not yet been observed in cats.

== Epidemiology ==
=== Endemic areas ===
Leishmaniosis, caused by L. infantum, is endemic in the Mediterranean Basin, including Spain, Portugal, southern France, Italy, Greece, Turkey, and Cyprus, as well as in the Middle East. The importation of infected animals can also introduce the disease into non-endemic regions, such as Northern Europe. In Central and South America and the Middle East, L. infantum coexists with other Leishmania species.

=== Prevalence ===
Since 1977, natural cases of feline leishmaniosis have been documented worldwide, primarily in Mediterranean countries, but also in the southern USA, Brazil, Central and South America, and Iran.

Feline leishmaniosis is an emerging disease that has been increasingly reported over the past two decades, especially in endemic regions. This rise in feline cases may be linked to the use of sand fly repellents in dogs, which forces the sand fly to seek alternative mammalian hosts. Additionally, the availability of more sensitive and specific diagnostic tests, advancements in feline medicine, and greater awareness among veterinarians may have contributed to the increasing number of reported FeL cases.

Over the past 25 years, approximately 100 clinical cases of FeL have been reported in Europe (including Italy, Spain, France, and Portugal), along with a few cases in Switzerland involving cats imported from endemic regions. The prevalence of Leishmania infection in cats in endemic areas varies significantly, ranging from 0% to 68.5%. PCR test positivity rates for Leishmania in blood samples range from 0.43% to 61%, while antibody prevalence varies from 3% to 59%. Despite this, the prevalence of FeL remains lower in cats than in dogs in the same areas.

=== Geographical distribution of Leishmania spp. ===
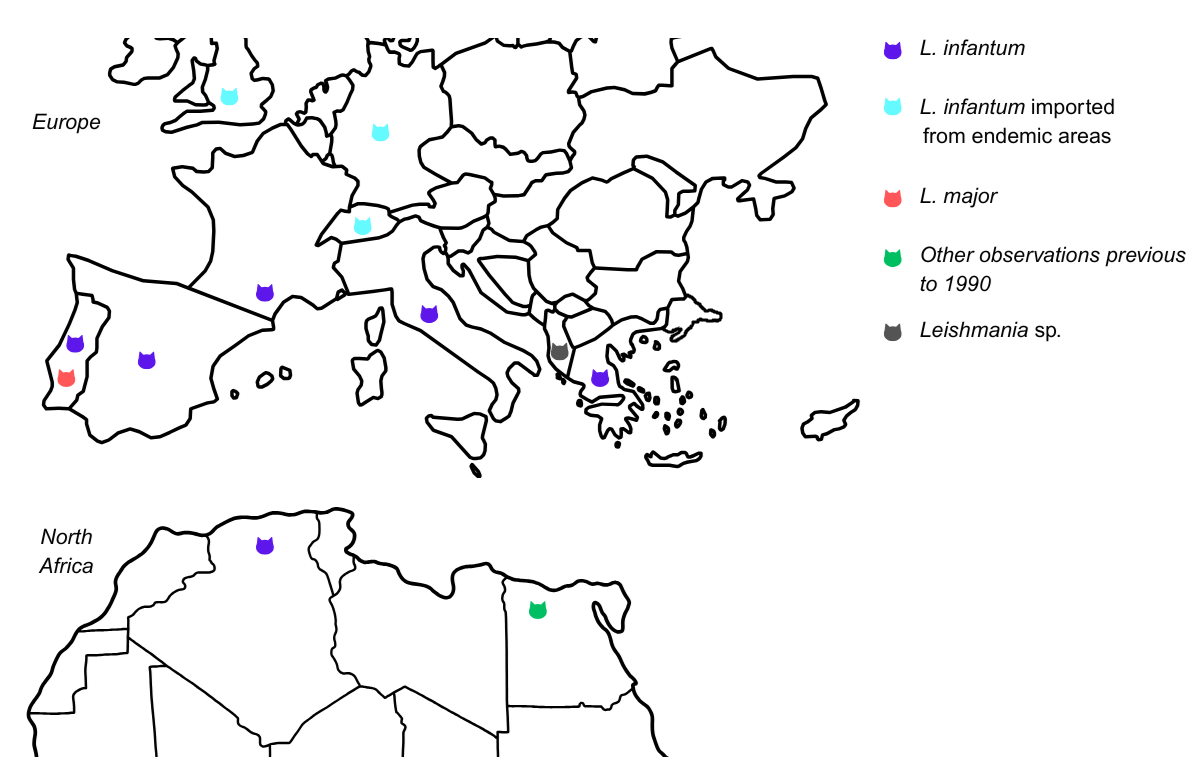
Leishmania spp. identified in cats (Felis silvetris catus) in Europe and North Africa. Modified from the feline leishmaniosis factsheets by LeishVet (https://www.leishvet.org).

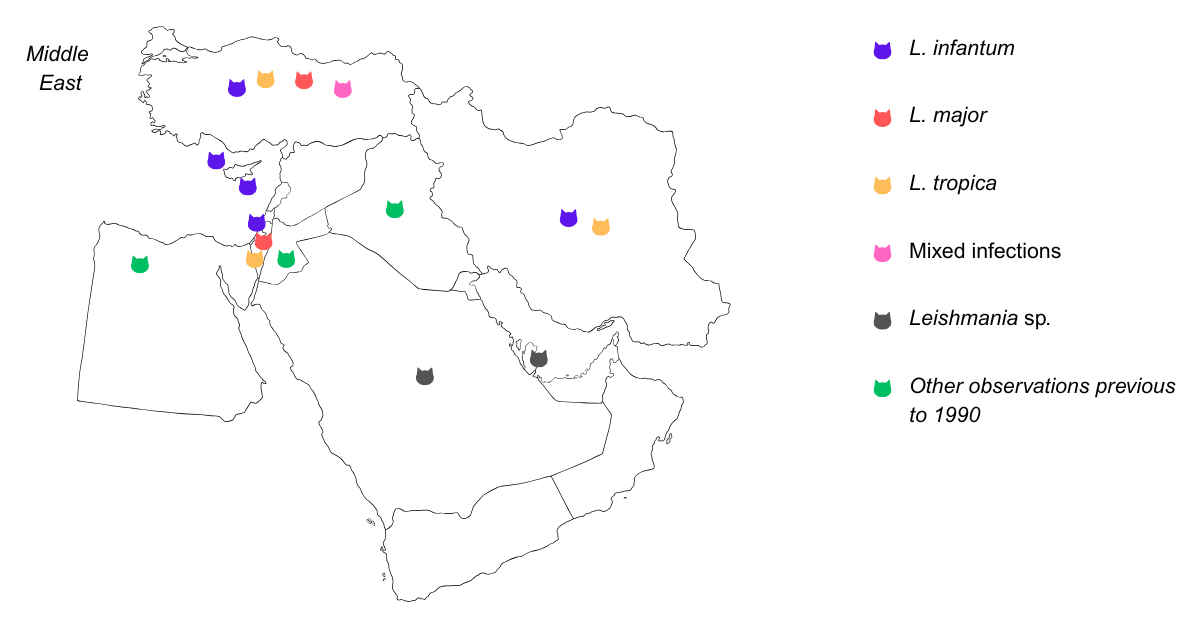
Leishmania spp. identified in cats (Felis silvetris catus) in Middle East. Modified from the feline leishmaniosis factsheets by LeishVet (https://www.leishvet.org).

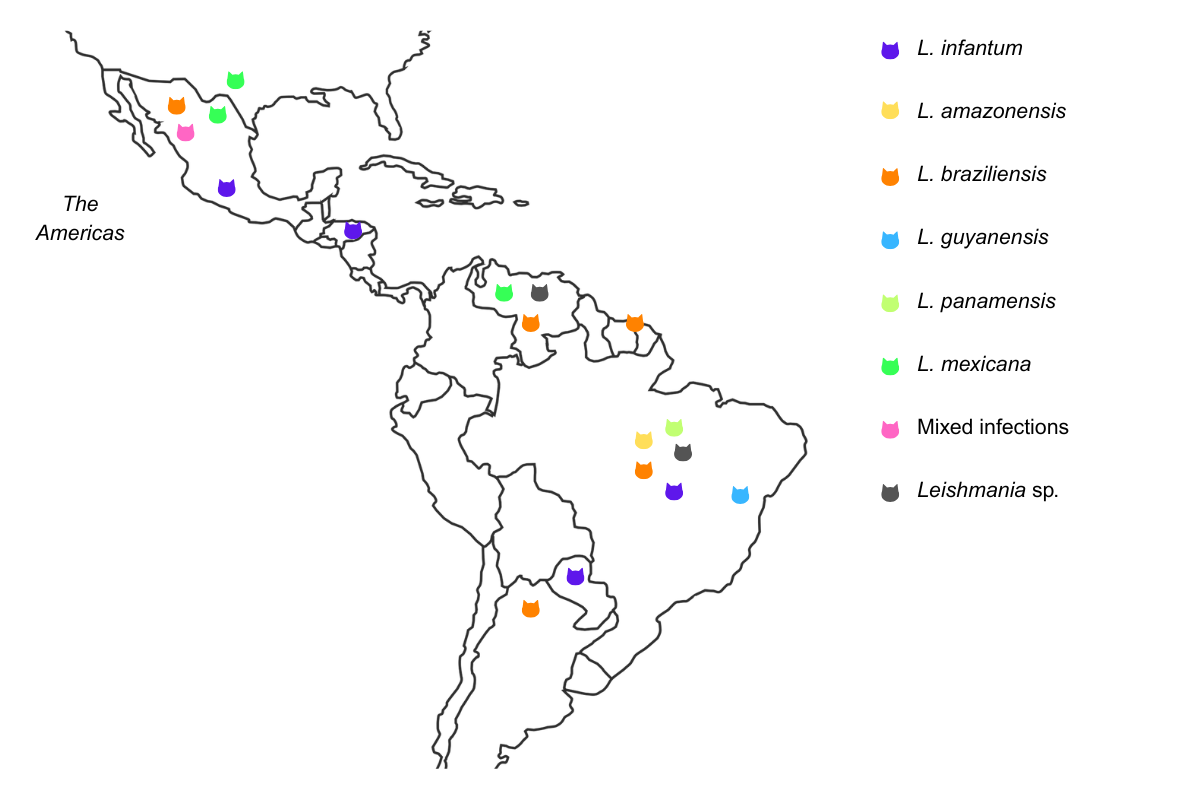
Leishmania spp. identified in cats (Felis silvetris catus) in the Americas. Modified from the feline leishmaniosis factsheets by LeishVet (https://www.leishvet.org).

=== Risk factors ===
Cats that are most susceptible to Leishmania infections are typically short-haired, between 7 and 9 years of age, male, and have access to the outdoors (either as free-roaming or shelter cats). They are more commonly found in urban areas and cohabit with dogs. Unneutered cats are also at higher risk, as are those with concurrent diseases or immunosuppressive conditions, such as a feline immunodeficiency virus (FIV) infection, which is the most common comorbidity.

=== Public health considerations ===
The L. infantum strains found in cats share the same genetic characteristics as those from humans, dogs, and sand flies. Leishmaniosis is a zoonotic disease that can affect humans, causing cutaneous, mucocutaneous and visceral leishmaniosis. Visceral leishmaniosis in humans is a life-threatening condition. Domestic dogs are typically considered the main reservoir of human L. infantum infection, with transmission occurring mainly through the bites of female sand flies. However, in recent years, cats have garnered increasing attention due to their potential role in transmission and are now considered secondary reservoir hosts. Infected cats may therefore represent an additional source of L. infantum transmission, posing a risk to humans, dogs, and other susceptible animals, including cats themselves.

== Clinical signs ==
Most infected cats remain subclinical, and the incubation period can extend for years, as seen in cats relocated from endemic to non-endemic areas, with clinical signs appearing long after they move. These signs can range from isolated dermatological lesions to ocular, renal and systemic manifestations. The disease generally follows a chronic, progressive course, with more systemic clinical signs emerging when the cats' immune system becomes compromised.

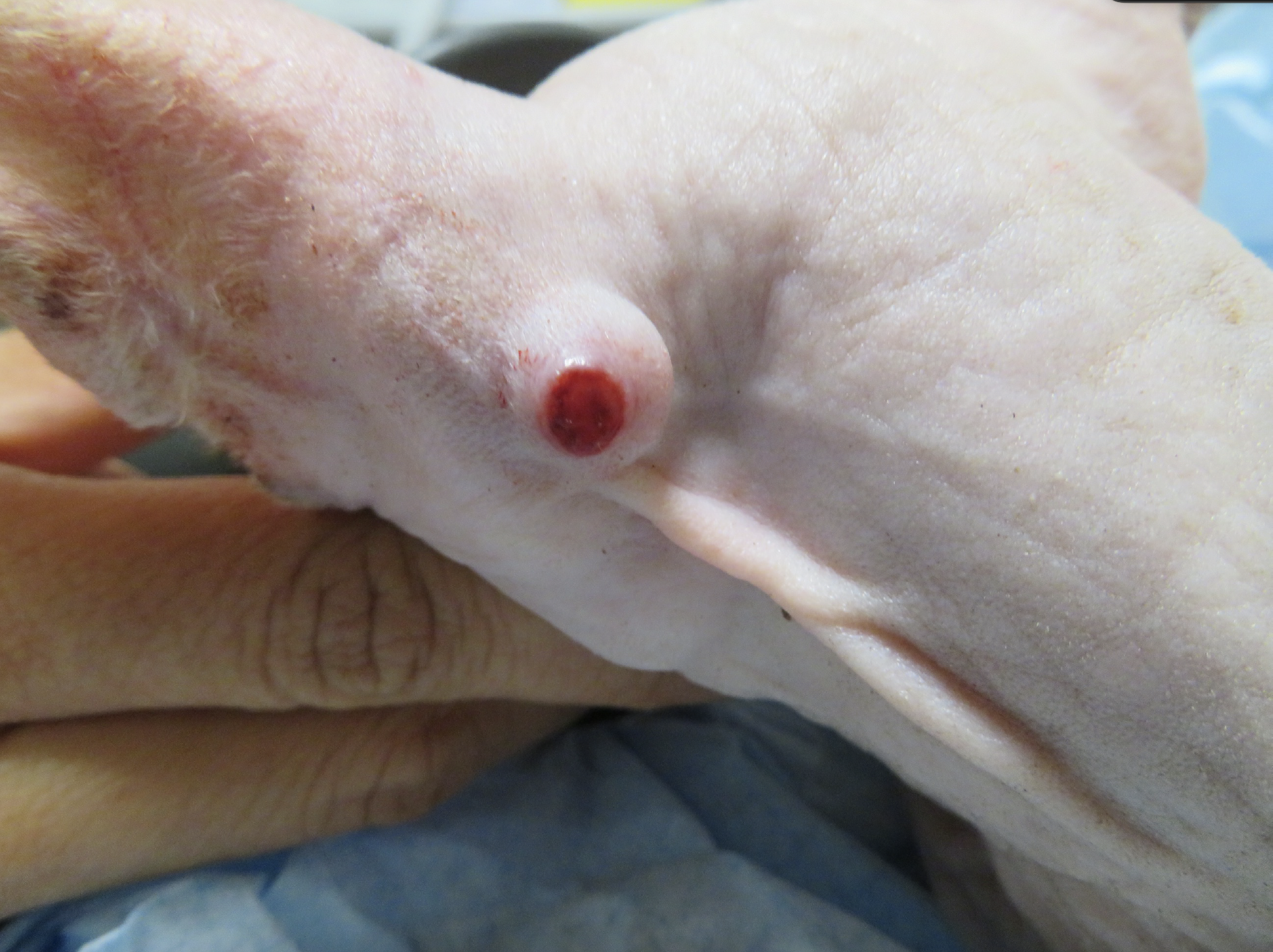
Nodular dermatitis in a Sphinx cat, on the forelimb. Courtesy of Laura Ordeix (Dermatology service of Veterinary Teaching Hospital, Autonomous University of Barcelona)

Common manifestations of FeL include cutaneous or mucocutaneous lesions and lymphadenomegaly. Other possible signs are ocular and oral lesions.

=== Cutaneous and mucocutaneous lesions ===
Dermatological lesions are the most common clinical feature of FeL, accounting for more than half of all cases.

- The most frequent manifestations are ulcers and nodules, which typically appear on the head and distal limbs. As a result, ulcerative and nodular dermatitis are the most commonly observed types.
- These are often followed by exfoliative dermatitis and alopecia.

=== Ocular lesions ===
Ocular signs usually appear alongside systemic signs.

- The most frequent ocular manifestation is anterior uveitis.
- Less common lesions include panuveitis and corneal melting ulcers (or melting keratitis).

=== Oral lesions ===
The most common oral lesions are nodules on the tongue and gingiva, often presenting as stomatitis, gingivitis, or feline chronic gingivostomatitis syndrome.

=== Systemic signs ===
- The most frequent systemic signs are lymphadenomegaly, lethargy, anorexia, and weight loss.
- Less common signs include pale or icteric mucous membranes, splenomegaly, hepatomegaly, chronic nasal discharge, upper airway obstructive syndrome, cachexia, polyuria, polydipsia, fever, diarrhea, mastitis, subcutaneous panniculitis, abortion, and epistaxis.

== Laboratory abnormalities ==
- Most common: polyclonal gammopathy, mild-to-moderate non-regenerative anemia (normocytic, normochromic), and proteinuria.
- Less common: renal azotemia, hypoalbuminemia, monocytosis, neutrophilia, and pancytopenia.

== Comorbidities ==
Comorbidities play a significant role in both susceptibility to L. infantum infection and the onset of clinical signs in cats.

Cats with impaired immune systems are more likely to develop clinical signs of the infection, especially those with pre-existing conditions. Comorbidities affecting the immune system are present in 56% to 73% of cases, with there being a 2.8 times higher risk of developing leishmaniosis when a cat has FIV. Other contributing factors include immunosuppressive conditions caused by prolonged or high-dose glucocorticoid treatment among others, neoplasia (such as epidermoid carcinoma and squamous cell carcinoma), metabolic disorders like diabetes mellitus, co-infections (including Hepatozoon felis, Candidatus mycoplasma, Toxoplasma gondii, feline leukemia virus (FeLV), and feline coronavirus (FCov)), and immune-mediated diseases (such as pemphigus). However, the association between FeL and the majority of these conditions is not well-supported by controlled studies

== Diagnostic of Feline Leishmaniosis ==
The diagnosis of FeL requires a combination of clinical, serological, cytological, and molecular techniques.

=== Clinical and laboratory findings ===
- Clinical signs compatible with the disease.
- Clinicopathological abnormalities: abnormalities in serum protein electrophoresis tests such as polyclonal gammopathy.

=== Serological testing ===
- Qualitative serology (rapid tests) for the detection of anti-L. infantum antibodies are not available for cats, unlike in dogs.
- Quantitative serology (IFAT, ELISA, DAT) is commonly used for the detection of antibody levels.

=== Cytological and histopathological evaluations ===
- Cytological analysis of: skin, mucosa, mucocutaneous lesions, lymph nodes, spleen, bone marrow, liver, palpebral conjunctiva or other affected tissues or biological fluids. Possible findings:
  - Lymphoid hyperplasia in lymphoid organs.
  - Neutrophilic and/or macrophagic inflammation.
  - Lymphoplasmacytic inflammation.
  - Visualization of amastigotes (intracellular in macrophages or extracellular).
- Cytology can also help detect comorbidities.

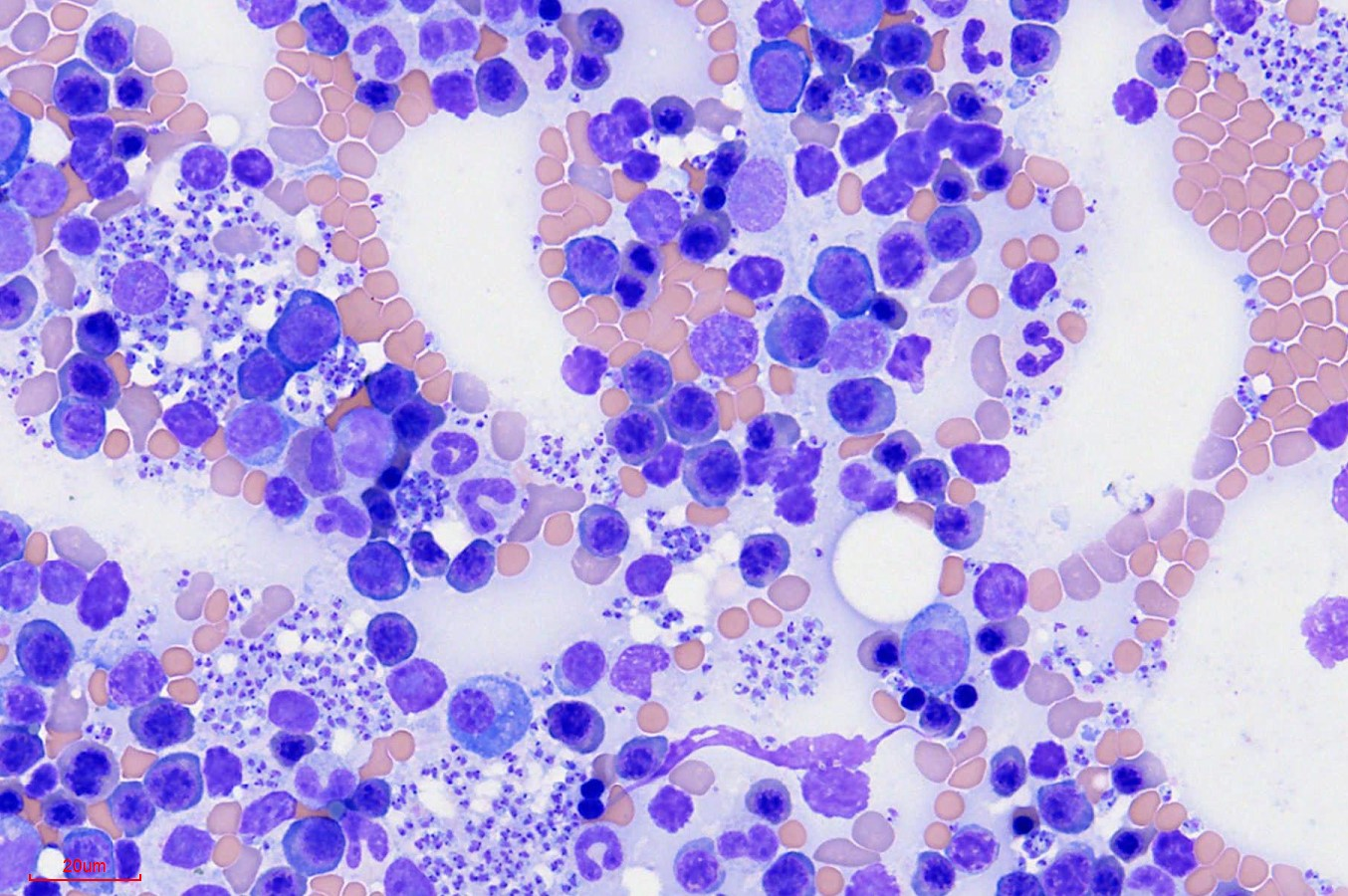
Intracellular forms of Leishmania amastigotes inside macrophages in a bone marrow cytological sample from a cat with refractory anemia. Modified Wright-giemsa stain. Courtesy of Marta Lemos and Laia Solano-Gallego (Dep. Animal Medicine and Surgery, Autonomous University of Barcelona (UAB)).

- Histopathology vs. immunohistochemistry (IHC):
  - Amastigotes are rarely visible in histology.
  - IHC is always recommended for confirmation.
  - If IHC is negative, a PCR should be performed.

=== PCR and tissue sampling ===
- Detection of parasite DNA (PCR) from: bone marrow, lymph nodes, spleen, or affected tissues or biological fluids.
- In antibody-negative or low-positive cats without tissue lesions, a PCR or cytology may still detect the parasite.

=== Importance of Comorbidities ===
Since coexisting diseases are common, a thorough investigation is necessary to confirm L. infantumas the cause of clinical signs.

To summarize, a cat is diagnosed with leishmaniosis if the following criteria are met:

- There are clinical signs and clinicopathological abnormalities that are compatible with the disease.
- Confirmation through:
  - Observation of amastigotes via cytology or histology
  - Positive IHC or PCR for Leishmania DNA.
  - Elevated anti-Leishmania antibody titers.

== Treatment in cats with clinical leishmaniosis ==
There is no specific treatment approved exclusively for cats, and the approach remains empirical, relying on off-label medications that are primarily prescribed for dogs.

The conventional anti-Leishmania treatments in cats are the following:

- Allopurinol: this is the most commonly used treatment for cats. It is administered orally, typically as monotherapy for long-term management, or in combination with meglumine antimoniate, either initially or after a course of subcutaneous injections. Allopurinol can help improve clinical signs, even in FIV-positive cats. However, there is a risk of side effects, particularly involving the kidneys, including acute kidney injury, dermatitis, pruritus, elevated liver enzymes, and xanthinuria.
- Meglumine antimoniate: this drug is administered subcutaneously and can be used alone or in combination with allopurinol. It may be challenging for owners to administer, especially if the cat is difficult to manage or uncooperative. It can cause renal complications, including acute kidney injury.

Not all drugs used to treat CanL can be used in cats, particularly those containing miltefosine (Milteforan®), which contains propylene glycol as an excipient. In cats, propylene glycol induces the formation of Heinz bodies in red blood cells and eventually leads to anemia. Therefore, it is contraindicated in cats.

In addition to these treatments, supportive care is essential, especially for cats with visceral involvement, such as hepatic failure or chronic kidney disease, given the potential hepatotoxicity and nephrotoxicity of some medications.

- Nodulectomy: surgical removal of cutaneous nodules is an option, but there is a risk of relapse of cutaneous lesions.
- Enucleation: in cases of ocular complications or poor prognosis, enucleation may be necessary.

As with dogs, Leishmania parasites may persist in treated cats, resulting in clinical improvement but not the complete elimination of the infection.

== Treatment monitoring ==
Due to the lack of controlled studies on the safety and efficacy of treatment protocols, close monitoring of cats is essential to detect potential adverse effects. Follow-up should occur every three months during treatment, with owners encouraged to promptly report any abnormalities. Monitoring during and after treatment is essential to track progress and identify any complications:

- Regular physical examinations, complete blood counts, biochemical profiles, and urinalysis with urine protein–creatinine ratio (UPC) to assess renal function, which may be affected by the medication. Ongoing monitoring of hepatic and renal functions is strongly recommended.
- Quantitative serology to track any changes in antibody titers, which should decrease during treatment and rise again in case of relapse.

Relapses are common after the discontinuation of treatment, with clinical signs and clinicopathological abnormalities potentially differing from those seen previously. Therefore, regular follow-ups every six months is key to detecting potential relapses or complications, even after treatment is completed.

== Management of healthy infected cats ==
Subclinical infected cats that are antibody-positive and/or PCR-positive for L. infantum but show no clinical signs or clinicopathological abnormalities should also be closely monitored due to their risk of developing FeL. While treatment is not recommended for these cats, regular follow-up should include:

- Testing for FIV antibodies and FeLV antigen;
- Ongoing clinical and serological monitoring;
- Enhanced follow-up if comorbidities affect the immune system or if immunosuppressive treatments are being administered.

However, in most cases of FeL, the spontaneous regression of clinical signs is frequent, which may be due to the Th1 immune response that gives rise to seroconversion followed by clinical resolution.

== Prognosis ==
With appropriate management, leishmaniosis can be controlled and lesions often regress. In well-managed cases, the prognosis is generally good, and affected cats, including those that are FIV-positive, can live for several years after diagnosis.

However, the presence of renal disease, other underlying conditions, or complications may shorten life expectancy and lead to a poor prognosis. Factors that significantly affect prognosis include renal issues (such as acute kidney injury), malignant neoplasms (such as nasal squamous cell carcinoma), FIV/FeLV co-infection, and panleukopenia.

The presence of concurrent health conditions plays a crucial role in survival, emphasizing the importance of managing these issues to improve the overall prognosis of the cat.

== Prevention ==
=== Vectorial transmission ===
Since vaccines are currently available only for dogs, the primary method of preventing leishmaniosis in cats is the use of topical insecticides. Repellents are particularly important for cats living in or traveling to endemic areas. However, most pyrethrin and pyrethroid-based products commonly used in dogs sold as spot-ons or collars (such as permethrin and deltamethrin) are toxic to cats and should be avoided. The only safe and licensed pyrethroid formulation for cats is a collar combining flumethrin (4.5%) and imidacloprid (10%). To date, only a Seresto® brand collar can be used for cats. These collars have shown a 75% efficacy in reducing infection, while also protecting against ticks and fleas.

In addition to topical treatments, other preventive measures include keeping cats indoors from dusk to dawn during the sand fly season (April to November in the Mediterranean region), using physical barriers around homes and shelters to prevent sand fly from entering (such as insecticide-impregnated mosquito nets), and spraying approved insecticide solutions like fluralaner in areas where both humans and animals reside.

The ideal prevention strategy depends on the cat's lifestyle:

- Indoor cats: limited risk of exposure, but precautionary measures are still recommended.
- Outdoor cats: increased risk, requiring stronger preventive measures.
- Traveling cats: extra care is needed when traveling to endemic regions.

=== Horizontal transmission ===
To prevent horizontal (non-vectorial) transmission of this infection, regular testing is recommended for cats in breeding programs or those eligible for blood transfusions. Screening should include antibody detection and a PCR. Infected cats must be excluded from breeding and blood donation in order to prevent further spread.

In endemic regions, minimally invasive screening methods, such as serology and blood, lymph node, or conjunctival swabs for PCR, should be used. However, the sensitivity of these tests may be limited. Screening is also crucial before initiating immunosuppressive treatments or relocating cats to non-endemic areas.

After returning from endemic regions, thorough clinical evaluation and testing are necessary to identify any potential infections.

== Difference between CanL and FeL ==
Canine leishmaniosis (CanL) and feline leishmaniosis show significant differences in prevalence, susceptibility, and clinical manifestation. Cats appear to be less susceptible to L. infantum infection compared to dogs, even in endemic regions with frequent exposure .

This relative resistance to L. infantum infection compared to dogs is likely due to differences in their immune response. Their defense mechanisms include the production of protective antibodies and a strong Th1 immune response, primarily driven by interferon-gamma (IFN-γ). IFN-γ plays a crucial role in activating macrophages, enhancing their ability to eliminate Leishmania infantum through the production of nitric oxide (NO). A robust Th1 response, characterized by high IFN-γ levels, is generally associated with better infection control and reduced disease progression. Some studies also suggest that the Th2 response in cats may contribute to protection. Additionally, seropositive cats (those that test positive for the parasite but do not develop disease) may produce higher IFN-γ levels, which helps to regulate the immune system and prevent the disease from progressing. In addition, it appears that the complement system may play a role, and the complement system in cats seems to be qualitatively more effective—especially through the lectin pathway—which could contribute to their natural resistance to L. infantum, in contrast to dogs, which are more vulnerable.

Clinically, the disease manifests differently between species. In dogs, leishmaniosis typically presents as exfoliative dermatitis, often followed by ulcerative and nodular forms. In contrast, cats normally display nodular or ulcerative forms. Interestingly, it is more common for cats to present with respiratory and oral clinical signs. Additionally, FeL cases are often associated with underlying immunosuppressive conditions, especially feline immunodeficiency virus (FIV). As a result, FeL remains relatively uncommon, even in areas where CanL is prevalent.

== Conclusive summary ==
Feline leishmaniosis, caused by L. infantum, is an emerging disease in regions where canine leishmaniosis is endemic, particularly around the Mediterranean Basin. In these areas, it is crucial to consider FeL as part of the differential diagnosis when cats present with skin, ocular, or other lesions suggestive of Leishmania infection, to avoid misdiagnosis. This is particularly important in immunocompromised cats with systemic disease or with persistent hematological abnormalities despite treatment. However, there is limited evidence-based knowledge on FeL. The understanding of its transmission, immunopathogenesis, development, management, and prevention remains in its early stages, with treatment approaches primarily based on empirical methods.

== Association of veterinarians specialized in leishmaniosis in canine and feline species ==
LeishVet is a group of veterinary scientists from academic institutions in Mediterranean and North American countries whose focus is on the clinical and scientific aspects of canine and feline leishmaniosis.
