= List of parasitic organisms =

This is an incomplete list of organisms that are true parasites upon other organisms.

== Endoparasites ==
(endo = within; parasites that live inside their hosts)

=== Plants ===
- Rafflesia
- Cuscuta
- Mistletoe

=== Parasitic worms ===
These can be categorized into three groups; cestodes, nematodes and trematodes. Examples include:

- Acanthocephala
- Ascariasis (roundworms)
- Cestoda (tapeworms) including: Taenia saginata (human beef tapeworm), Taenia solium (human pork tapeworm), Diphyllobothrium latum (fish tapeworm) and Echinococcosis (hydatid tapeworm)
- Clonorchis sinensis (the Chinese liver fluke)
- Dracunculus medinensis (Guinea worm)
- Enterobius vermicularis (pinworm)
- Filariasis
- Hookworm
- Loa loa
- Onchocerciasis (river blindness)
- Schistosomiasis
- Strongyloides stercoralis
- Tapeworm
- Toxocara canis (dog roundworm)
- Trichinella
- Whipworm

=== Protozoans ===
- Entamoeba histolytica and Entamoeba coli - can cause Amoebiasis
- Acanthamoeba
- Balamuthia mandrillaris
- Giardia
- Cyclospora cayetanensis
- Cryptosporidium
- Toxoplasma gondii
- Leishmania - L. tropica, L. donovani, and L. mexicana are known to cause Leishmaniasis.
- Plasmodium - causes the fatal disease, Malaria. P. falciparum, P. vivax, and P. malariae are pathogenic to humans.
- Babesia

=== Fungi ===
- Gymnosporangium and other rusts
- Pyrenophora teres
- Cordyceps

=== Arthropods ===
- Dendrogaster
- Pentastomida

== Ectoparasites ==
(ecto = outside; parasites that live on but not within their hosts, for example, attached to their skin)

=== Arthropoda ===
- Parasitiformes
  - Ixodida (ticks)
  - Varroa destructor
- Cyamidae (whale lice)
- Cymothoa exigua (tongue-eating louse)
- Amblyoponinae (Dracula ants)
- Bed bugs
- Culicidae (mosquitoes)
- Calyptra (moth) (vampire moths)
- Hippoboscoidea
  - Tsetse fly
  - Lipoptena
  - Melophagus ovinus, (sheep keds) and relatives
- Lernaeocera branchialis (cod worm)
- Oestridae (bot flies)
  - Human botfly
  - Cuterebra fontinella (mouse botfly)
- Phlebotominae (sand flies)
- Phthiraptera (Lice)
  - Body louse
  - Crab louse
  - Head louse
- Pinnotheridae (Pea crabs)
  - Pea crab
  - New Zealand pea crab
- Sacculina
- Siphonaptera (fleas)
- Sternorrhyncha, (aphids) and relatives
- Tabanidae (horse flies)
- Tantulocarida
- Triatominae (kissing bugs)

=== Annelids ===
- Hirudinea (some leeches)

=== Monogeneans ===
Monogeneans are flatworms, generally ectoparasites on fish.

- Calydiscoides euzeti
- Lethacotyle vera
- Protocotyle euzetmaillardi
- Pseudorhabdosynochus spp.

=== Mollusks ===
- Cancellaria cooperii
- Glochidium
- Pyramidellidae
- †Platyceratidae

=== Chordates ===
- Cookiecutter shark
- Candiru (vampire fish of Brazil, a facultative parasite)
- Lampreys
- Male Deep sea anglers
- False cleanerfish
- Pearlfish
- Hood mockingbird
- Oxpeckers (cleaning symbiosis)
- Snubnosed eel
- Vampire bat
- Vampire finch
- Cuckoo (brood parasite)
- Cowbird (brood parasite)
- Whydah (brood parasite)

=== Plants ===
- Mistletoe
- Monotropa uniflora
- Certain orchids
- Nuytsia
- Orobanche (broomrape)
- Santalum album
- Certain plants with albinism

=== Fungi ===
- Corn smut
- Certain mushrooms
- Asterotremella albida

== See also ==
- List of fictional parasites
