= Novy–MacNeal–Nicolle medium =

Novy–MacNeal–Nicolle medium (NNN) in microbiology is a culture medium used to grow Leishmania – needed when the amastigotes are not found in sufficient quantities by scraping the growth substrate. It consists of 0.6% sodium chloride (NaCl) added to a simple blood agar slope. NNN can also be used to grow Trypanosoma cruzi
