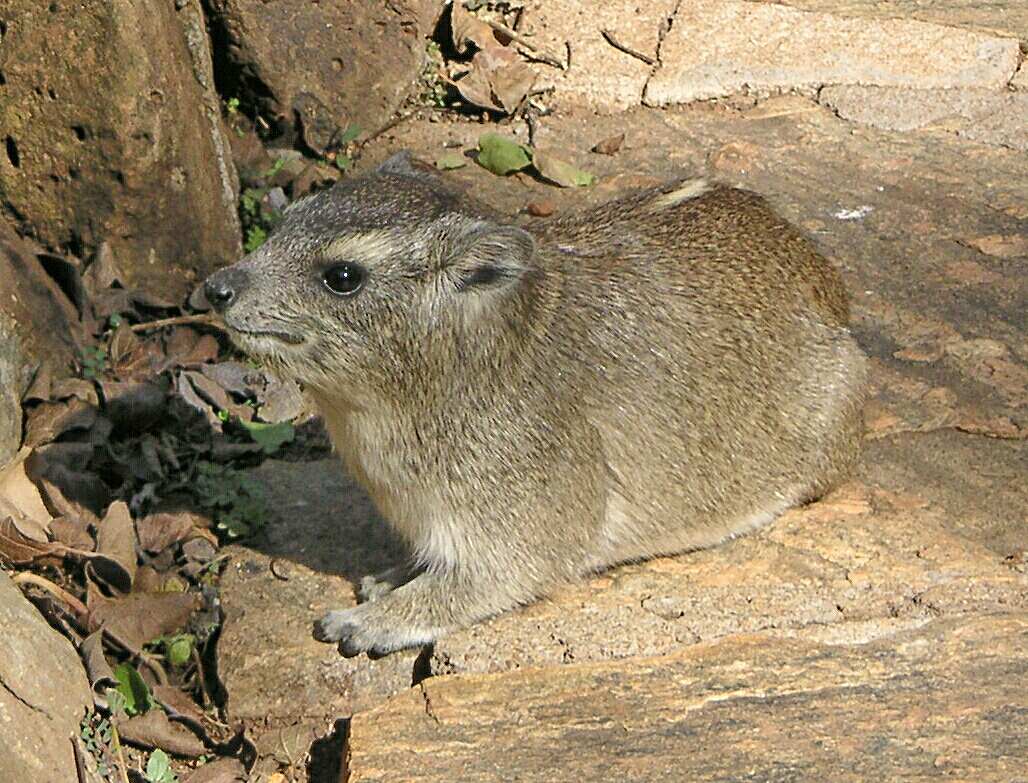

Conservation status
- Least Concern (IUCN 3.1)

Scientific classification
- Kingdom: Animalia
- Phylum: Chordata
- Class: Mammalia
- Order: Hyracoidea
- Family: Procaviidae
- Genus: Heterohyrax; J.E. Gray, 1868
- Species: H. brucei

Binomial name
- Heterohyrax brucei (J.E. Gray, 1868)

Subspecies
- 25, see text
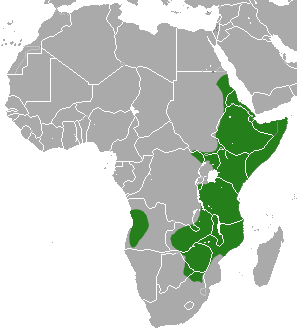
- Yellow-spotted rock hyrax range

= Yellow-spotted rock hyrax =

Species of mammal native to Africa

The yellow-spotted rock hyrax or bush hyrax (Heterohyrax brucei) is a species of hyrax in the family Procaviidae. It is found in Angola, Botswana, Burundi, the Democratic Republic of the Congo, southern Egypt, Eritrea, Ethiopia, Kenya, Malawi, Mozambique, Rwanda, Somalia, northern South Africa, South Sudan, Sudan, Tanzania, Uganda, Zambia, and Zimbabwe. Its natural habitats are dry savanna and rocky areas. Hyrax comes from the Greek word ὕραξ, or shrew-mouse.

== Naming and classification ==
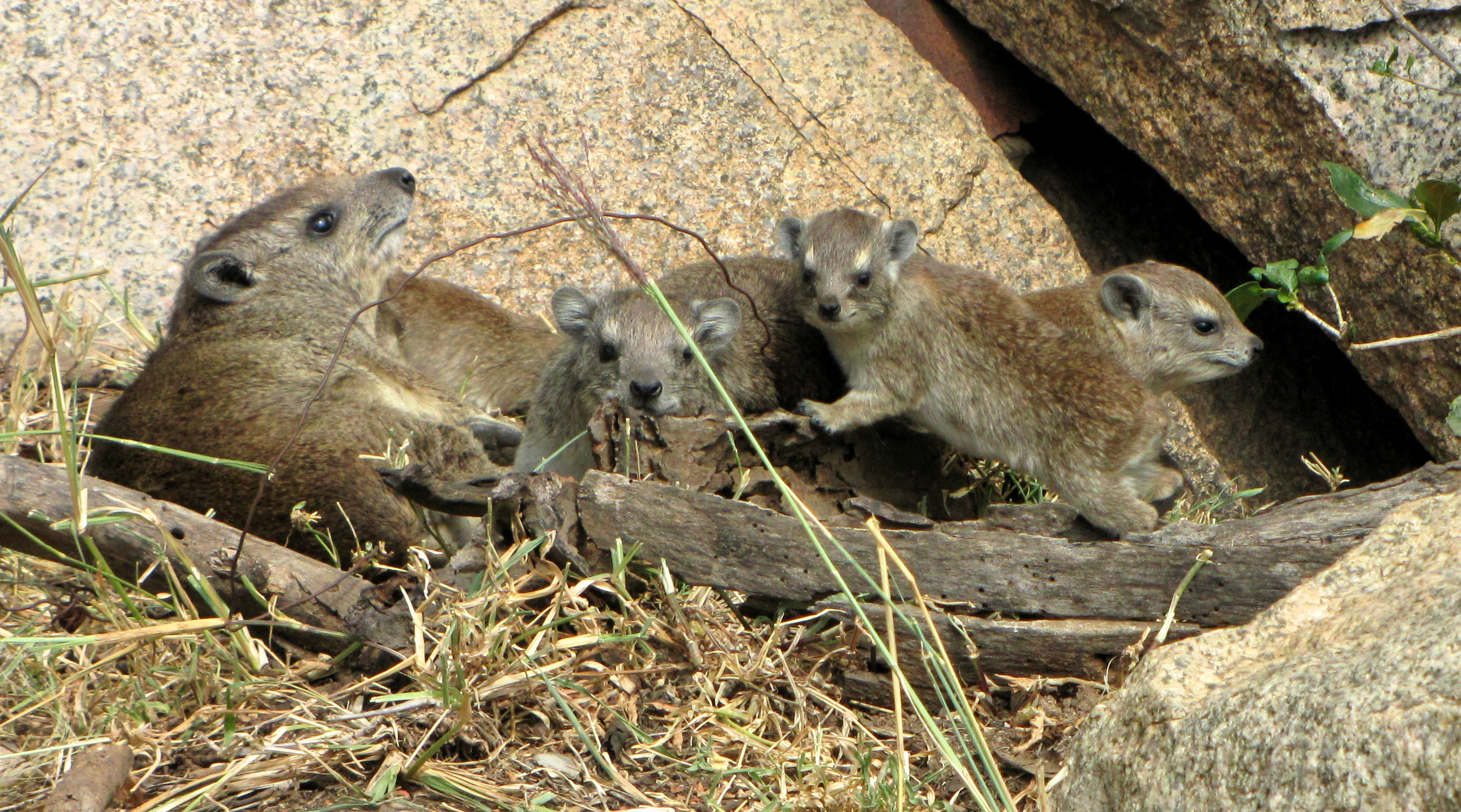
Family, Serengeti, Tanzania

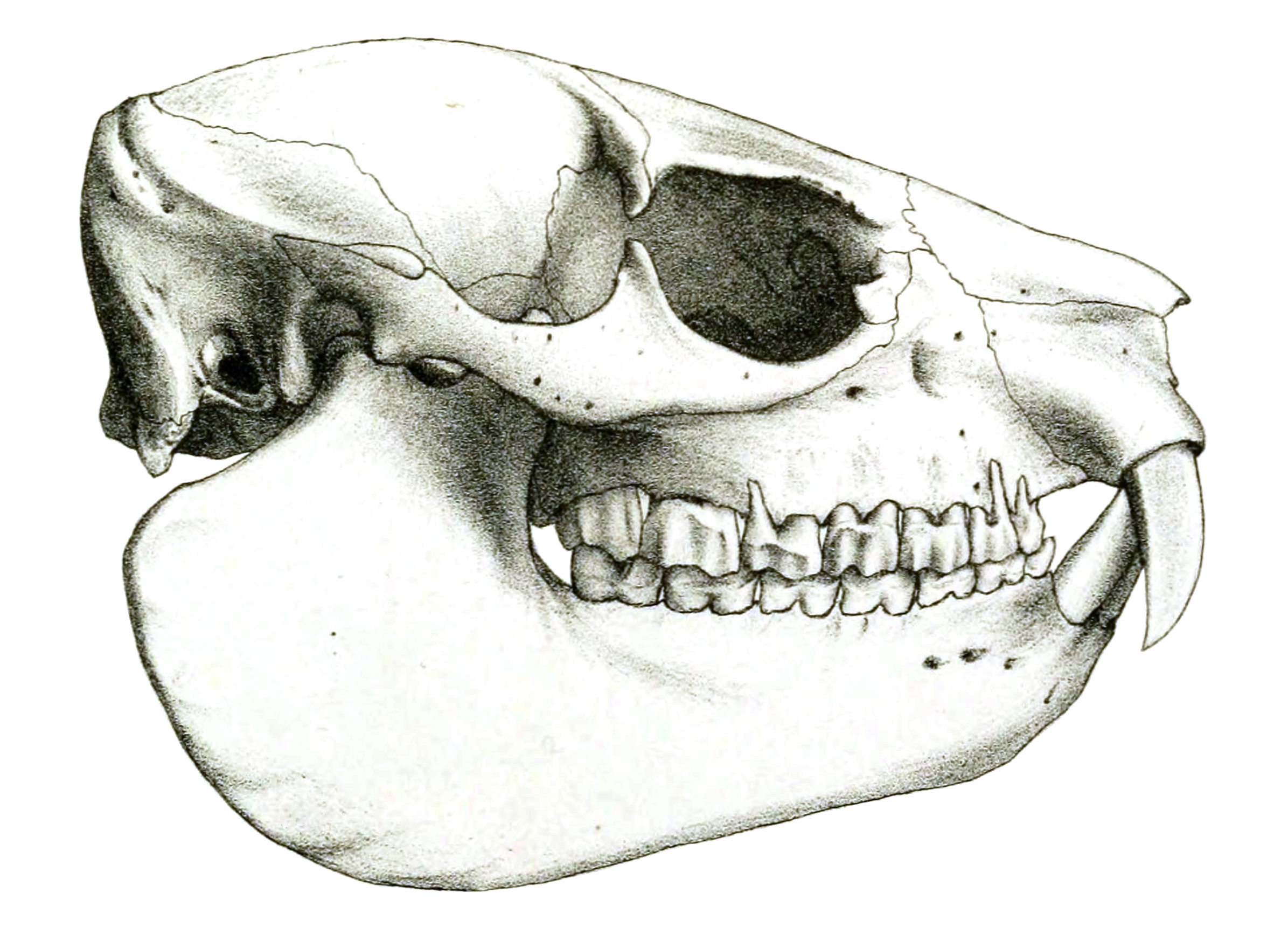
Skull

Heterohyrax is a bush hyrax, as opposed to a rock hyrax (Procavia capensis) or a tree hyrax (Dendrohyrax). Although difficult to distinguish in the field, the bush hyrax differs from the rock hyrax in being smaller and less heavily built and having a narrower muzzle.

Hyraxes have molariform teeth that are brachydont, meaning they have short crowns and well-developed roots. The bush hyrax has an upper premolar series that is the same length as the molar series, while the rock hyrax has a shorter upper premolar series and the tree hyrax has a longer upper premolar series. Hyraxes have upper tusk-like upper incisors and four lower incisors that are comb-like and used to groom the fur. While the incisors do not differentiate between the hyraxes, they do differ between sexes. Males have rigid upper incisors, while the females have rounded upper incisors. Furthermore, the male sex organs also differ greatly between these three genera of hyraxes, which may inhibit them from interbreeding.

Common names for the bush hyrax include yellow-spotted hyrax, bush hyrax, hogger hyrax, yellow-spotted rock hyrax, and daman de steppe (French).

The genus Heterohyrax contains one extinct species, H. auricampensis, and one living, H. brucei. Within H. brucei are 25 recognized subspecies.

Heterohyrax belongs to Afrotheria, the superordinal clade of mammals that includes elephant shrews, aardvarks, golden moles, elephants, and sirenians.

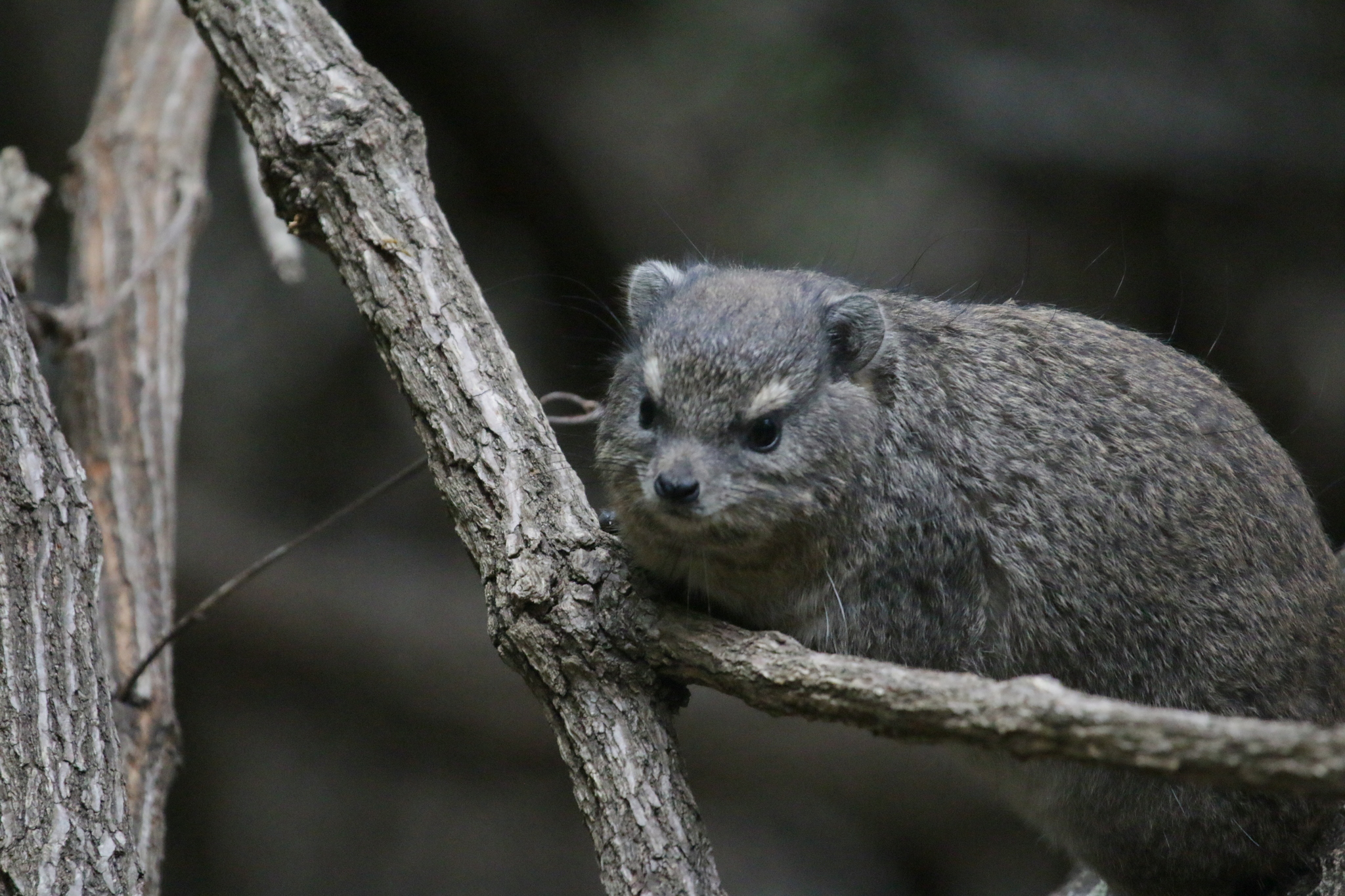
South Africa

== Subspecies ==
(alphabetically arranged)

- H. b. albipes
- H. b. antineae (no consensus if this subspecies is conspecific)
- H. b. bakeri
- H. b. bocagei
- H. b. brucei (type species)
- H. b. chapini (no consensus if this subspecies is conspecific)
- H. b. dieseneri
- H. b. frommi
- H. b. granti
- H. b. hindei
- H. b. hoogstraali
- H. b. kempi
- H. b. lademanni
- H. b. manningi
- H. b. mossambicus
- H. b. muenzneri
- H. b. princeps
- H. b. prittwitzi
- H. b. pumilus
- H. b. ruddi
- H. b. rudolfi
- H. b. somalicus
- H. b. ssongeae
- H. b. thomasi
- H. b. victorianjansae

== Conservation ==
The Heterohyrax is on the IUCN least concern list for threatened species. It has no major threats, though it is locally hunted in some regions. Communities within the Matobo hills are reliant upon the hyraxes as a main protein source. Other people groups have been known to hunt the hyrax when other food sources are scarce.

== Population and habitat ==
Populations of the bush hyrax are native to Africa. They have been observed to live as far north as Sudan and Eritrea and east throughout the Horn of Africa. They also live as far south as the Limpopo Province in South Africa. Additionally, isolated populations are known to be in the south-west of the Democratic Republic of Congo and Angola.

Their habitats are restricted to rocky kopjes (rocky, elevated areas on a generally flat plain), sheer rock faces (krantzes), and piles of large boulders. They live in openings with at least 1 m^{2} (11 sq ft) of space and a height of 11 cm (4.3 in). Rocky habitats are suitable living spaces because there are many crevices for the hyraxes to nest, and seek shelter from weather and predators. They also live at varying elevations from sea level to 3,800 m (12,500 ft).

Studies have reported bush hyraxes to live in colonies of sometimes hundreds of animals with population densities ranging between 20 and 53 individuals per hectare. Family units are polygynous, usually five to 34 animals with one dominant male and three to seven females and many juveniles of both sexes. Other adult males tend to live on the periphery of the territory of dominant males.

In the Matobo National Park, Zimbabwe, populations have experienced considerable declines since 1978. Droughts in the park are considered as a causal factor in this decline. However, predation is also reported to be high in this region, and a 52–61% mortality rate within the first year of life was reported for the bush hyrax.

The bush hyraxes, H. brucei, are known to live with rock hyraxes, Procavia capensis and Procavia johnstoni However, different species of hyraxes do not interbreed because their sex organs vary significantly. Some behaviors observed in populations of rock and bush hyraxes include caring for each other's young by sharing nurseries and inhabiting the same rock crevices. The associations observed between these hyraxes is variable and in Zimbabwe, they often overlap habitats near parturition (the time of giving birth).

== Morphology ==
=== Name-giving feature ===
The name-giving feature of the yellow-spotted rock hyrax is a dorsal gland located on the lower back beneath a raised skin patch about 1.5 cm (0.6 in) long and surrounded by erectile hairs. However, not all Heterohyrax species have a dorsal gland. The secretions of the gland stain a dorsal spot of reddish-ochre to a dirty white coloration, but most commonly appears yellow. The gland is associated with sexual arousal and also plays a role in maternal recognition by young. The bush hyrax also has a pale patch of hair above the eyes, where glandular tissue also occurs. Glandular tissue also occurs under the chin and in the genital area.

=== General features ===
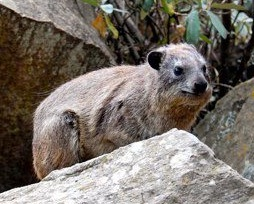
A bush hyrax in Hell's Gate National Park, Kenya

A study conducted in Zimbabwe showed weights to range from 2.3 to 3.6 kg (5.1 to 7.9 lb), while another study conducted in the Serengeti National Park, Tanzania found weights to be slightly lower at 1.3 to 2.4 kg (2.9 to 5.3 lb). Males and females on average do not vary in size, but sometimes the females will be slightly larger than the males. They have short legs, a rudimentary tail and round ears. Their lateral and dorsal coloration tends to be grey among colonies found in arid regions and a dark reddish-brown among those found in more mesic regions. Their pelts are thick and course with guard hairs measuring up to 30 mm. Additionally they have vibrissae that provide tactile feedback located above the eyes, under the chin, along the back and sides, on the abdomen and on the fore- and hind limbs. These vibrissae, or whiskers, measure 90 mm (3.5 in) long on the snout, and 70 mm (2.8 in) elsewhere.

Other noted features include: the Jacobsen's organ which is as a specialized olfactory structure, a compartmentalized stomach into nonglandular cranial and glandular caudal sections, and a vertebral column that is convex from neck to tail.

=== Specialized characteristics ===
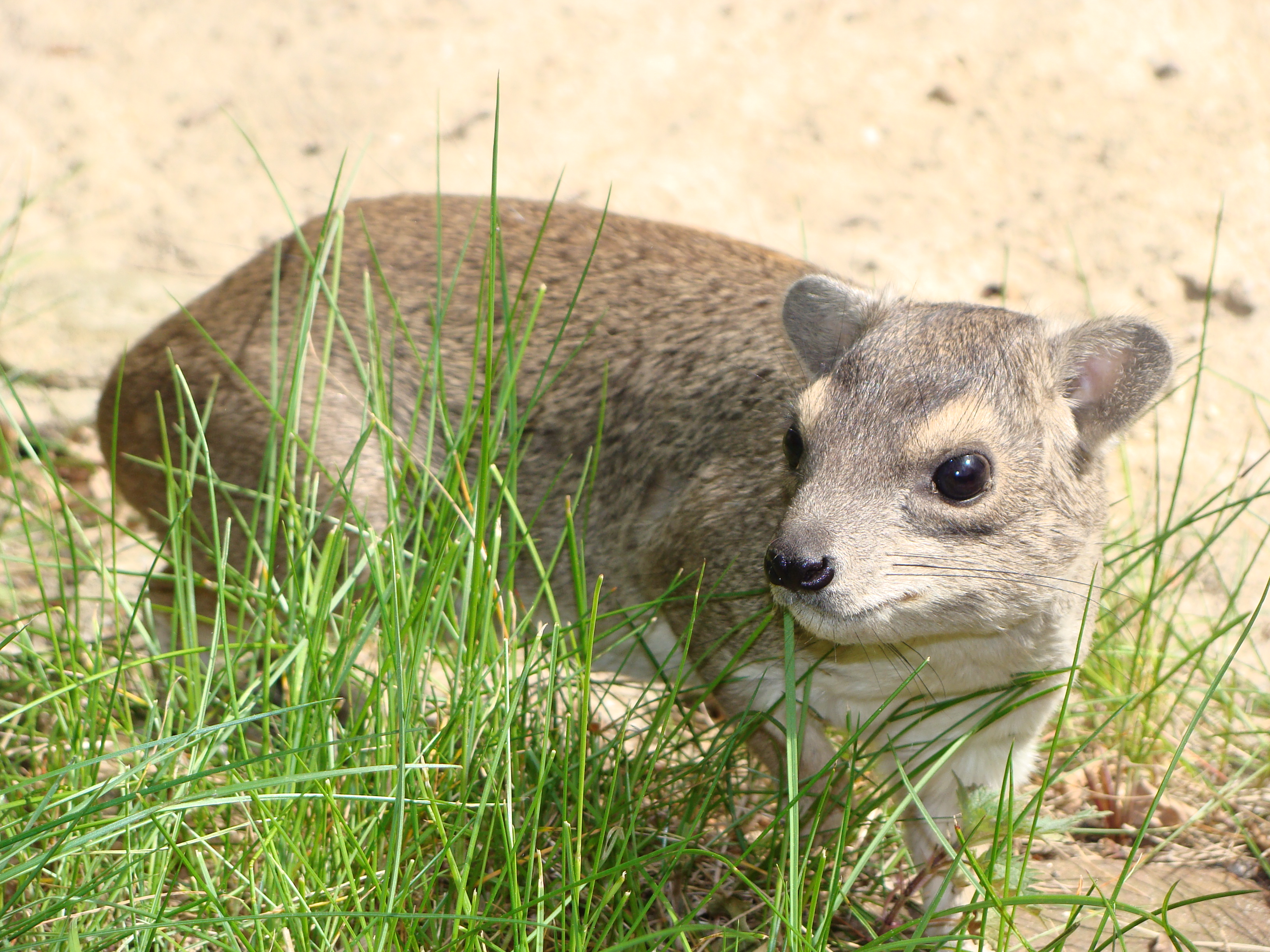
Bush hyrax

The bush hyrax also has specialized glands on the pads of their feet that increase their grip which helps them navigate slick rock surfaces. The pads of their feet are flat and naked while secretions from these glands keep the pads moist. The muscles in the feet contract the foot into a cup-like shape, thus resulting in a suction cup-like effect. Hyraxes are known to be excellent climbers due to this specialization and it has even been observed that if shot, they will remain perpendicular on the rock surface as if stuck to the surface. The forepaw has three well-developed digits, a rudimentary thumb, and a small fifth digit. Their digits have flat, hoof-like nails, except for the second digit, which has long, curved claw that is used for grooming. The hind paw is similar except lacking a big toe and the fifth digit is rudimentary.

The bush hyraxes have an umbraculum in the pupil of their eye extending from the iris. This enables them to stare into the sun and watch for aerial predators while they sun bask.

The bush hyrax has a specialized kidney to compensate for the lack of water available in their natural habitat. This enables them to conserve water by producing a highly concentrated urine. The urine is so concentrated that is leaves a crystalline residue called klipstreet or hyraceum that is commonly found on the rock outcroppings where they reside.

=== Reproductive ===
The penis of the bush hyrax is complex and distinct from that of the other hyrax genera. It has a short, thin appendage within a cup-like glans penis and measures greater than 6 cm when erect. Additionally, it has been observed that the bush hyrax also has a greater distance between the anus and preputial opening in comparison to other hyraxes. The testes are permanently intra-abdominal and vary in size depending upon season.

Females have four mammae, two pectoral and two inguinal. They also have a uterus that is bicornuate, and a placenta that is chorioallantoic.

=== Genetic variability ===
Genetic variation analysis suggests that females have a higher rate of gene transfer which may be due to greater migration success and longer migration distances of females than males. Data also show that females immigrate into colonies more frequently than males.

== Life cycle ==
The bush hyrax has been recorded to live over 10 years in the wild, with an average lifespan of 12 years. Males and females reach sexual maturity between 16 and 17 months of age.

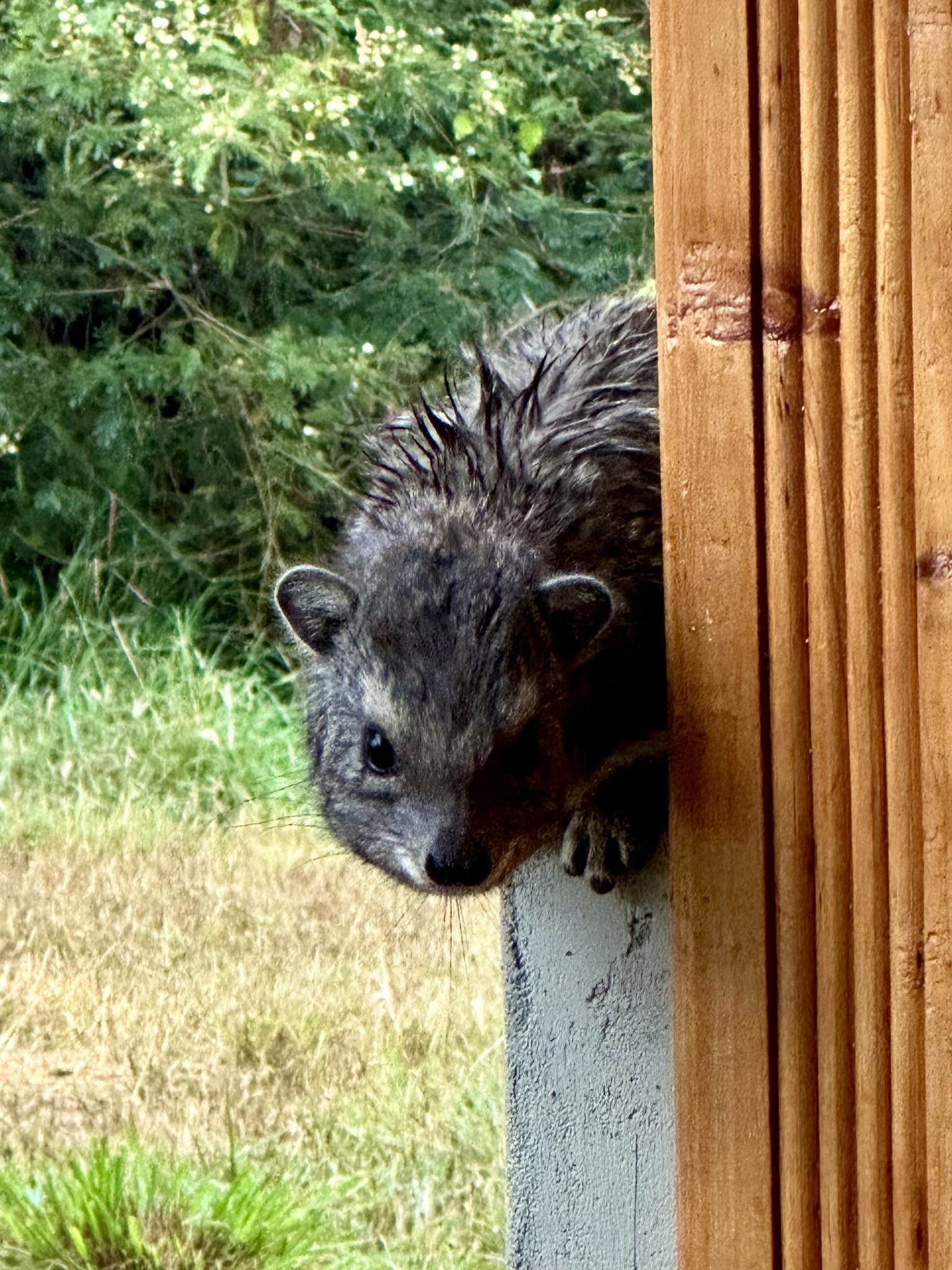
Bush hyrax, Kenya

Sexually mature females breed annually and breeding seasons vary based on geographic location. Peak birth rates among colonies in Kenya occur between February and March, in Zimbabwe March, and in the Serengeti, Tanzania between December and January. Breeding seasons are 7–8 months prior to when these peak birth rates have been observed based on length of gestation. Females of colonies living at high elevation enter estrus as the photoperiod increases. Their estrus cycle is 1–5 days. For example, in the Serengeti, there is a discrete mating season of seven weeks in which females with enter estrus several times for several days each. This also synchronizes births among colonies, with all breed females giving birth within three week of each other. Litter sizes vary from 1 to 3 young but average between 1.6 and 2.1 depending on geographic location. They are born weighing 220 to 230 g (7.8 to 8.1 oz) and are open-eyed, furred, and able to follow adults out of the nest within several hours of birth. Young are suckled for 1–6 months before they are weaned.

Juvenile mortality rate is high due to predation. Rock pythons, leopards, birds of prey, mongooses, and other small carnivores prey upon the bush hyrax. One study conducted between 1992 and 1995 estimated that juvenile mortality was 52.4–61.3% per annum.

== Behavior ==
=== Feeding habits ===
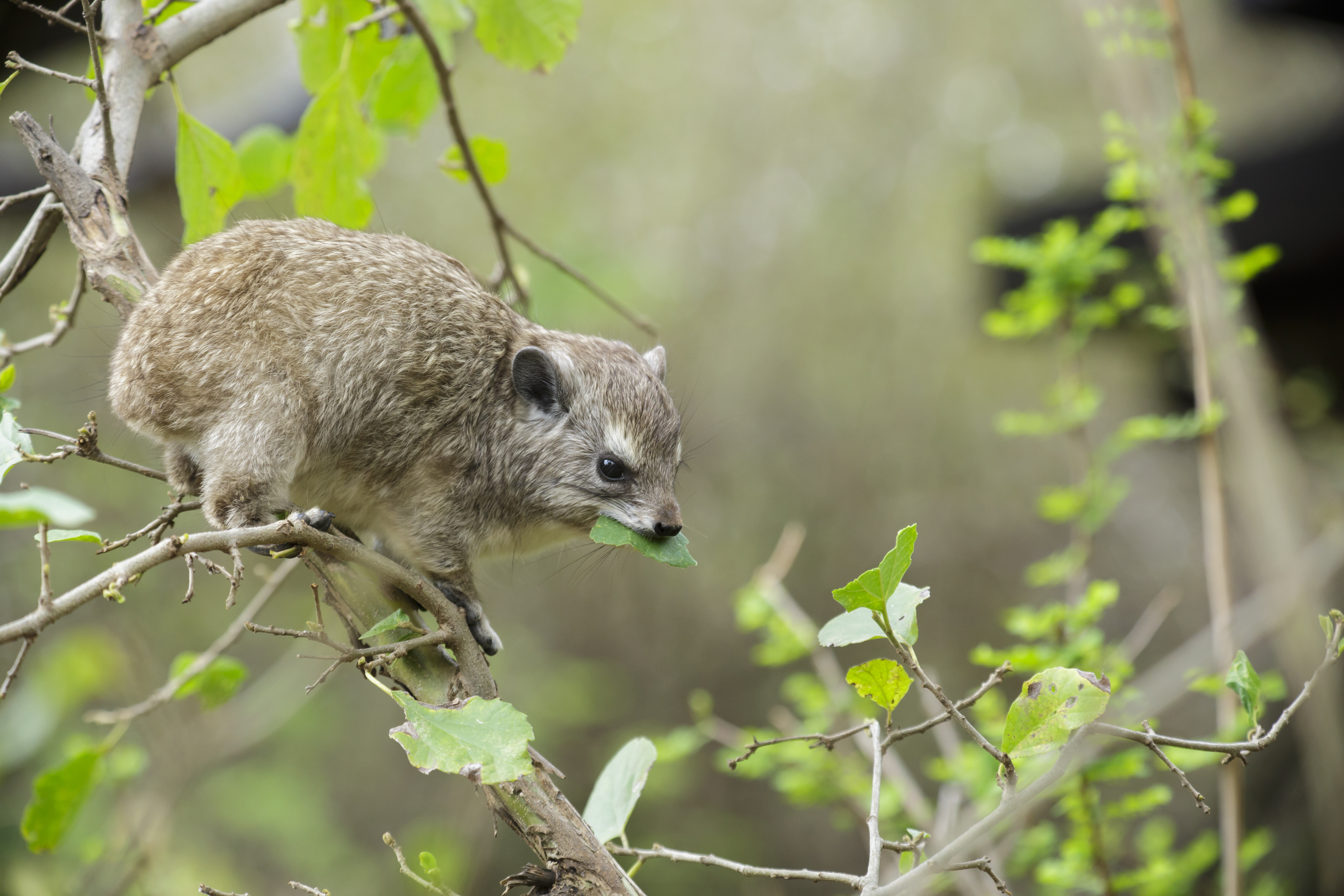
Bush hyrax feeding on leaves

The bush hyrax is a browser. They spend 80% of foraging time browsing on twigs, leaves, buds, flowers and forbs. Only rarely will they consume grass. One study reported that a colony of bush hyraxes in Zambia feeds on the leaves of bitter yams. Another study in Kenya reported that while they do not routinely feed on grasses they rely on grasses during wet seasons. It was reported that in the Serengeti National Park hyraxes feed in the morning and evening, eating more in the wet season in comparison to the dry season. Group feeding is common and occurs up to 50 m (160 ft) from the colony's shelter. However, casual feeding also occurs but at shorter distances from living space, up to 20 m, and consists of eating large amounts of food in an average of 20 minutes. Bush hyraxes have also been known to climb trees in order to obtain food.

Since their habitat is dry with scarce water, they obtain all the water they need from the vegetation they consume.

=== General behavior ===
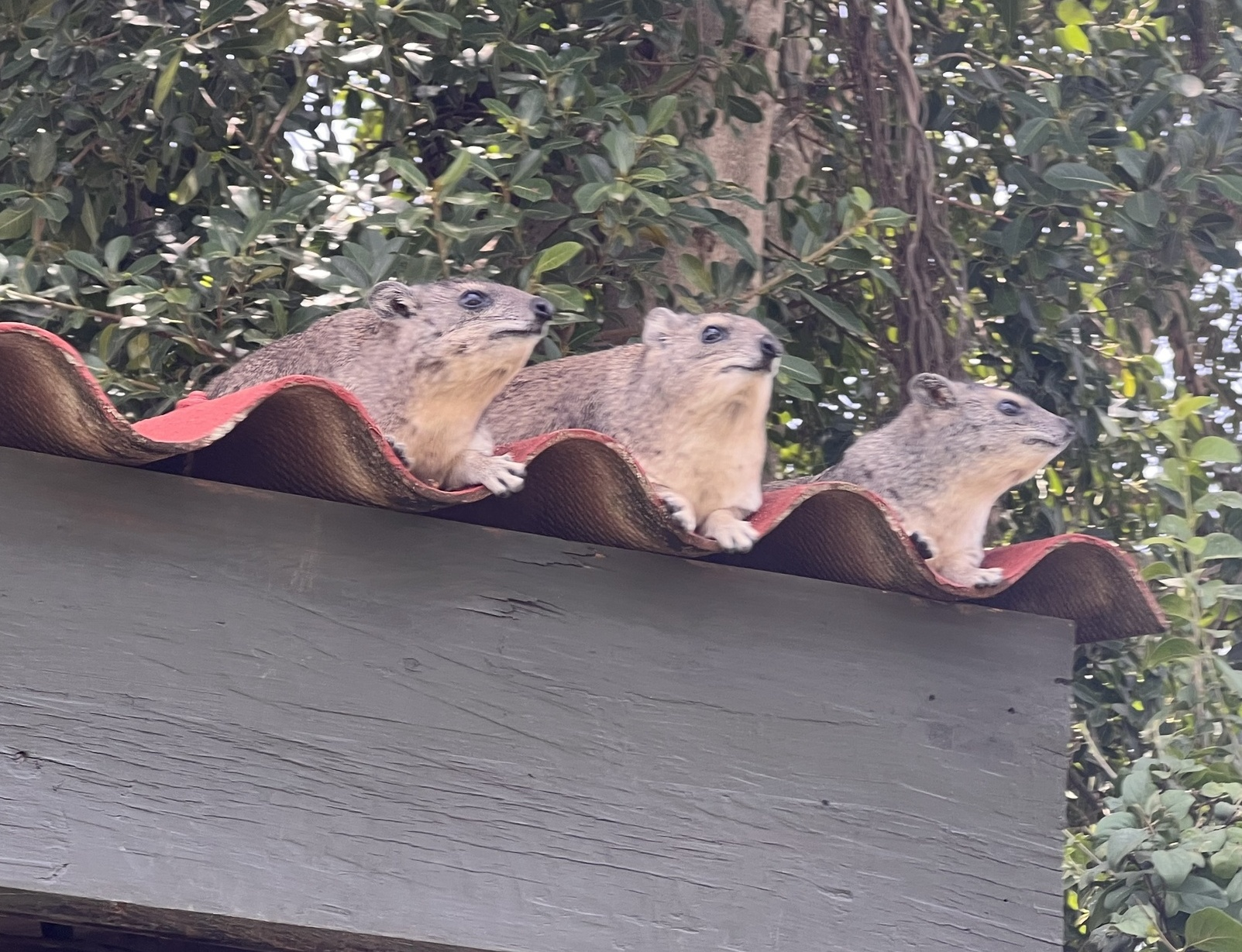
Trio in Tanzania

While they are diurnal, 95 percent of the day is spent resting, sun basking in the morning and evening, but avoiding the midday heat. While sun basking is necessary for thermoregulation, it greatly increases their risk of predation. However, they remain vigilant, and the dominant male will keep watch on a high rock and will give a shrill alarm if there is danger. Colonies of hyraxes include on average 34 individuals, but stable polygamous family groups make up the basic social unit. Hyraxes are highly social animals. Play behavior is generally limited to juveniles and includes fur nipping, biting, climbing, pushing, fighting, chasing, and mounting.

If they are attacked or threatened, they will bite aggressively. Their keen eyesight and good hearing enables them to be aware of approaching predators or potential threats.

Other documented behaviors include dust bathing to rid themselves of parasites. They also form latrines and habitually defecate and urinate in designated locations where they reside.

== In popular culture ==
In 2024, videos of bush hyraxes gained millions of views, particularly because of their unique vocalizations and calls.

== Parasitology ==
The bush hyrax is likely a reservoir for Leishmania aethiopica. One study captured 48 hyraxes from various colonies from three different locations in Ethiopia. Of these, three were infected with Leishmania aethiopia. However, there were no visible lesions and no amastigote stage parasites present, thus indicating that the bush hyrax is a reservoir and not a suitable host. The vector of Leishmania aethiopica is Phlebotomus longipes.
