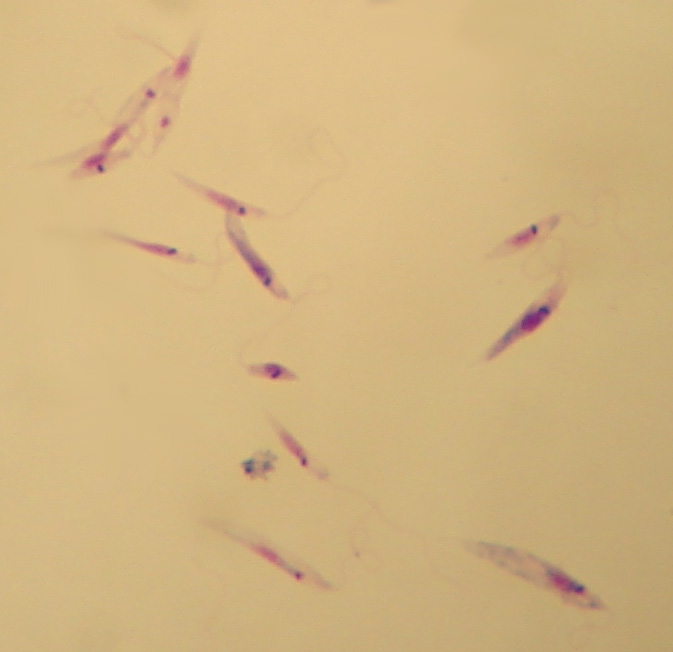
- Promastigotes of Leishmania tropica. Giemsa stain, 10×100.

Scientific classification
- Domain: Eukaryota
- Clade: Discoba
- Phylum: Euglenozoa
- Class: Kinetoplastea
- Order: Trypanosomatida
- Family: Trypanosomatidae
- Genus: Leishmania
- Species: L. tropica

Binomial name
- Leishmania tropica Wright, 1903
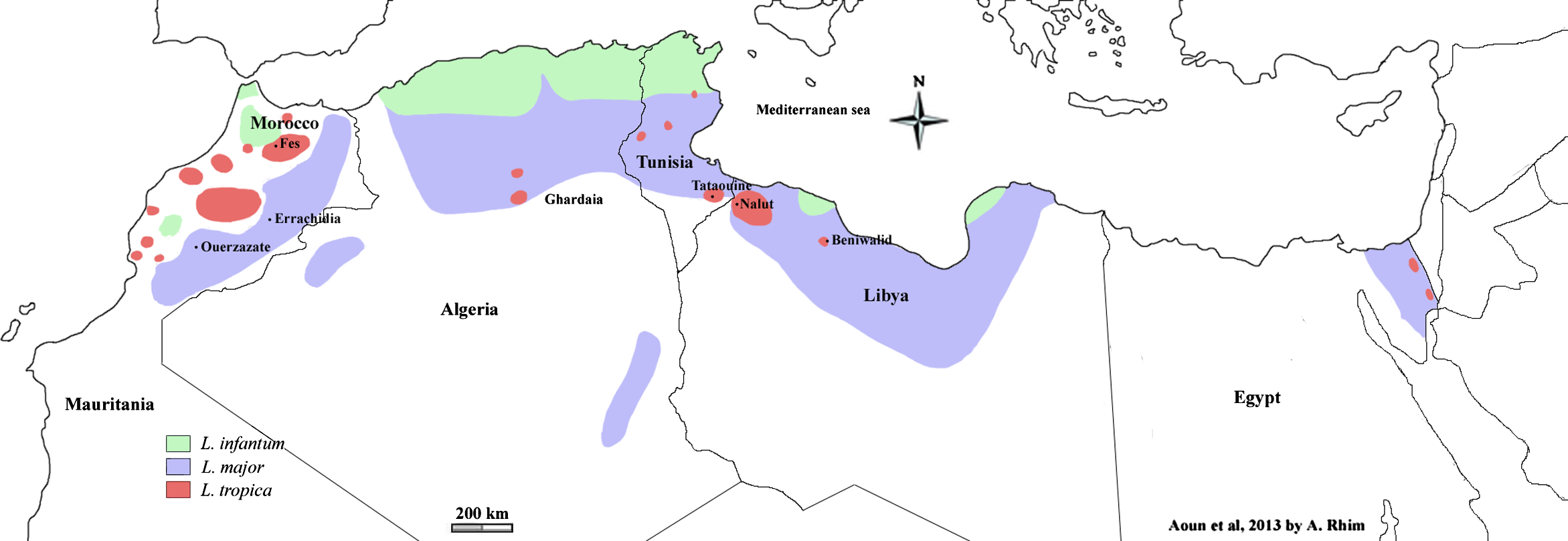
- Red = cutaneous L. tropica

= Leishmania tropica =

Species of protozoan parasite

Leishmania tropica is a flagellate parasite and the cause of anthroponotic cutaneous leishmaniasis in humans. This parasite is restricted to Afro-Eurasia and is a common cause of infection in Afghanistan, Iran, Syria, Yemen, Algeria, Morocco, and northern India.

== History ==
The first description of Leishmania tropica was done in 1903 by James Homer Wright, an American pathologist. In 1914, it was suggested that L. tropica should be divided into two subspecies, namely L. tropica minor and L. tropica major, based on the size of the parasites found in skin lesions. Later, these two subspecies turned out to be epidemiologically different and were correlated to different types of lesions. L. tropica minor causes dry nodular lesions in urban environments, while L. tropica major causes wet ulcerating lesions in rural regions. Bray et al. therefore proposed in 1973 that the subspecies should be considered as two separate species, L. tropica major became L. major, and L. tropica minor became L. tropica, which is the naming that is still being used.

== Biology ==
The parasite has an interesting biology since it is very heterogeneous biochemically, serologically, and genetically compared to other Leishmania species. The different strains have been shown to cause different patterns of pathogenicity and humoral immune responses in BALB/c mice models. Fusion and hybridization of different L. tropica strains can be efficiently induced in vitro by exposure of promastigotes (a stage of the life cycle) to DNA damage stress.

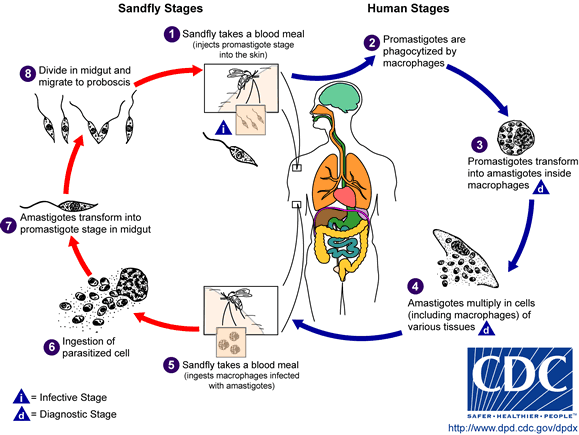
Life cycle

=== Life cycle ===
Leishmania species alternate between two main life forms: intracellular amastigotes in the sandfly – the vector – and extracellular motile promastigotes in the mammal – the host. In the mammalian host, promastigotes are introduced into the skin by the bite of a sandfly. After being taken up by phagocytes, they transform into intracellular amastigotes and stay in this form during the remaining life cycle in the mammalian host. Through simple division, they can multiply and proceed to infect other phagocytotic cells. Later, depending partly on the immunity of the host, the infection can become symptomatic and result in leishmaniasis. Sand flies become infected by ingesting phagocytes with Leishmania from a mammalian host. Then, in the sandfly stage, the process differs between Leishmania species. In the life cycle of L. tropica, it develops back into the promastigote stage inside the midgut of the sandfly vector and migrates to the proboscis of the sandfly, whereafter the life cycle can repeat itself.

== Hosts and vectors ==
Humans are the main reservoir hosts of L. tropica. Rock hyraxes (Procavia capensis) are a possible reservoir in Israel. Natural infection by L. tropica has also been demonstrated in domestic dogs, red foxes, golden jackals, gundis, and other species of wild rodents. The main sandfly vector for L. tropica is Phlebotomus sergenti. Other reported vector species are P. arabicus, P. guggisbergi, P. chabaudi, P. rossi, and P. saevus.

== Clinical manifestations ==
L. tropica causes a broad spectrum of leishmaniasis forms in humans. Most common is a variant called dry-type cutaneous leishmaniasis. After an incubation period lasting more than 2 months, a small brownish nodular lesion will appear with a slowly extending plaque reaching a size of 1–2 centimetres (0.39–0.79 in) after 6 months. This will heal after about 1 year but leaves a scar. Other forms of the disease, which occur more rarely in humans, include visceral leishmaniasis, post-kala-azar dermal leishmaniasis (a variant of visceral leishmaniasis), viscerotropic leishmaniasis, and leishmaniasis recidivans (a variant of cutaneous leishmaniasis).

Dogs are known to rarely suffer from visceral, skin, and mucosal infection with this species. In cats asymptomatic infection is thought to be common. Skin and/or mucosal infection is the most common form, with or without visceral infection. Feline visceral infection may occur alone.

=== Leishmaniasis recidivans ===
This rare variant of cutaneous leishmaniasis is caused solely by L. tropica in the Old World and by L. braziliensis in the New World. It causes a slowly progressing lesion, usually on the face, and is characterized by the development of papules or nodules which form mostly around or in the site of primary healed lesions. Lesions of leishmaniasis recidivans stay many years and rarely respond to treatment, thus causing disfigurement and becoming destructive with the years.
