= Endotrypanum schaudinni =

Scientific classification
- Domain: Eukaryota
- (unranked): incertae sedis
- Clade: Discoba
- Phylum: Euglenozoa
- Class: Kinetoplastea
- Order: Trypanosomatida
- Family: Trypanosomatidae
- Genus: Endotrypanum
- Species: E. schaudinni

Binomial name
- Endotrypanum schaudinni Mesnil & Brimont, 1908

Parasite found only in Hoffmann's two-toed sloth

Endotrypanum schaudinni is a parasite found only in Hoffmann's two-toed sloth (Choloepus hoffmanni). This sloth is found throughout South America in forested areas and this parasite is found throughout the population. Hoffman’s two-toed sloth is the only host species so it is of little economic or medical importance in humans. Endotrypanum schaudinni is transferred by an intermediate host of sandflies from the genus Lutzomyia. The highest concentration of flagellates in these insects is found in the pylorus region of this vector which may be important to transmission to the host. E. schaudinni is an intracellular parasite which invades the red blood cells of its definitive host. Little research has been done on the mechanism of action of this or the benefit of residing in the red blood cells but antigenic masking seems a possible reason. E. schaudinni is a hemoflagellate with a size of about 13.5 μm in length and 3.5 μm in diameter. Another point of interest is that E. schaudinni shares many of the same gene sequences as Leishmania, and two unique gene sequences were found in 2009 for diagnostic purposes. This diagnostic technique is an important factor in further studies of this parasite as identifying it but classical biochemical and ultrastructural parameters is unreliable.
