= Lipophosphoglycan =

Eukaryotic cell surface macromolecule

Lipophosphoglycan (LPG) is a class of molecules found on the surface of some eukaryotes, in particular protozoa. Each is made up of two parts, lipid and polysaccharide (also called glycan). They are bonded by a phosphodiester, hence the name lipo-phospho-glycan.

One species with extensive lipophosphoglycan coating is Leishmania, a group of single-celled protozoan parasite which cause leishmaniasis in many mammals, including humans. Their coats help modulate their hosts' immunological responses. LPG-like substances are released into medium by the parasite and are called excreted factor in aggregate.
