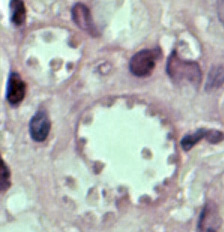
- Leishmania mexicana in a biopsy specimen from a skin lesion stained with H&E. The amastigotes are lining the walls of two vacuoles, a typical arrangement. The species identification was derived from culture followed by isoenzyme analysis.

Scientific classification
- Domain: Eukaryota
- Clade: Discoba
- Phylum: Euglenozoa
- Class: Kinetoplastea
- Order: Trypanosomatida
- Family: Trypanosomatidae
- Genus: Leishmania
- Species: L. mexicana

Binomial name
- Leishmania mexicana Biagi, 1953, emend. Garnham, 1962

= Leishmania mexicana =

Species of parasitic protist

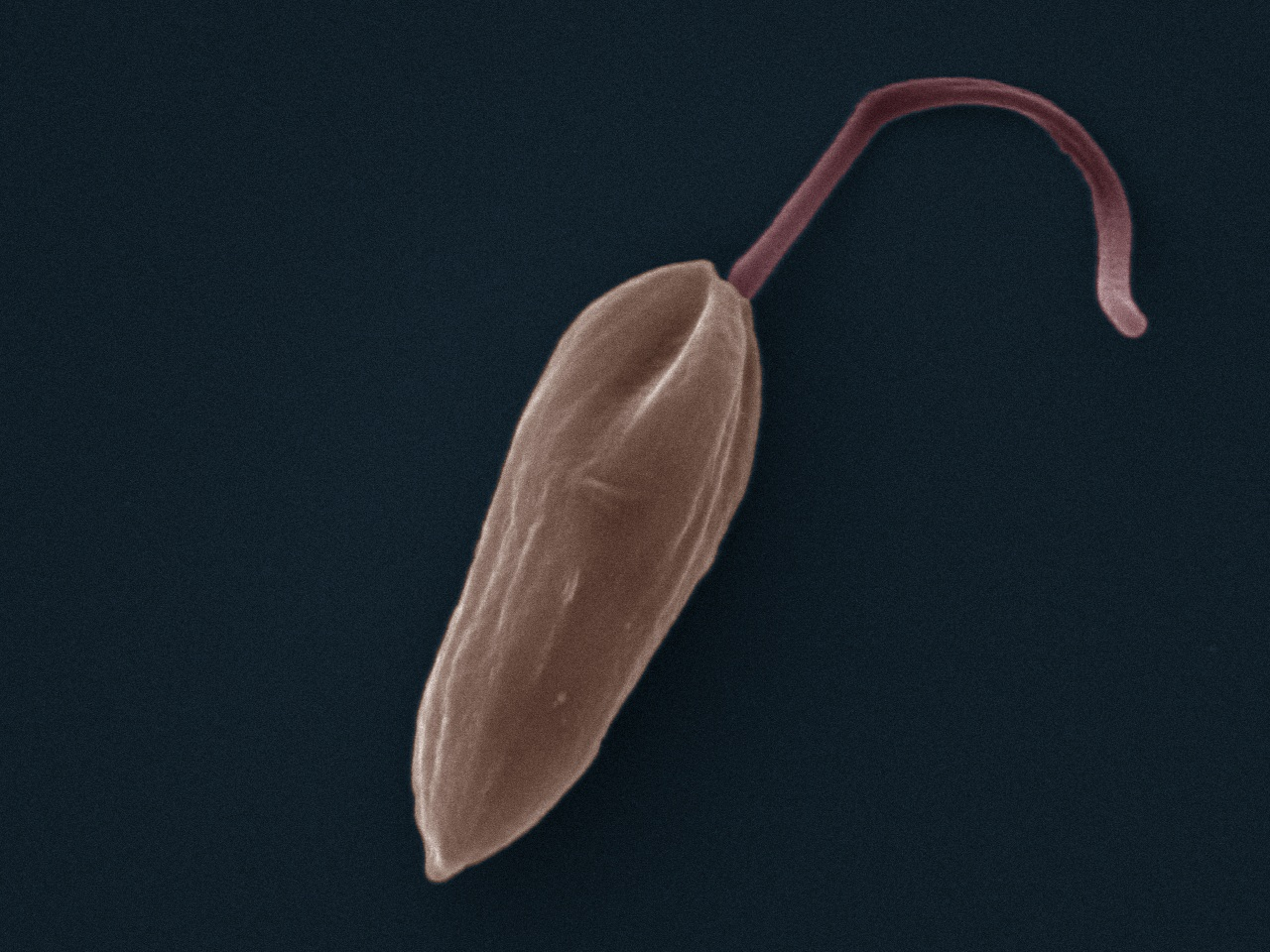
False colour SEM micrograph of Promastigote form Leishmania mexicana as found in the sandfly midgut. The cell body is shown in orange and the flagellum is in red. 119 pixels/μm.

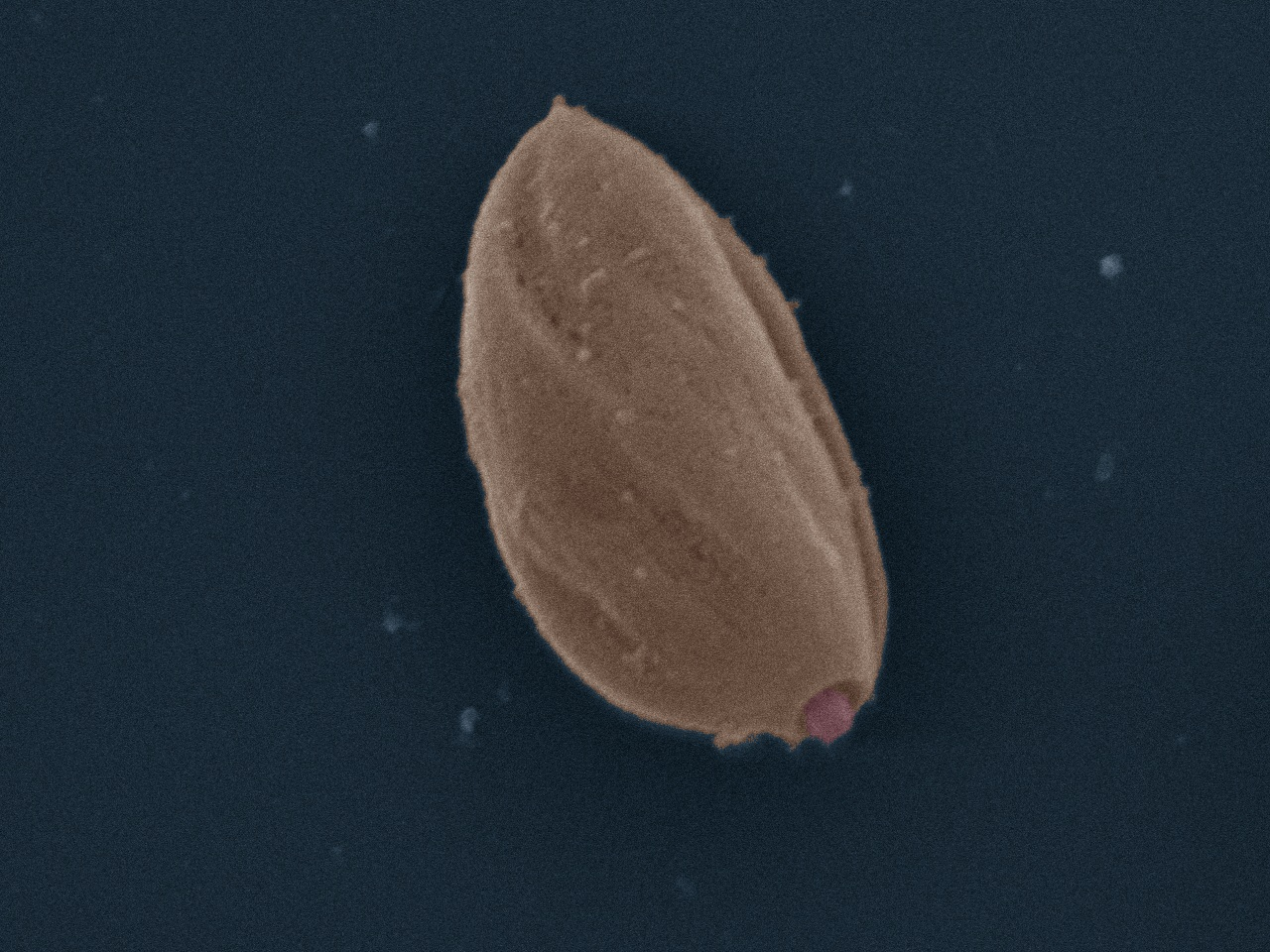
Amastigote form Leishmania mexicana as found in mammalian macrophages, 219 pixels/μm.

Leishmania mexicana is a species of obligate intracellular parasite of the protozoan genus Leishmania. In Mexico and Central America, this parasite is the primary cause of cutaneous leishmaniasis. It is also endemic to Texas, where 69 cases were identified between 2007-2019, at least 58% of which were acquired endemically. Climate change and pesticide resistance may allow L. mexicana to become endemic in Oklahoma in the 2020s, and it may have the potential to spread throughout the Southeast United States in the following decades.

Infected sandflies carry L. mexicana in its promastigote form, transmitting it from their salivary glands through their proboscis into the bloodstream of the host. When macrophages phagocytize the parasite, it transitions into its amastigote form, rapidly dividing to break the host cell open and infect other mononuclear phagocytic cells. When uninfected sandflies ingest the blood of an infected animal, they acquire L. mexicana, which returns to the promastigote form to efficiently survive in the insect's midgut.

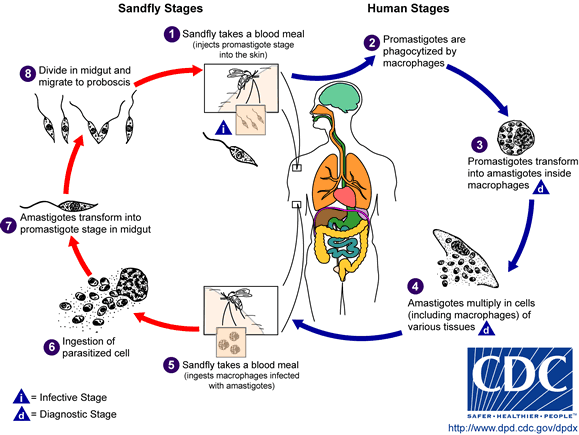

Leishmania mexicana can induce the cutaneous and diffuse cutaneous clinical manifestations in humans and certain other mammalian hosts. The cutaneous type develops an ulcer at the bite site, here the amastigotes do not spread and the ulcers become visible either a few days or several months after the initial bite. The diffuse cutaneous type begins when the amastigote diffuses through the skin and metastasize to other tissue. This type does not produce ulcers and there is no treatment.

Treatment of Leishmaniasis caused by L. mexicana consists of pentavalent antimonials as Pentostam or Glucantime injected direct into the ulcer or Intramuscular.

Prevention of L. mexicana infection is principally avoiding the bite of the infected sandfly.
