= Leishmania aethiopica =

Scientific classification
- Domain: Eukaryota
- Clade: Discoba
- Phylum: Euglenozoa
- Class: Kinetoplastea
- Order: Trypanosomatida
- Family: Trypanosomatidae
- Genus: Leishmania
- Species: L. aethiopica

Binomial name
- Leishmania aethiopica Bray, Ashford and Bray, 1973

Species of parasitic protist

Leishmania aethiopica is a Leishmania species.

It is associated with cutaneous leishmaniasis also called "oriental sore". It comes under the Old World group of Leishmania species, along with L. major and L. tropica which are other agents causing oriental sore.
