= Viscerotropic leishmaniasis =

- Specialty: Infectious diseases

Viscerotropic leishmaniasis is a systemic infection reported in soldiers fighting in Operation Desert Storm in Saudi Arabia.

== See also ==
- Leishmaniasis
- Skin lesion
