= Leishmania amazonensis =

Species of protozoan parasite

Leishmani amazonensis is classified between two groups, Old world and New World. The Old world species are found in Africa, Asia, Mediterranean region, and Middle East. The New World is located in the Americas these ecological niches are essential for its survival and reproduction.

== Epidemiology and Public Health ==
Leishmani amazonensis is a major public health concern, with over one billion people at risk in these regions and almost 1 million new cases every year. In Brazil L. amazomensis is considered neglected tropical disease that mainly affects people in rural areas, especially those with limited access to health care, lower income, and poor sanitation

=== Transmission and Life Style ===
The parasite is transmitted through the bite of an infected sandfly that belongs to the genus Lutzomyia in the New World . The life cycle has two forms, the first being the promastigote, which develops inside the vector, and the amastigote which resides within the phagolysosomes of rye host macrophages Animals are the primary host, humans serve as the second.

== Clinical Manifestations ==
Many Leishmani species cause localized lesions, Mucocutaneos Leishmaniasis (MCL) causes ulcers of the skin, mouth, and nose which can spread and become life threatening. Anergic Diffuse Cutaneous Leishmaniasis (ADCL) causes non ulcerative nodules and lesions covering large areas of the body, it is the most challenging form to treat

=== Treatment ===
For many years pentavalent antimony has been the first line of treatment and meglumine antimoniate being the second

Leishmania amazonensis

Scientific classification
- Domain: Eukaryota
- Supergroup: Discoba
- Phylum: Euglenozoa
- Class: Kinetoplastea
- Order: Trypanosomatida
- Family: Trypanosomatidae
- Genus: Leishmania
- Species: L. amazonensis

Binomial name
- Leishmania amazonensis Lainson & Shaw, 1972

Leishmania amazonensis is a parasite responsible for the disease leishmaniasis. This species has been known to spread by using sandflies as its vector and a vertebrate as its primary host, just like other species of Leishmania. They have also been known to spread throughout the Brazilian Amazon region due to their ecological niches needed for survival and reproduction. However, when the host is infected, the Leishmania can cause 3 different forms of Leishmaniasis. For this species, it has been known to cause cutaneous leishmaniasis and mucocutaneous leishmaniasis. Cutaneous leishmaniasis is commonly characterized with skin lesions, which can appear localized, or throughout the body. While mucocutaneous leishmaniasis is characterized with ulcers around the skin, mouth, and nose. This form of Leishmaniasis has also been known to can spread by metastasis and can be deadly.
