= Leishmania braziliensis =

Scientific classification
- Domain: Eukaryota
- Clade: Discoba
- Phylum: Euglenozoa
- Class: Kinetoplastea
- Order: Trypanosomatida
- Family: Trypanosomatidae
- Genus: Leishmania
- Species: L. braziliensis

Binomial name
- Leishmania braziliensis Vianna, 1911

Species of Kinetoplastea

Leishmania braziliensis is a Leishmania species found in South America. It is associated with leishmaniasis.

== Signs and symptoms ==
Within a few months of infection, an ulcer forms. After healing there is an asymptomatic phase for three to twenty years. At this time, the parasite causes oral and nasal lesions causing severe damage to the mucous membranes.

Visceral leishmaniasis causes the infected to have a fever, skin lesions, skin tumors, loss in weight, spleen and liver enlargement, and if left untreated, death.

== Treatment ==
Pentostam, liposomal and lipid complex preparations of amphotericin B, or paromomycin can be given.

In Brazil, currently, the most common treatment for humans to cure leishmaniasis is the drug meglumine antimoniate. About 80 percent of patients with cutaneous leishmaniasis respond successfully to the drug, but for disseminated leishmaniasis only 40 percent are successfully cured of the disease after one treatment, so in these cases the patients are treated for longer periods of standard therapy. Some patients undergo multiple treatments that last 60 days each time. When resistance is suspected an alternative treatment is miltefosine, some times associated with liposomal amphotericin.

== Sexual reproduction ==
Leishmania braziliensis, like other species of Leishmania, rely on asexual reproduction in the intermediate mammalian host to greatly increase population density. Such reproduction is often witnessed in mononuclear phagocytes (dendritic cells, monocytes, neutrophils) of the mammalian host, with the macrophages being the target white blood cell of the parasite. Recently, it has been hypothesized through two studies that certain members of the Leishmania genus (e.g. L. braziliensis) are capable of sexual reproduction in the gut of the sandfly vector. More work is needed to establish a clear pattern of sexual reproduction in the genus.

The reproduction of the Leishmania braziliensis vector, the sandfly, is dependent on environmental conditions. Environmental conditions such as high humidity, higher temperatures, deforestation add an increased risk because it causes increased reproduction of the parasite carrying sandflies. These environmental changes put more people at risk with the vector and cause a greater geographic distribution of the sandfly and, consequently, the infectious disease.

== Ceará, Brazil ==
=== Historical introduction into Brazil ===
Leishmania braziliensis is a species of Leishmania or leishmaniasis that has emerged in Northeast Brazil. It is an infectious disease that is spread by a parasite in sandflies that use domestic dogs as hosts. The emergence of leishmaniasis in Brazil, specifically the Northeast state of Ceará, is theorized to date back to the Great Drought of the 19th century Brazil.

The Grande Seca of 1877 to 1878 led to the mass migration of approximately 55 thousand Brazilians from Ceará to the Amazon for employment on rubber plantations. The disease is easily and mostly transmitted on plantations in which the people live and work.

Direct and primary evidence of leishmaniasis' existence is extremely minimal as the disease was not known to the Northeast and therefore was not identified and labeled until 1895 in Bahia. However, even though there was a lack of name-calling evidence, there are still reports of a disease that matches the descriptions of Leishmania braziliensis. In 1827, before the Great Drought, Rabello cites reports from missionaries in the Amazon region seeing people with skin lesions that fit the description of the disease. In 1909, the newly graduated medical student at the time of the drought, Studart, reported a skin condition that has the potential of being leishmaniasis. It is also possible that, in combination with a lack of general information and knowledge of the disease to the public plus the mass deaths and burials that occurred from 1877 to 1879, that people were dying of leishmaniasis without knowing the true cause of their death.

On December 10, 1879, Studart reported seeing more than a thousand people die in one day. It is very possible that a portion of those could have died because of leishmaniasis. An unknown disease is also mentioned by Herbert Huntington Smith, to which he attributes the death of 430 thousand people out of half a million who died, crediting the cause of death for the remaining 70 thousand to "various diseases". Because not many primary sources were preserved, as stated candidly by drought writer Joao Eudes da Costa, it is very difficult to find sources during this time that directly point to the presence of leishmaniasis during the Great Drought. Regardless, there is evidence of the disease before and after the drought, so it is highly likely that it was present and exacerbated during the Grande Seca.

After contracting and spreading the disease within the plantations, workers later left the Amazon and returned to the Northeast carrying the parasite and introducing the first cases of leishmaniasis to the state.

=== Contemporary ===
The environmental conditions and the socio-economic factors of the drought-stricken Ceará made the area perfect and the people vulnerable to the spread of leishmaniasis. The migrants and those that remained in Ceará were malnourished, immunocompromised, and suffered from poor or even lack of sanitation and housing. In addition to the fact that the state is a semiarid region, the condition of Ceará after the Grande Seca made it a breeding ground for leishmaniasis infections that resulted in the disease being cemented into the state.

Visceral leishmaniasis, which is the most common in the Northeast region of Brazil, causes the infected to have fever, skin lesions, skin tumors, loss in weight, spleen and liver enlargement, and if left untreated, death. Environmental conditions, socio-economic status, demographic and human behaviors are what pose major risks to humans as well as manmade risks like migration, deforestation, urbanization, climate change, and immunosuppression. Environmental conditions such as high humidity, higher temperatures, and deforestation add an increased risk because they cause increased reproduction and geographic distribution of the parasite-carrying sandflies and, consequently, of the infectious disease.

Leishmaniasis has made its appearance in 1981 to 1985 in Teresina; it reached epidemic levels in 1992 with a peak in 1994. These epidemics were preceded by long and severe droughts in the region. From 1986 to 2005, Ceará has had more than 49 thousand new cases of Leishmania braziliensis; this estimate is like an underestimate since it is difficult to report the number of cases in rural areas. Those suffering from the disease are living the same lifestyle and with the same vulnerabilities as the Brazilians with leishmaniasis directly after the Great Drought. The diseased in modern-day Ceará are commonly poor teenagers aged 15 to 19, working in agriculture, and are male.

Leishmania braziliensis is usually referred to as a rural problem since the increased risk factors are common in rural areas of Ceará. The people of the Northeast are still the most vulnerable. The drivers of the disease target those that live in crowded and underdeveloped housing near rubbish, sewage, and polluted water sources. Though the disease targets Ceará the hardest because of its conditions, migration has spread the disease to larger cities, as more droughts, famine, and lack of usable farmland have led to large migrations from rural areas to cities.

This massive influx of people creates a space for the disease to spread and infect easily. Leishmaniasis is found more commonly in favelas or "shanty towns" as the residents have increased risks and live in "overcrowded conditions with inadequate housing and sanitary facilities" (Arias, J R et al.). In addition, domestic stray dogs are the "principal animal reservoir" for the disease, which makes urban areas like the favelas at an even greater risk because strays are common in these areas.
