= Amastigote =

Type of protist cell

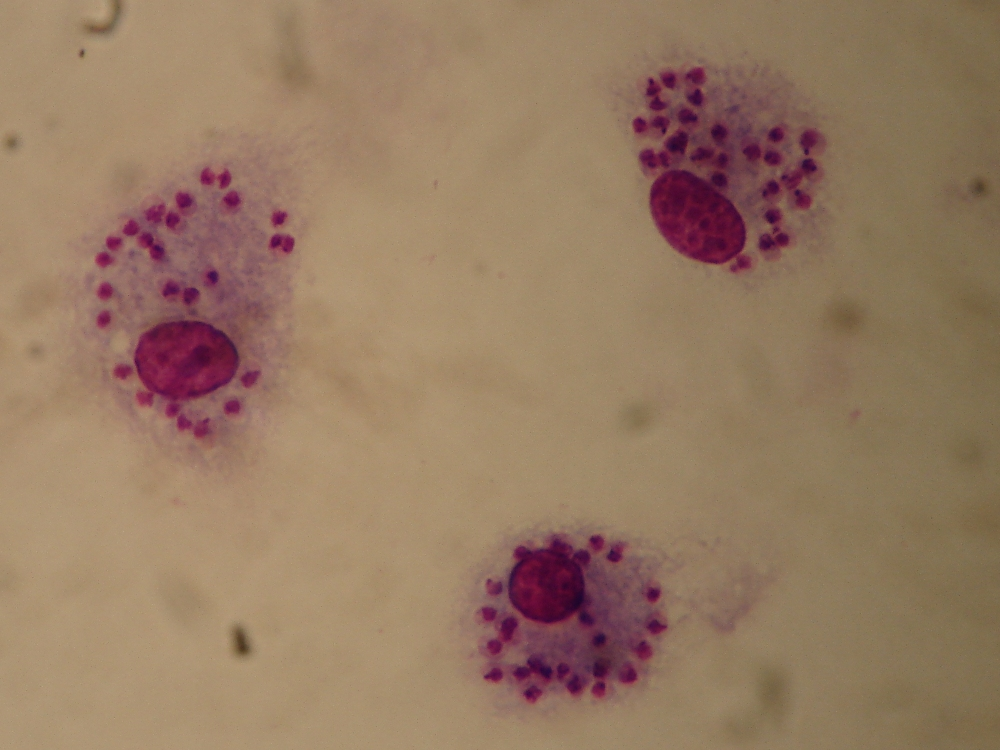
Amastigotes, shown as the smaller stained dots inside the cell.

An amastigote is a protist cell that does not have visible external flagella or cilia. The term is used mainly to describe an intracellular phase in the life-cycle of trypanosomes that replicates. It is also called the leishmanial stage, since in Leishmania it is the form the parasite takes in the vertebrate host, but occurs in all trypanosome genera.
