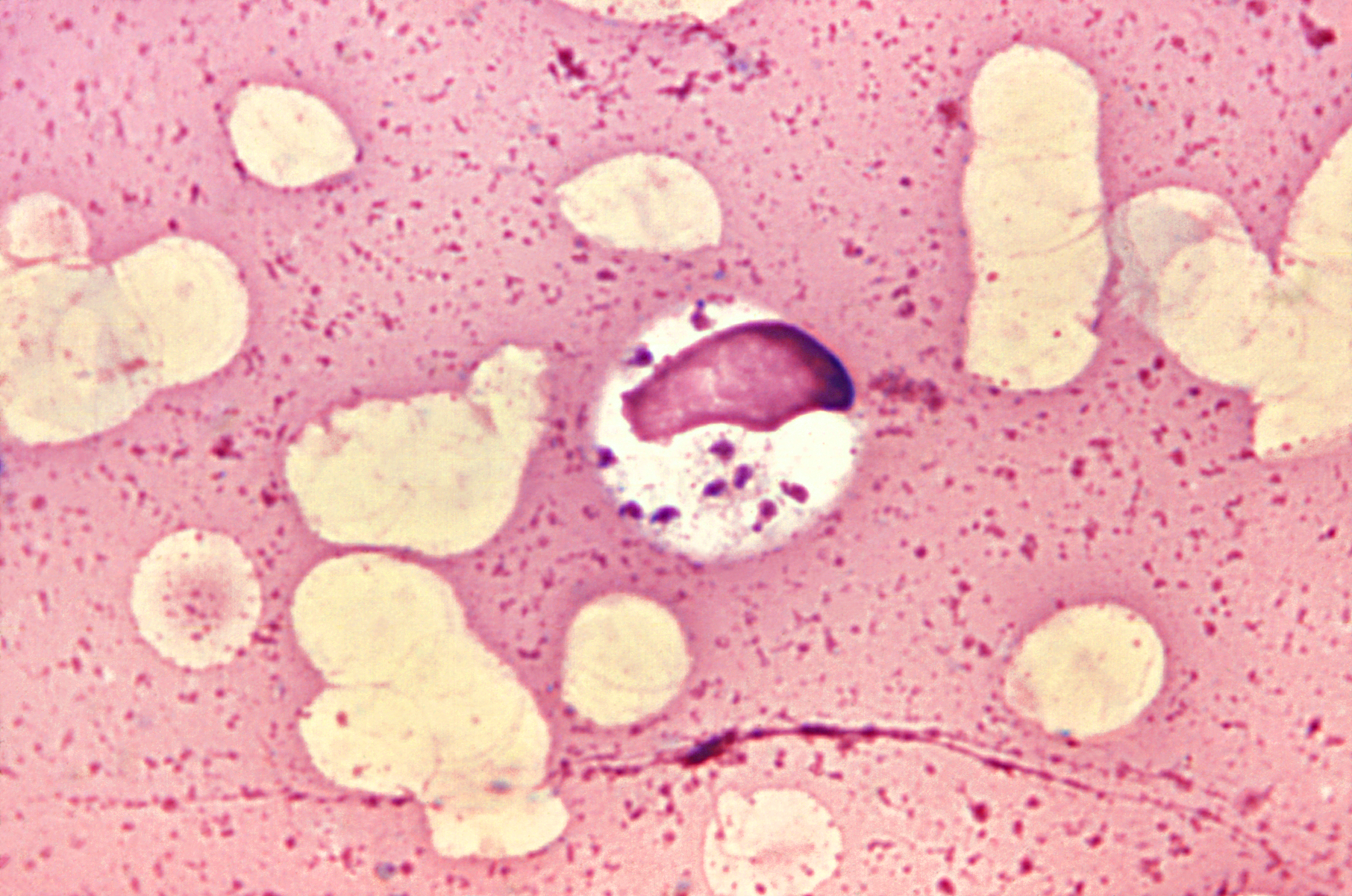
- L. donovani in bone marrow cell

Scientific classification
- Domain: Eukaryota
- Supergroup: Discoba
- Phylum: Euglenozoa
- Class: Kinetoplastea
- Order: Trypanosomatida
- Family: Trypanosomatidae
- Infrafamily: Leishmaniatae
- Genus: Leishmania; Ross, 1903

Species
- L. aethiopica L. amazonensis L. arabica L. archibaldi (starus species); L. aristedesi (status disputed); L. (Viannia) braziliensis L. chagasi (syn. L. infantum); L. donovani L. (Mundinia) enriettii L. forattinii (status disputed); L. garnhami (status disputed); L. gerbili L. (Viannia) guyanensis L. infantum L. killicki (status disputed); L. (Viannia) lainsoni L. major L. (Mundinia) macropodum L. (Mundinia) martiniquensis L. mexicana L. (Viannia) naiffi L. (Viannia) panamensis L. (Viannia) peruviana L. pifanoi (status disputed); L. (Viannia) shawi L. tarentolae L. tropica L. turanica L. waltoni L. venezuelensis

= Leishmania =

Genus of parasitic flagellate protist

Leishmania (/liːʃˈmeɪniə, -ˈmæn-/) is a genus of parasitic protozoans, single-celled eukaryotic organisms of the trypanosomatid group that are responsible for the disease leishmaniasis. The parasites are transmitted by sandflies of the genus Phlebotomus in the Old World, and of the genus Lutzomyia in the New World. Leishmania parasites are transmitted by around 100 species of sandflies. The primary hosts are vertebrates. They commonly infect hyraxes, canids, rodents, occasional intermediary hosts, and humans.

== History ==
Members of an ancient genus of Leishmania-like parasites, Paleoleishmania, have been detected in fossilized sand flies dating back to the early Cretaceous period. The first written reference to the conspicuous symptoms of cutaneous leishmaniasis surfaced in the Paleotropics within oriental texts dating back to the 7th century BC (allegedly transcribed from sources several hundred years older, between 1500 and 2000 BC). Due to its broad and persistent prevalence throughout antiquity as a mysterious disease of diverse symptomatic outcomes, leishmaniasis has been dubbed with various names ranging from "white leprosy" to "black fever". Some of these names suggest links to negative cultural beliefs or mythology, which still feed into the social stigmatization of leishmaniasis today.

In India, both cutaneous and visceral leishmaniasis are caused by Leishmania donovani. The first records of cutaneous leishmaniasis in India were from British medical officers in the early 19th century. The disease was by then known as "oriental sore" or "Delhi boil"; while the visceral form was variously called "Burdwan [after the city Burdwan] fever", "kala azar" (black fever), or "Dumdum [a city in West Bengal] fever".

The causative parasite for the disease was identified in 1901 as a concurrent finding by William Boog Leishman and Charles Donovan. They independently visualised microscopic single-celled parasites (later called Leishman–Donovan bodies) living within the cells of infected human organs. The parasitic genus would later be classed as trypanosomatid protozoans under the phylogenetic designation, Leishmania donovani. Several species have since been classified and grouped under two major subgenera i.e. Leishmania Viannia (generally located in the Neotropics) or Leishmania Leishmania (generally located in the Paleotropics, with the major exception of the L. mexicana subgroup).

== Epidemiology ==
Leishmania currently affects 6 million people in 98 countries. About 0.9–1.6 million new cases occur each year, and 21 species are known to cause disease in humans: it is considered a zoonosis.

== Structure ==
Leishmania species are unicellular eukaryotes having a well-defined nucleus and other cell organelles including kinetoplasts and flagella. Depending on the stage of their life cycle, they exist in two structural variants, as:

1. The amastigote form is found in the mononuclear phagocytes and circulatory systems of humans. It is an intracellular and nonmotile form, being devoid of external flagella. The short flagellum is embedded at the anterior end without projecting out. It is oval in shape, and measures 3–6 μm in length and 1–3 μm in breadth. The kinetoplast and basal body lie towards the anterior end.
2. The promastigote form is found in the alimentary tract of sandflies. It is an extracellular and motile form. It is considerably larger and highly elongated, measuring 15-30 μm in length and 5 μm in width. It is spindle-shaped, tapering at both ends. A long flagellum (about the body length) is projected externally at the anterior end. The nucleus lies at the centre, and in front of it are the kinetoplast and the basal body.

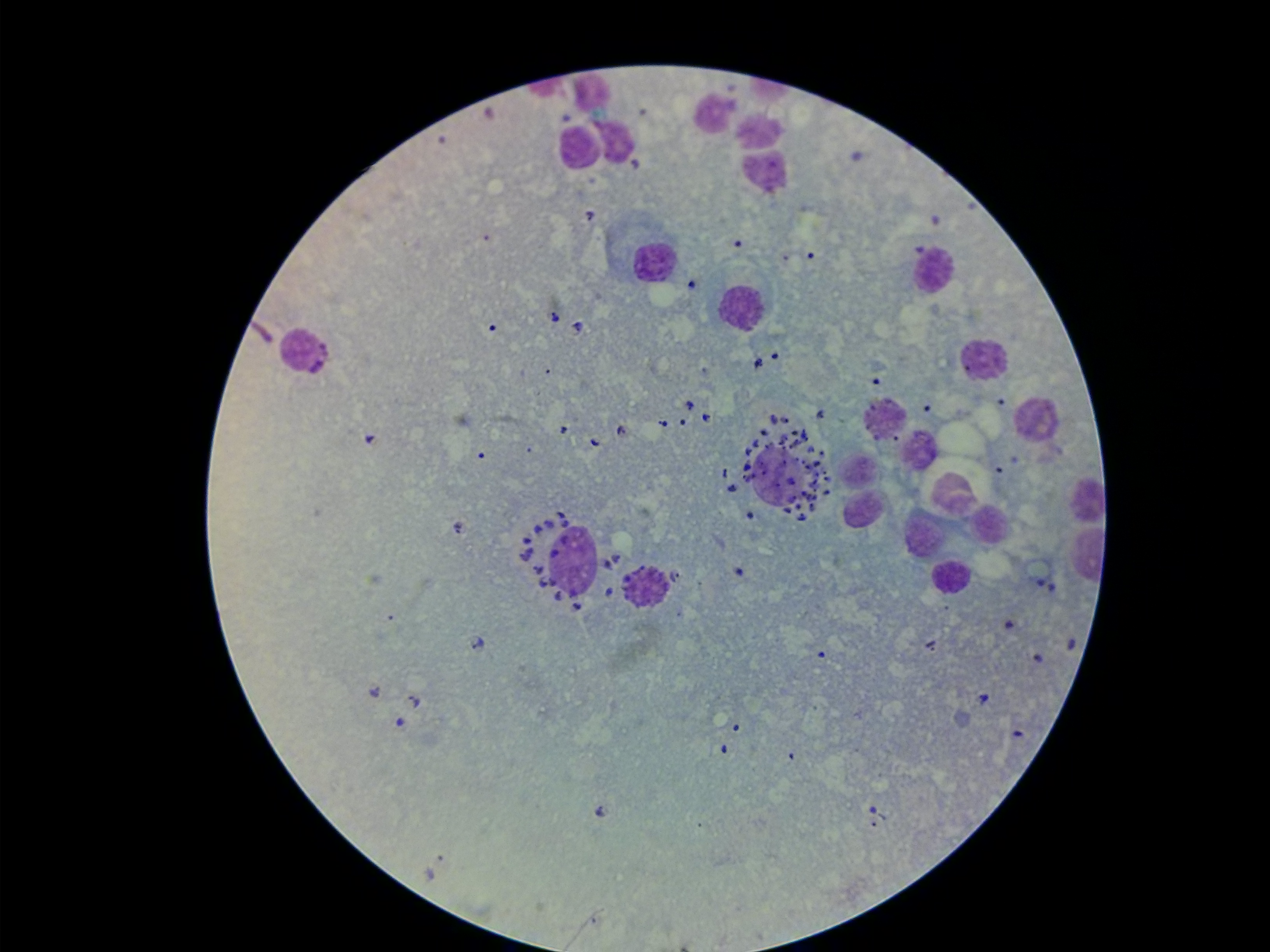
L. infantum amastigote forms

== Evolution ==
The details of the evolution of this genus are debated, but Leishmania apparently evolved from an ancestral trypanosome lineage. The oldest lineage is that of the Bodonidae, followed by Trypanosoma brucei, the latter being confined to the African continent. Trypanosoma cruzi groups with trypanosomes from bats, South American mammals, and kangaroos suggest an origin in the Southern Hemisphere. These clades are only distantly related.

The remaining clades in this tree are Blastocrithidia, Herpetomonas, and Phytomonas. The four genera Leptomonas, Crithidia, Leishmania, and Endotrypanum form the terminal branches, suggesting a relatively recent origin. Several of these genera may be polyphyletic and may need further division.

The origins of genus Leishmania itself are unclear. One theory proposes an African origin, with migration to the Americas. Another proposes migration from the Americas to the Old World via the Bering Strait land bridge around 15 million years ago. A third theory proposes a Palearctic origin. Such migrations would entail subsequent migration of vector and reservoir or successive adaptations along the way. A more recent migration is that of L. infantum from Mediterranean countries to Latin America (known as L. chagasi), since European colonization of the New World, where the parasites picked up their current New World vectors in their respective ecosystems. This is the cause of the epidemics now evident. One recent New World epidemic concerns foxhounds in the USA.

Although it was suggested that Leishmania might have evolved in the Neotropics, this is probably true for species belonging to the subgenera Viannia and Endotrypanum. However, there is evidence that the primary evolution of the subgenera Leishmania and Sauroleishmania is the Old World. While the Mundinia species appear to be more universal in their evolution. One theory is that different lineages became isolated geographically during different periods and it is this that gave rise to this evolutionary mosaicism. But there is no doubt that the Leishmaniinae are a monophyletic group.

A large data set analysis suggests that Leishmania evolved 90 to 100 million years ago in Gondwana. The reptile infecting species originated in mammalian clades.

Sauroleishmania species were originally defined on the basis that they infected reptiles (lizards) rather than mammals. Based on molecular evidences, they have been moved to subgenus status within Leishmania. This subgenus probably evolved from a group that originally infected mammals.

== Taxonomy ==
53 species are recognised in this genus. The status of several of these is disputed, so the final number may differ. At least 20 species infect humans. To make things more complex, hybrids might be involved, as it has been reported in Brazil with a hybrid between Leishmania (V.) guyanensis and Leishmania (V.) shawi shawi.

The genus is presently divided into 4 subgenera: Leishmania, Sauroleishmania, Mundinia and Viannia. The division into the two subgenera (Leishmania and Viannia) was made by Lainson and Shaw in 1987 on the basis of their location within the insect gut. The species in the Viannia subgenus develop in the hind gut: L. (V.) braziliensis has been proposed as the type species for this subgenus. This division has been confirmed by all subsequent studies. Shaw, Camargo and Teixeira created the subgenus Mundinia while revising Leishmaniinae in 2016.

Endotrypanum is closely related to Leishmania. Some Endotypanum species are unique in that they infect the erythrocytes of their hosts (sloths). All species are confined to Central and South America. E. colombiensis infections have been found in man.

Sauroleishmania was originally described by Ranquein 1973 as a separate genus, but molecular studies suggest this is actually a subgenus rather than a separate genus.

The proposed division of the Leishmania into Euleishmania and Paraleishmania groups in 2000 emphasized the deep phylogenic distance between parasites, some of which had been named as Leishmania species. The Euleishmania included species currently placed in the subgenera Leishmania, Sauroleishmania, Mundinia and Viannia. The proposed Paraleishmania included species of Endotypanum, Leishmamnia-L. colomubensis, L. herreri, L. hertigiand L. deanei and L. equatorensis. In a recent revision these species were given different generic status.

Four subgenera of Leishmania are now recognised - Leishmania, Sauroleishmania, Viannia and Mundinia (the L. enriettii complex). The genus Endotrypanum and Porcisia belong to the Paraleishmania.

There are four Mundinia species - L. (Mundinia) enriettii, L. (Mundinia) martiniquensis, L. (Mundinia) macropodum, and L. (Mundinia) orientalis, which is found in Thailand.

L. archibaldi's specific status is unsettled but it is closely related to L. donovani.

L. herreri belongs to the genus Endotypanum rather than to Leishmania.

L. donovani and L. infantum are closely related.

=== Notes ===
The selenoenzyme Seltryp appears to be unique to this order. It has been removed from the subgenus Viannia.

L. deanei and L. hertigi, both of which infect porcupines have been moved to the genus Porcisia.

== Classification ==
Subgenus Leishmania Ross, 1903 sensu Saf'janova, 1982

- Leishmania aethiopica Bray, Ashford & Bray, 1973
- Leishmania amazonensis Lainson & Shaw, 1972 (includes garnhami Scorza et al., 1979)
- Leishmania arabica Peters, Elbihari & Evans, 1986
- Leishmania aristidesi Lainson & Shaw, 1979
- Leishmania donovani (Laveran & Mesnil, 1903)
- Leishmania forattinii Yoshida, Cuba, Pacheco, Cupolillo, Tavares, Machado, Homen & Grimaldi, 1993
- Leishmania gerbilli Wang, Qu & Guan, 1964
- Leishmania infantum Nicolle, 1908 (subspecies chagasi Cunha & Chagas, 1937)
- Leishmania killicki Rioux, Lamotte & Pratlong, 1986
- Leishmania major Yakimoff & Schokhor, 1914
- Leishmania mexicana Biagi, 1953
- Leishmania pifanoi Medina & Romero, 1959
- Leishmania tropica (Wright, 1903)
- Leishmania turanica Strelkova, Shurkhal, Kellina, Eliseev, Evans, Peters, Chapman, Le Blancq & van Eys, 1990
- Leishmania venezeulensis Bonfante-Garrido, 1980
- Leishmania waltoni Shaw, Pratlong & Dedet 2015

Subgenus Mundinia Shaw, Camargo and Teixeira 2016

- Leishmania enriettii Muniz & Medina, 1948
- Leishmania macropodum Barratt, Kaufer, Peters, Craig, Lawrence, Roberts, Lee, McAuliffe, Stark, Ellis, 2017
- Leishmania martiniquensis Desbois, Pratlong, Quist and Dedet,2014
- Leishmania orientalis Jariyapan, Daroontum, Jaiwong, Chanmol,.Intakhan, Sor-Suwan, Siriyasatien, Somboon, Bates, Bates, 2018

Subgenus Sauroleishmania Ranque, 1973 sensu Saf'janova, 1982

- Leishmania adleri Heisch, 1958
- Leishmania agamae David, 1929
- Leishmania ceramodactyli Adler & Theodor, 1929
- Leishmania gulikae Ovezmukhammedov & Saf'janova, 1987
- Leishmania gymnodactyli † Khodukin & Sofiev, 1940
- Leishmania helioscopi † Chodukin & Sofiev, 1940
- Leishmania hemidactyli Mackie, Gupta & Swaminath, 1923
- Leishmania hoogstraali McMillan, 1965
- Leishmania nicollei Chodukin & Sofieff, 1940
- Leishmania platycephala Telford, 2009
- Leishmania phrynocephali Chodukin & Sofieff, 1940
- Leishmania senegalensis Ranque, 1973
- Leishmania sofieffi ↑ Markov, Lukina & Markova, 1964
- Leishmania tarentolae Wenyon, 1921
- Leishmania zmeevi ↑ Andruchko & Markov 1955
- Leishmania zuckermani Paperna, Boulard, Hering-Hagenbeck & Landau, 2001

↑ Species described as Sauroleishmania. Their development is not like other members of the subgenus and so their taxonomic position is doubtful.

Subgenus Viannia Lainson & Shaw 1987

- Leishmania braziliensis Vianna, 1911
- Leishmania guyanensis Floch, 1954
- Leishmania lainsoni Silveira, Shaw, Braga & Ishikawa, 1987
- Leishmania lindenbergi Silveira, Ishikawa, De Souza & Lainson, 2002
- Leishmania naiffi Lainson & Shaw, 1989
- Leishmania panamensis Lainson & Shaw, 1972
- Leishmania peruviana Velez, 1913
- Leishmania shawi Lainson, Braga & de Souza, 1989
- Leishmania utingensis Braga, Lainson, Ishikawa & Shaw 2003

=== Related genera ===
The relationships between Leishmania and other genera such as Endotrypanum, Novymonas, Porcisia, and Zelonia is presently unclear as they are closely related. Endotrypanum colombiensis, formerly known as Leishmania colombiensis, has been associated with both cutaneous and visceral leishmaniasis in Venezuela.

Genus Endotrypanum

- Endotrypanum colombiensis Kreutzer, Corredor, Grimaldi, Grogl, Rowton, Young, Morales, McMahon-Pratt, Guzman & Tesh, 1991
- Endotrypanum equatorensis Grimaldi, Kreutzer, Hashiguchi, Gomet, Mimory & Tesh, 1992
- Endotrypanum herreri Zeledon, Ponce & Murillo, 1979
- Endotrypanum monterogeii Shaw, 1969
- Endotrypanum schaudinni Mesnil and Brimont, 1908

Genus Novymonas Kostygov and Yurchenko 2016

- Novymonas esmeraldas Votýpka, Kostygov, Maslov and Lukeš, 2016

Genus Porcisia Shaw, Camargo and Teixeira, 2016

- Porcisia deanei Lainson & Shaw, 1977
- Porcisia hertigi Herrer, 1971

Genus Zelonia Shaw, Camargo and Teixeira, 2016

- Zelonia australiensis Barratt, Kaufer, Peters, Craig, Lawrence, Roberts, Lee, McAuliffe, Stark, Ellis, 2017
- Zelonia costaricensis Yurchenko, Lukes, Jirku, Zeledon, Maslov, 2006

== Biochemistry and cell biology ==
The biochemistry and cell biology of Leishmania is similar to that of other kinetoplastids. They share the same main morphological features: a single flagellum which has an invagination - the flagellar pocket - at its base; a kinetoplast, which is found in the single mitochondrion; and a subpellicular array of microtubules, which make up the main part of the cytoskeleton.

=== Lipophosphoglycan coat ===
Leishmania possesses a lipophosphoglycan coat over the outside of the cell. Lipophosphoglycan is a trigger for toll-like receptor 2, a signalling receptor involved in triggering an innate immune response in mammals.

The precise structure of lipophosphoglycan varies depending on the species and lifecycle stage of the parasite. The glycan component is particularly variable and different lipophosphoglycan variants can be used as a molecular marker for different lifecycle stages. Lectins, a group of proteins which bind different glycans, are often used to detect these lipophosphoglycan variants. For example, peanut agglutinin binds a particular lipophosphoglycan found on the surface of the infective form of L. major.

Lipophosphoglycan is used by the parasite to promote its survival in the host and the mechanisms by which the parasite does this center around modulating the immune response of the host. This is vital, as the Leishmania parasites live within macrophages and need to prevent the macrophages from killing them. Lipophosphoglycan has a role in resisting the complement system, inhibiting the oxidative burst response, inducing an inflammation response and preventing natural killer T cells recognising that the macrophage is infected with the Leishmania parasite.

Type	Pathogen	Location
Cutaneous leishmaniasis (localised and diffuse) infections appear as obvious skin reactions.	The most common is the Oriental Sore (caused by Old World species L. major, L. tropica, and L. aethiopica). In the New World, the most common culprits is L. mexicana.	Cutaneous infections are most common in Afghanistan, Brazil, Iran, Peru, Saudi Arabia and Syria.
Mucocutaneous leishmaniasis infections start off as a reaction at the bite, and can go by metastasis into the mucous membrane and become fatal.	L. braziliensis	Mucocutaneous infections are most common in Bolivia, Brazil and Peru. Mucocutaneous infections are also found in Karamay, China Xinjiang Uygur Autonomous Region.
Visceral leishmaniasis infections are often recognised by fever, swelling of the liver and spleen, and anemia. They are known by many local names, of which the most common is probably kala azar,	Caused exclusively by species of the L. donovani complex (L. donovani, L. infantum syn. L. chagasi).	Found in tropical and subtropical areas of all continents except Australia, visceral infections are most common in Bangladesh, Brazil, India, Nepal, and Sudan. Visceral leishmaniasis also found in part of China, such as Sichuan Province, Gansu Province, and Xinjiang Uygur Autonomous Region.

=== Intracellular mechanism of infection ===
In order to avoid destruction by the immune system and thrive, the Leishmania 'hides' inside its host's cells. This location enables it to avoid the action of the humoral immune response (because the pathogen is safely inside a cell and outside the open bloodstream), and furthermore it may prevent the immune system from destroying its host through nondanger surface signals which discourage apoptosis. The primary cell types Leishmania infiltrates are phagocytotic cells such as neutrophils and macrophages.

Usually, a phagocytotic immune cell like a macrophage will ingest a pathogen within an enclosed endosome and then fill this endosome with enzymes which digest the pathogen. However, in the case of Leishmania, these enzymes have no effect, allowing the parasite to multiply rapidly. This uninhibited growth of parasites eventually overwhelms the host macrophage or other immune cell, causing it to die.

Transmitted by the sandfly, the protozoan parasites of L. major may switch the strategy of the first immune defense from eating/inflammation/killing to eating/no inflammation/no killing of their host phagocyte and corrupt it for their own benefit. They use the willingly phagocytosing polymorphonuclear neutrophil granulocytes (PMNs) rigorously as a tricky hideout, where they proliferate unrecognized from the immune system and enter the long-lived macrophages to establish a "hidden" infection.

=== Uptake and survival ===
Lifecycle of Leishmania

Upon microbial infection, PMNs move out from the bloodstream through the vessels' endothelial layer, to the site of the infected tissue (dermal tissue after fly bite). They immediately initiate the first immune response and phagocytize the invader by recognition of foreign and activating surfaces on the parasite. Activated PMN secrete chemokines, IL-8 particularly, to attract further granulocytes and stimulate phagocytosis. Further, L. major increases the secretion of IL-8 by PMNs. This mechanism is observed during infection with other obligate intracellular parasites, as well. For microbes like these, multiple intracellular survival mechanisms exist. Surprisingly, the coinjection of apoptotic and viable pathogens causes by far a more fulminate course of disease than injection of only viable parasites. When the anti-inflammatory signal phosphatidylserine usually found on apoptotic cells, is exposed on the surface of dead parasites, L. major switches off the oxidative burst, thereby preventing killing and degradation of the viable pathogen.

In the case of Leishmania, progeny are not generated in PMNs, but in this way they can survive and persist untangled in the primary site of infection. The promastigote forms also release Leishmania chemotactic factor (LCF) to actively recruit neutrophils, but not other leukocytes, for instance monocytes or NK cells. In addition to that, the production of interferon gamma (IFNγ)-inducible protein 10 (IP10) by PMNs is blocked in attendance of Leishmania, what involves the shut down of inflammatory and protective immune response by NK and Th1 cell recruitment. The pathogens stay viable during phagocytosis since their primary hosts, the PMNs, expose apoptotic cell-associated molecular pattern (ACAMP) signaling "no pathogen".

=== Persistency and attraction ===
The lifespan of neutrophil granulocytes is quite short. They circulate in bloodstream for about 6 to 10 hours after leaving bone marrow, whereupon they undergo spontaneous apoptosis. Microbial pathogens have been reported to influence cellular apoptosis by different strategies. Obviously because of the inhibition of caspase3-activation, L. major can induce the delay of neutrophils apoptosis and extend their lifespan for at least 2–3 days. The fact of extended lifespan is very beneficial for the development of infection because the final host cells for these parasites are macrophages, which normally migrate to the sites of infection within two or three days. The pathogens are not dronish; instead they take over the command at the primary site of infection. They induce the production by PMNs of the chemokines MIP-1α and MIP-1β (macrophage inflammatory protein) to recruit macrophages.

An important factor in prolonging infection is the inhibition of the adaptive immune system. This occurs especially during the intercellular phases, when amastigotes search for new macrophages to infect and are more susceptible to immune responses. Nearly all types of phagocytes are targeted. For example, mincle has been shown to be targeted by L. major. Interaction between mincle and a protein released by the parasite results in a weakened immune response in dendritic cells.

=== Silent phagocytosis theory ===
To save the integrity of the surrounding tissue from the toxic cell components and proteolytic enzymes contained in neutrophils, the apoptotic PMNs are silently cleared by macrophages. Dying PMNs expose the "eat me"-signal phosphatidylserine which is transferred to the outer leaflet of the plasma membrane during apoptosis. By reason of delayed apoptosis, the parasites that persist in PMNs are taken up into macrophages, employing an absolutely physiological and nonphlogistic process. The strategy of this "silent phagocytosis" has the following advantages for the parasite:

- Taking up apoptotic cells silences macrophage killing activity leading to a survival of the pathogens.
- Pathogens inside of PMNs have no direct contact to the macrophage surface receptors, because they can not see the parasite inside the apoptotic cell. So, the activation of the phagocyte for immune activation does not occur.

However, studies have shown this is unlikely, as the pathogens are seen to leave apoptotic cells and no evidence is known of macrophage uptake by this method.

== Molecular biology ==
An important aspect of the Leishmania protozoan is its glycoconjugate layer of lipophosphoglycan (LPG). This is held together with a phosphoinositide membrane anchor, and has a tripartite structure consisting of a lipid domain, a neutral hexasaccharide, and a phosphorylated galactose-mannose, with a termination in a neutral cap. Not only do these parasites develop postphlebotomus digestion, but it is also thought to be essential to oxidative bursts, thus allowing passage for infection. Characteristics of intracellular digestion include an endosome fusing with a lysosome, releasing acid hydrolases which degrade DNA, RNA, proteins and carbohydrates.

== Genomics ==
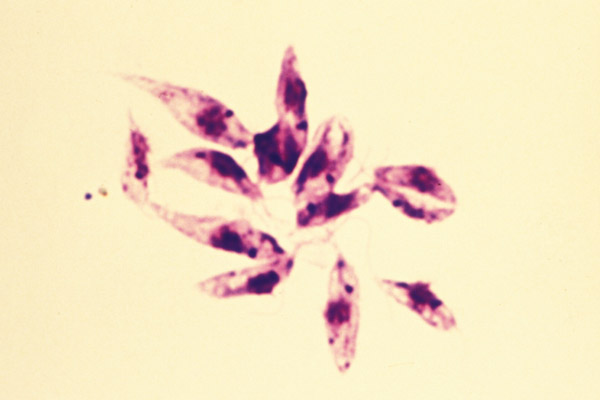
Leishmania tropica

The genomes of four Leishmania species (L. major, L. infantum, L. donovani and L. braziliensis) have been sequenced, revealing more than 8300 protein-coding and 900 RNA genes. Almost 40% of protein-coding genes fall into 662 families containing between two and 500 members. Most of the smaller gene families are tandem arrays of one to three genes, while the larger gene families are often dispersed in tandem arrays at different loci throughout the genome. Each of the 35 or 36 chromosomes is organized into a small number of gene clusters of tens-to-hundreds of genes on the same DNA strand. These clusters can be organized in head-to-head (divergent) or tail-to-tail (convergent) fashion, with the latter often separated by tRNA, rRNA and/or snRNA genes. Transcription of protein-coding genes initiates bidirectionally in the divergent strand-switch regions between gene clusters and extends polycistronically through each gene cluster before terminating in the strand-switch region separating convergent clusters. Leishmania telomeres are usually relatively small, consisting of a few different types of repeat sequence. Evidence can be found for recombination between several different groups of telomeres. The L. major and L. infantum genomes contain only about 50 copies of inactive degenerated Ingi/L1Tc-related elements (DIREs), while L. braziliensis also contains several telomere-associated transposable elements and spliced leader-associated retroelements. The Leishmania genomes share a conserved core proteome of about 6200 genes with the related trypanosomatids Trypanosoma brucei and Trypanosoma cruzi, but around 1000 Leishmania-specific genes are known, which are mostly randomly distributed throughout the genome. Relatively few (about 200) species-specific differences in gene content exist between the three sequenced Leishmania genomes, but about 8% of the genes appear to be evolving at different rates between the three species, indicative of different selective pressures that could be related to disease pathology. About 65% of protein-coding genes currently lack functional assignment.

Leishmania species produce several different heat shock proteins. These include Hsp83, a homolog of Hsp90. A regulatory element in the 3' UTR of Hsp83 controls translation of Hsp83 in a temperature-sensitive manner. This region forms a stable RNA structure which melts at higher temperatures.

== Genomic instability ==
Leishmania lacks of promoter-dependent regulation, so its genomic regulation is at post-transcriptional level through copy number variations (CNV) of transcripts, a mechanism capable of controlling the abundance of these transcripts according to the situation in which the organism finds itself. These processes cause a great susceptibility to genomic instability in the parasite. This involves epistatic interactions between genes, which drive these changes in gene expression, leading to compensatory mechanisms in the Leishmania genome that result in the adaptive evolution of the parasite. During the research carried out by Giovanni Bussotti and collaborators at the Pasteur Institute, belonging to the University of Paris, a genome-wide association study (GWAS) of Leishmania donovani identified CNVs in 14% of the coding regions and in 4% of the non-coding regions. In addition, an experimental evolution study (EE Approach) was performed on L. donovani amastigotes obtained from clinical cases of hamsters. By extracting these amastigotes from infected organisms and culturing them in vitro for 36 weeks (3800 generations), it was demonstrated how genomic instability in this parasite is capable of adapting to complicated situations, such as in vitro culture. An 11kb deletion was detected in the gene coding for Ld1S_360735700, a NIMA-related kinase with key functions in the correct progression of mitosis. With the advancement of in vitro culture generations the loss of the kinase becomes more notorious, decreasing growth rate of the parasite, but the genomic instability of Leishmania manages, through compensatory mechanisms, to attenuate this reduction in growth so that the in vitro culture is maintained. First, as an adaptation of the culture to the loss of this kinase, it was detected an increase in the expression of another orthologous kinase (Ld1S_360735800) whose coding region is adjacent to that of the lost kinase. Secondly, a reduction in the expression of 23 transcripts related to flagellar biogenesis was observed. So adaptation in Leishmania leads the parasite to eliminate flagellar movement from its needs, since it is not necessary in in vitro culture, preserving the energy invested in this movement to increase the growth rate and compensating the loss of the kinase. Finally, coamplification of ribosomal protein clusters, ribosomal RNA (rRNA), transfer RNA (tRNA) and nucleolar small RNA (snoRNA) was observed. Increased expression of these clusters leads to increased ribosomal biogenesis and protein biosynthesis. This is most evident in the case of small nucleolar RNAs (snoRNA), for which amplification of a large cluster of 15 snoRNAs was observed on chromosome 33. The function of these nucleic acids is methylation and inclusion of pseudouridine in ribosomes. In this case, an increase in these modifications was observed in the large subunits of the ribosomes of individuals in culture, specifically in the PTC (peptidyl transferase center) and in the mRNA entry tunnel to the ribosome for protein synthesis. These changes lead to an increase in ribosomal biogenesis, resulting in increased protein synthesis and growth rate. In conclusion, the loss of the kinase is compensated by the genomic instability of Leishmania donovani by increasing the expression of another orthologous kinase, decreasing flagellar biogenesis and increasing ribosomal biogenesis. These compensations result in the growth rate of the culture being as less affected as possible by the initial loss of the kinase, and the parasite is perfectly adapted to the in vitro culture, which is not its natural habitat.

== Sexual reproduction ==
A microbial pathogen's reproductive system is one of the basic biologic processes that condition the microorganism's ecology and disease spread. In 2009 Akopyants et al. demonstrated that L. major has a sexual cycle, including a meiotic process. Hybrid progeny are formed that have full genomic complements from both parents. Mating only occurs in the sand fly vector, and hybrids can be transmitted to the mammalian host by sand fly bite. In L. braziliensis matings in nature are predominantly between related individuals resulting in extreme inbreeding. The rate of outcrossing between different strains of Leishmania in the sand fly vector depends on the frequency of co-infection. Such outcrossing events appear to be rare in L. major and L. donovani.

L. infantum produces proteins BRCA1 and RAD51 that interact with each other to promote homologous recombinational repair. These proteins play a key role in meiosis. Thus, meiotic events provide the adaptive advantage of efficient recombinational repair of DNA damages even when they do not lead to outcrossing

== See also ==
- Canine leishmaniasis
- List of parasites (human)
