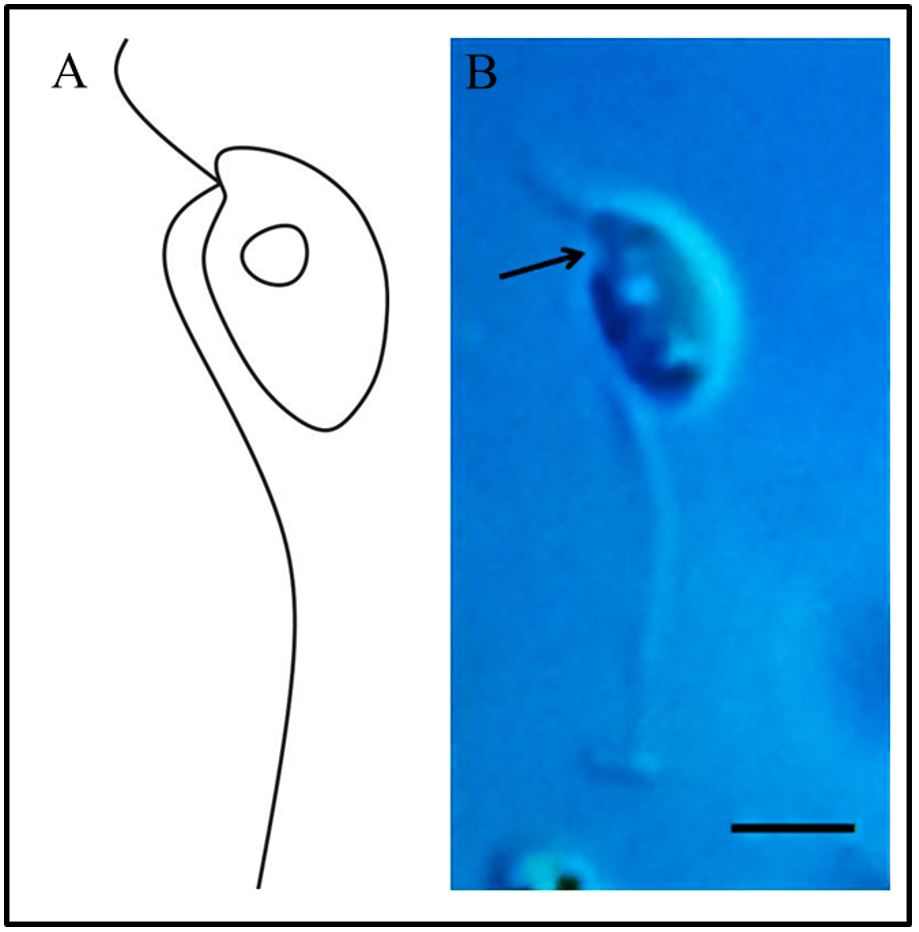
- Neobodo designis (A) Schematic drawing; (B) Photo, where the arrow indicates the apical flagellar pocket. Scale of 5 µm

Scientific classification
- Domain: Eukaryota
- Supergroup: Discoba
- Phylum: Euglenozoa
- Class: Kinetoplastea
- Order: Neobodonida
- Family: Neobodonidae
- Genus: Neobodo; Vickerman, 2004

Species
- Neobodo alexeieffii (Lemmermann, 1913); Neobodo amoebinus (Lemmermann, 1908); Neobodo borokensis; Neobodo caudatus (Dujardin, 1841); Neobodo celer (Klebs, 1892); Neobodo compressus (Moroff, 1903); Neobodo cruzi (Hartmann & Chagas, 1910); Neobodo curvifilus; Neobodo designis (Skuja) Moreira, Lopez-Garcia & Vickerman, 2004; Neobodo cf. designis; Neobodo fusiformis (Stokes, 1890); Neobodo globosus (Stein, 1878); Neobodo sp. KL; Neobodo minimus (Klebs, 1892); Neobodo mutabilis (Klebs, 1892); Neobodo ovatus (Dujardin, 1841); Neobodo putrinus (Stokes, 1881); Neobodo repens (Klebs, 1892); Neobodo saliens; Neobodo underboolensis (Ruinen, 1938)

Synonyms
- Alphamonas

= Neobodo =

Genus of protists

Neobodo are diverse protists belonging to the eukaryotic supergroup Excavata. They are Kinetoplastids in the subclass Bodonidae. They are small, free-living, heterotrophic flagellates with two flagella of unequal length used to create a propulsive current for feeding. As members of Kinetoplastids, they have an evident kinetoplast There was much confusion and debate within the class Kinetoplastid and subclass Bodonidae regarding the classification of the organism, but finally the new genera Neobodo was proposed by Keith Vickerman. Although they are one of the most common flagellates found in freshwater, they are also able to tolerate saltwater Their ability to alternate between both marine and freshwater environments in many parts of the world give them a “cosmopolitan” character. Due to their relatively microscopic size ranging between 4–12 microns, they are further distinguished as heterotrophic nanoflagellates. This small size ratio limits them as bacterivores that swim around feeding on bacteria attached to surfaces or in aggregates.

== Etymology ==
The prefix ‘Neo-’ comes from the ancient Greek word for ‘neos’ which signifies 'young'. Attaching the prefix to the original bodonid species, neobodo literally means a “new” bodonid species.

== History of Knowledge ==
The order Neobodonida was proposed by a researcher, Keith Vickerman, based on significant characteristics that differed from the original bodonid species. Differing characteristics included: being phagotrophic, Polykinetoplastic/eukinetoplastic, biflagellate with usually both flagella lacking hairs, having a posterior flagellum attached to the body or free of it, and having an apical cytostome. Many Neobodo species derived from Bodo species, and by recognizing these differences, they were tentatively assigned to the new genus Neobodo by adding the ‘neo’ prefix. Through studies on the ultrastructure of Bodo designis, researchers discovered the possession of a ‘microtubular prism’ supporting the cytostome–cytopharynx, as well as a significantly different feeding apparatus from other bodonids, thus proposing the new species as Neobodo designis. Through this discovery, they were proposed as the type species of the new genus Neobodo. Neobodo have very close connections with Kinetoplastid protists. Kinetoplastid protists belong together with euglenids and diplonemids, to the phylum Euglenozoa, and are grouped in the class Kinetoplastea. The name of kinetoplastid is derived from the presence of a characteristic structure called the kinetoplast which is a mass of concentrated extranuclear DNA within a mitochondrion. In the past, kinetoplastids were classified into two major suborder groups via morphology-based taxonomic criteria: either as parasitic uniflagellate trypanosomatids, or biflagellate bodonids. Originally, Vickerman proposed two families, Bodonidae and Cryptobiidae, but later on re-unified all bodonids within the single family, Bodonidae. Based on comparisons of RNA sequences and molecular phylogenetic analyses, it was suggested that the trypanosomatids also emerged from within the bodonids. Moreover, recent research of deep-sea hydrothermal vent samples at the Mid-Atlantic Ridge and analysis via PCR amplification reported several new kinetoplastid-like sequences. Researchers David Moreira, Purificacion Lopez-Garcıa, and Keith Vickerman analyzed the phylogeny of these kinetoplastids and found a much more stable phylogeny that supported the monophyly of groups that typically emerged as polyphyletic in the trees rooted using the traditional, distant outgroup sequences. As a result, the classification of the class Kinetoplastea was divided as two new subclasses:

- Prokinetoplastina -containing various bodonid species, and
- Metakinetoplastina -including the Trypanosomatida and three additional new orders:
  - Eubodonida
  - Parabodonida
  - Neobodonida

Through this process, Neobodo was created as a new genus, along with the revision of the classification of species formerly included in the genus Bodo and the amendment of the genus Parabodo.

== Description ==
The new genus Neobodo is characterized as solitary phagotrophic flagellates with a single discrete eukinetoplast. They are known for having an apical cytostome and cytopharynx supported by a prismatic rod of microtubules.

Neobodo cells are usually elongate and elliptical in shape and somewhat inflexible. They range from 4 to 12 microns long, but are mostly 6 to 9 microns. They have a nucleus near the middle of the cell and two unequal, heterodynamic flagella emerging from a shallow, subapical pocket. The anterior flagellum appears inactive and just wraps around the anterior part of the cell. It is about the same length or slightly shorter than the cell. It is held forward with a single anterior curve that is held perpendicular to the substrate and curves back over the rostrum. The acronematic posterior flagellum is trailed and sometimes forms an undulating membrane. It is typically directed straight behind the cell and is about 2 to 4 times the length of the cell. The proximal part of the posterior flagellum is accompanied with a paraxial rod and sometimes non-tubular mastigonemes. The cells use their posterior flagellum and rotate around their longitudinal axes to swim and glide along in rapid darts of straight lines.

Along with their two flagella, they have two nearly parallel basal bodies. They also house discoid shaped mitochondrial cristae and a compact kinetoplast (a DNA-containing granule located within a single mitochondrion) that is associated with the flagellar bases. The kinetoplasts are naked, but the cytoskeletal microtubules beneath the cell membrane are developed. They have a cytoplasm usually filled with symbiotic bacteria and small glycosomes that possess glycolytic enzymes. Although sexual reproduction is unknown and cysts have not been found to date, they are able to reproduce asexually by means of binary fission.

== Habitat and Ecology ==
Bodonid flagellates (class Kinetoplastea) are abundant, free-living bacterivores that occur in a wide variety of environments including freshwater, soil and marine habitats ranging from the tropics to the Arctic. Neobodo is one of the most common flagellates in freshwater environments, but can also tolerate marine environments with low salinities of 3–4 ppt. Strains of Neobodo species isolated from different environments fall exclusively into marine and freshwater lineages. Studies show that Neobodo is a complex and ancient species with a major marine clade nested among older freshwater clades. This suggests that these lineages were constrained physiologically from moving between these environments for most of their long history. Their broad physiological tolerance enables them to easily interchange between marine and freshwater environments, which gives them a cosmopolitan characteristic and a wide ecological tolerance. Recent evidence for Neobodo designis suggested notable divergence between freshwater and marine strains and all strains exhibited extensive genetic diversity. Epifluorescent microscopy studies reported the abundance of several heterotrophic nanoflagellate groups (including bodonids) in the euphotic zone of different marine areas. Areas include the Mediterranean Sea, Norwegian Sea, the Indian Ocean and around the Antarctic Peninsula. Throughout the numerous oceans, large fractions of small heterotrophic flagellates with few morphological features remain unidentified. Therefore there is a high possibility that there are many bodonids among the unidentified that have not yet been studied.

Although Neobodo are surface organisms, typically found in surface waters, studies have shown their ability to tolerate deep water conditions. Due to advection or attachment to sinking particles, microbes from the surface of the ocean are continuously transported to deeper areas. The vast majority of the marine environment consists of dark, cold, high-pressure environments, which increases with depth. When cultures of Neobodo were isolated from surface waters and were put in different deep-sea temperatures and pressures, the abundance of protists declined in all treatments, with a significantly greater rate of mortality under combined cold temperature and high pressure conditions than in the cold temperature-only conditions. However, an average of 6.1% of N. designis cells survived in the high pressure treatments, indicating that some fraction of sinking protists can survive transport to the deep ocean. In addition, after a period of acclimation, positive growth rates were measured in some cases. This suggests that surface-adapted flagellates can not only survive under deep-sea conditions but are able to reproduce and potentially provide seed populations in cold, high-pressure environments. Although Neobodo are not abundant in the deep oceans, they are capable of surviving in the deep waters, tolerating high pressure and low temperature conditions.

== Feeding ==
Neobodo are free-living and active microbial predators that swim around and feed on prey in aquatic ecosystems. As free-living flagellates, they are the most important bacterivorous forms in aquatic environments. Neobodo, like other bodonids, are heterotrophic flagellates (HF) which are a very diverse and heterogeneous group of protists with a size range between 1 and 450 microns. They play an essential role in aquatic and terrestrial food webs as major consumers of bacterial biomass. The predator to prey size ratio limits the maximal size difference between bacteria and their predator: Neobodo. The marine environment presents additional constraints, imposed by the typical small size and low abundance of bacteria. In these conditions, physical and hydrodynamic considerations theoretically restrict Neobodo’s feeding to graze on small bacteria, typically within the nanoplankton. Most bacterivorous protists in the marine pelagic zone are generally in the size range of 2–5 microns and are classified as a functional group called heterotrophic nanoflagellates. The predominance of heterotrophic nanoflagellates as marine bacterivores has been confirmed by manipulations with size-fractionated natural assemblages and by direct observation of protists with ingested fluorescent bacteria. More specifically, Neobodo are interception feeders, meaning they feed on bacteria attached to surfaces/biofilms or in aggregates. They press their mouth against food and are often aided by a pseudopod-like structure (pharynx) to detach bacteria. Within this feeding mechanism, further variability in terms of feeding behavior and selection strategies can be observed among different species.

== Practical importance ==
Despite the ecological and evolutionary significance of these organisms, many of their biological and pathological features are currently unknown. Through metatranscriptomics using RNA-seq technology combined with field-emission microscopy the virulence factors of a recently described genus of Neobodonida that is considered to be responsible for Ascidian Soft Tunic Syndrome (AsSTS) was revealed. AsSTS is a disease of the edible ascidian, Halocynthia roretzi, which has done enormous damage to the Korean and Japanese aquaculture. AsSTS is characterized by changes in the tunic (the outermost barrier against the environment), including elasticity loss and subsequent rupture leading to thinner bundled tunic fibers and coarser tunic matrices. However, the pathogenesis is unclear and is still an area of research.

== List of species (or of lower taxonomic units) ==
Despite the considerable interest in free-living bodonids, their true biodiversity has most likely been grossly underestimated by simple light microscopy, as it does not differentiate most ‘species’ very well. rRNA gene primers were used to test Neobodo’s global distribution and genetic diversity. The non-overlap between environmental DNA sequences and those from cultures suggests that there are hundreds, possibly thousands, of different rRNA gene sequences of free-living Neobodo species globally. Some of the species identified to date are:

- Neobodo designis
- Neobodo cf. designis
- Neobodo curvifilus
- Neobodo saliens
- Neobodo sp. KL
- Neobodo borokensis
