= Dimastigella =

Scientific classification
- Domain: Eukaryota
- Clade: Discoba
- Phylum: Euglenozoa
- Class: Kinetoplastea
- Order: Neobodonida
- Family: Rhynchomonadidae
- Genus: Dimastigella

Species
- Dimastigella trypaniformis; Dimastigella mimosa

Genus of biflagellates

Dimastigella (/daɪˈmæstɪˌdʒɛlə/, dy-MA-stih-JEH-lə) is a biflagellate genus from the larger class Kinetoplastea. This class is identifiable by the presence of complex mitochondrial DNA structures known as kinetoplast DNA (kDNA). kDNA is composed of fewer, larger maxicircles, and smaller and more numerous minicircles, each containing different types of genetic information. Dimastigella has been found in a variety of environments including as a free-living flagellate in soils and in the gut of termites. The type species, Dimastigella trypaniformis was first described very briefly by Harold Sandon in 1928 in his study of the different soil protozoa. The genus Dimastigella currently contains only two species, D. trypaniformis, and D. mimosa which was described by Frovlov et al. in 1996.

== Habitat and ecology ==
D. trypaniformis can be found in a variety of different environments, including in carbonate-rich soils, loam plots, compost, freshwater and in the gut of termites. D. trypaniformis has also been found in urine and stool samples in humans as well as in urine-soiled cage bedding. Despite this association with animal hosts, D. trypaniformis and other members of the Rhynchomonadidae family have not been found to be parasitic nor the causative agent to pathogenic human infections. In a recent case however, D. trypaniformis was discovered in a urine sample of a patient presenting with symptoms of a urinary tract infection. However, it was not determined to be the definitive cause of the symptoms experienced by the patient. Moreover, the severity of the symptoms were also not thought to be completely attributed to infection by D. trypaniformis.

Infection by other closely related kinetoplastid flagellates like Trypanosoma cruzi and various species of Leishmania are known to cause serious diseases such as Chagas disease and Leishmaniasis. D. trypaniformis grows at temperatures below 34 °C and most optimally at 28 °C, making it unlikely for it to survive in a mammalian host. As suggested by Votýpka et al. (2021), it is also possible that protozoa like D. trypaniformis that are both uncommonly found in mammalian hosts, and previously unknown to be disease-causing will be dismissed as a causal agent as symptoms in an infection. This case prompts for further research about the relationship and nature of infection by D. trypaniformis as, it was not previously known to infect mammalian hosts nor have pathogenic effects.

D. trypaniformis and other soil flagellates primarily feed on bacteria, which, is an important influence on bacterial community structures. Feeding by flagellates can lead to the suppression of pathogenic bacteria in soils and often, enhanced plant growth.

== Description ==
=== Morphology ===
The most distinctive features of Dimastigella are its two flagella, with one flagellum extending from the anterior end and pointing in the forwards direction, and one recurrent flagellum extending towards the posterior end. The recurrent flagellum remains attached to the length of the cell and extends beyond the body. The spindle-shaped body is widest in the medial region and tapers on both ends. Dimastigella has been described to resemble the biflagellate genus Cercomonas but can be differentiated by its attached recurrent flagellum and the absence of cytoplasmic strands. Furthermore, Dimastigella tends to be more spindle-shaped and flattened compared to Cercomonas, which has broader anterior and posterior ends of the cell body. Dimastigella has been observed in both a flagellated trophic form as well as a spherical cyst form. In the trophic form D. trypaniformis are typically around 15.1 μm in length (body) and 2.8 μm in width. The diameter of the cyst ranges between 2.5 – 5.0 μm.

Investigation by Breunig and König in 1993 revealed a short rostrum at the anterior end of the cell where the anterior flagellum is sometimes associated. D. trypaniformis feeds using a cytostome-cytopharynx associated with the rostrum which is spatulate and composed of 8 reinforced microtubules from the anterior basal body. The anterior flagellum is thicker than the posterior recurrent flagellum as it contains a broad paraxial rod. The thinner posterior flagellum contains a smaller paraxial rod in the half nearest to the cell body and is found lodged in a ventral furrow supported by ventral microtubules. The length of the free anterior flagellum tends to be slightly shorter than the length of the body at approximately 12.6 μm, and the length of the free portion of the posterior flagellum is roughly 6.3 μm. The singular flagellar pocket where both flagella extend from is sectioned into two grooves at its base due to the elevated nature of the pocket. The angle between the two basal bodies of the flagella is between 120°-150°.

==== Kinetoplastid features ====
A key feature of kinetoplastids is their pellicular microtubules. In D. trypaniformis, these are bridged and arranged in a "corset" lining the underside of the cell membrane in the anterior region of cell. The cross-linked microtubules forming a singular broad sheet is known as the dorsal fibre and it extends from a microtubule organizing centre (MTOC) in the periphery of the flagellar pocket. Pellicular microtubules have not been found in the posterior region of the cell, which Vickerman (1978) suggests may have been due to culture conditions. Microtubules under the ventral furrow membrane incorporate pellicular microtubules.

==== Feeding ====
The reinforced microtubules support the rostrum and give the cytostome-cytopharynx feeding apparatus a funnel-like appearance. The cytostome is axial and encircled by microtubules. The opening of the cytostome is located below the rostrum where it leads into the cytopharynx. The axis of the rostrum is formed by 6 microtubules connected with two dense fibres which reinforce the microtubules encircling the cytostome. When D. trypaniformis feed, the cytostome expands to allow bacterial prey to enter where it slides into food vacuoles located in the posterior of the cell. Food vacuoles accumulate in the posterior region as D. trypaniformis feeds, resulting in multiple, relatively large compartments containing prey, bacteria, of differing degrees of digestion.

==== Movement ====
D. trypaniformis swims unidirectionally with some flipping movements. The cell body of D. trypaniformis is flexible and spindle-shaped when swimming or moving over a substrate. As the flagellate swims, the anterior flagellum beats helically and rapidly. The recurrent flagellum and posterior of the cell appears to be dragged by the anterior end of the cell which is elevated due to beating of the anterior flagellum. D. trypaniformis has also been described to have a creeping movement quality where the ventral side of the cell remains pressed to the substrate it is moving on. To move in the reverse direction, D. trypaniformis will reverse the direction of the beats. In experiments where D. trypaniformis is compressed on agar, the movement quality changes into a writhing motion on the recurrent flagellum.

==== Cyst ====
There are many factors that can cause protists to encyst but typically relate to the presence of unfavourable environmental conditions. Encysting allows protists to decrease their metabolic activities for short or longer durations of time while taking on a more robust morphology that allows them to withstand a greater range of environmental conditions. This tends to increase chances of survival until more favourable conditions arise where protists can then excyst back into their free-living forms.

When Dimastigella encyst, they are typically between 2.5-5.0 μm in diameter and have smooth, thick walls. As the cyst wall is formed, the flagella are retracted into the cell body with the posterior recurrent flagellum descending into the membrane which it is associated with. The cell overall becomes pear-shaped before rounding into a spherical structure. The cyst wall contains two layers with a fuzzy coat covering the thinner, denser external layer, and a thicker internal layer. Organelles are challenging to distinguish in the mature cyst, but the nucleus and chromatin contained inside remains visible in electron micrographs. While able to encyst like species of Bodo, D. trypaniformis can be differentiated by a lack of a fibrillar quality in the cyst walls seen in that of Bodo.

==== Other cytoplasmic organelles ====
D. trypaniformis contains a contractile vacuole located next to the flagellar pocket and posterior to the basal bodies. The Golgi apparatus is situated below the contractile vacuole.

=== Genetics ===
==== Mitosis and the kinetoplast ====
In Dimastigella mimosa, the nucleus remains in the centre of the cell body during interphase and has a spherical to slightly elongated shape. The porous nuclear membrane has ribosomes associated on its exterior. Chromatin is condensed and located underneath the inner nuclear membrane in distinctive fragments. The nucleolus contains fibrillar and granular components and is located in the centre of the nucleus. Dimastigella divide by a closed mitosis with an internal spindle without overly condensing its chromosomes, a characteristic trait of mitosis in members of kinetoplastids.

To better describe the events of mitosis in kinetoplastids, new names to describe the stages have been suggested by Solari (1980) to be, preliminary, equatorial, elongational, and reorganizative. During the preliminary stage in Dimastigella mimosa, the chromatin in the periphery of the nucleus decondense while the nuclear envelope remains intact. The nuclear envelope pinches at two ends to separate the two daughter nuclei once mitosis is completed. The chromatin begins to recondense near the inner membrane of the nuclear envelope and cytokinesis follows to produce two daughter cells. In D. mimosa, the basal bodies are not involved in nuclear division. A key difference in mitosis of D. mimosa distinguishing it from that in other kinetoplastids is the absence of the equatorial stage where the kinetochore pairs would align in the centre of the nucleus. In D. mimosa, kinetochore pairs have only been observed in the periphery of the nucleus. Another key difference relates is that spindle and nuclear pole structures are formed later in D. mimosa compared to other kinetoplastids during the late phase of elongation. The reorganizative stage in D. mimosa is consistent with what would be expected in other kinetoplastids with the daughter nuclei separating.

==== Mitochondrion and Kinetoplastid DNA ====
As a member of the order kinetoplastida, Dimastigella contains a singular mitochondrion. In D. trypaniformis, the mitochondrion appears branched with the branches being more concentrated in the anterior region of the cell body. The cristae of the mitochondrion are disc-shaped. A key feature of Kinetoplastida is the presence of kinetoplast DNA (kDNA) located in their mitochondrion.

There are two types of kDNA, maxicircles and minicircles, with maxicircles are the larger type of kDNA containing more base pairs, and minicircles having fewer base pairs. In Dimastigella, the kDNA is present as discrete, uniformly sized nucleoids called polykinetoplast DNA (poly-kDNA) which are dispersed through the mitochondrion. This is one of the features that distinguishes Dimastigella from other kinetoplastids like Bodo saltans which contain kDNA as a singular complex. There is also evidence from research by Štolba et al. (2001) to further support that that the minicircles are loosely contained and the poly-kDNA are indeed spread throughout the mitochondrion. This also differentiates Dimastigella from another similar bodonid Cryptobia helicis which despite having similarly spread distribution of kDNA within their mitochondrion, have supercoiled minicircles as opposed to the open circle conformation (not supercoiled) observed in Dimastigella.

== History ==
D. trypaniformis Sandon was first described by Sandon in 1928 who conducted a study of the different protozoa found in soils from various parts of North America. In samples from Logan, Utah, and New Brunswick, Canada, an unknown flagellate was found and initially called Dimastigamoeba trypaniformis. Sandon later describes the flagellate in the same paper, giving it a new genus and species name, Dimastigella trypaniformis, the type species of the genus Dimastigella. In 1978, Vickerman conducted a study of the flagellate using light and electron microscopy and redescribed both the genus Dimastigella and its type species.

Designations for different strains were assigned after Breunig et al. (1993) isolated D. trypaniformis from the gut of the termite Mastotermes darwiniensis (Froggatt). Dimastigella trypaniformis found in soil samples were designated as the Glasgow strain, and those isolated from the gut of termites being known as the Ulm strain. Despite the differences in the environments they are found in, sequencing of 16S-like RNA coding regions in both strains by Berchtold et al. (1993) confirmed they are most likely the same species as over 98% of the nuclear sequences were shared with very few dissimilarities overall. In 1996, Frovlov et al. (1996) described the second species in the genus, Dimastigella mimosa after isolating the flagellate from samples from sewage tanks in Yaroslavl, Russia. Dimastigella mimosa was distinguished as a species separate from D. trypaniformis due to differences in morphologies.
