= Jarrellia =

Scientific classification
- Domain: Eukaryota
- Clade: Discoba
- Phylum: Euglenozoa
- Class: Kinetoplastea
- Subclass: incertae sedis
- Genus: Jarrellia; Poynton, Whitaker & Heinrich 2001
- Species: J. atramenti

Binomial name
- Jarrellia atramenti Poynton, Whitaker & Heinrich 2001

Genus of flagellates

Jarrellia is a genus of kinetoplastids containing a single species, Jarrellia atramenti, described from the blowhole mucus of a pygmy sperm whale. It is the first flagellate isolated from a marine mammal.

== Etymology ==
The generic name Jarrellia was chosen in memory of Cheri Jarrell, a volunteer in the Marine Animal Rescue Program at the National Aquarium in Baltimore, whose collection and archival of samples allowed for the description of this organism. The specific epithet atramenti (meaning 'of ink', genitive case of the Latin noun atramentum meaning ink) refers to the name 'Inky' that was given to the whale, in reference to the unique ability of pygmy sperm whales to release liquid feces in the form of dark reddish-brown clouds of ink when feeding and/or threatened.

== Description ==
Jarrellia atramenti is a species of kinetoplastid, a group of single-celled flagellates that include many parasites, all characterized by the presence of a kinetoplast. Its cells have two flagella each: a longer anterior flagellum that moves in a whiplash motion, and a shorter posterior flagellum that trails behind when swimming and forms a prominent undulating membrane that extends at least two-thirds the length of the cell body. The tip of this posterior flagellum attaches to the host. The cells move in a gliding motility. Inside the cell is an oval nucleus and a fragmented, variably dispersed kinetoplast. It has been observed maturing and undergoing cell division in the blowhole mucus of its host, the cetacean Kogia breviceps (pygmy sperm whale).

This organism most closely resembles the genus Trypanoplasma in terms of motility and morphology, but the structure of the kinetoplast is distinct, as it is unfragmented and rod-like in Trypanoplasma cells. In addition, Trypanoplasma have not been observed attaching to host material via a flagellum. The habitat, attachment and kinetoplast structure most resembles that of the bodonid Cryptobia, but the prominent undulating membrane has not been found in this genus.

== Taxonomy ==
On 25 November, 1993, a stranded juvenile pygmy sperm whale was rescued from near Brigantine, New Jersey and brought to the National Aquarium of Baltimore. The whale was rehabilitated and released to the Gulf Stream from Florida on 5 May, 1994. Throughout its six month-long rehabilitation, mucus samples of its blowhole were monitored for microbes, blood cells, and epithelial cells. Among the samples, the new kinetoplastid species was discovered and continuously reported across the months.

Jarrellia atramenti was first identified as a bodonid kinetoplastid. Due to its similarities to the bodonid genera Trypanoplasma and Cryptobia and its unique combination of cellular features, it was proposed as a separate genus. Its description was considered the first published report of a flagellate isolated from a marine mammal, and among the first reports of trypanoplasm-like kinetoplastids from warm-blooded hosts; they were previously considered unable to survive the elevated body temperature of mammals.

No molecular data was obtained from this organism. After the split of bodonids into three orders, Eubodonida, Neobodonida and Parabodonida, Jarrellia was tentatively placed among parabodonids due to its superficial resemblance to Trypanoplasma. However, it was eventually classified as an incertae sedis kinetoplastid, as no reliable evidence supports its assignment to one of the orders.
