= Allobodo =

Scientific classification
- Domain: Eukaryota
- Supergroup: Discoba
- Phylum: Euglenozoa
- Class: Kinetoplastea
- Order: Neobodonida
- Family: Allobodonidae
- Genus: Allobodo; Goodwin et al. 2018

Type species
- Allobodo chlorophagus Goodwin et al. 2018

Species
- A. chlorophagus; A. yubaba

Genus of biflagellates

Allobodo is a genus of biflagellate kinetoplastids and a member of the family Allobodonidae. It is closely related to Novijibodo.

== Characteristics ==
Allobodo is a biflagellate kinetoplastid. Its cells have a short anterior rostrum. One species, Allobodo chlorophagus, is known to feed on the invasive green alga Codium fragile. A. chlorophagus has a pankinetoplast, while Allobodo yubaba has a eukinetoplast.

== Etymology ==
The generic name comes from "Allo-", meaning another, and "-bodo", which refers to Bodo, another kinetoplastid genus.

== Taxonomy ==
In 2018, the genus Allobodo was described along with its only species A. chlorophagus. The genus was assigned to a new family Allobodonidae in the order Neobodonida. In 2025, another species called A. yubaba was described, along with a new genus called Novijibodo, which was also assigned to Allobodonidae.

== Phylogeny ==
Results of a phylogeny generated in 2025:

- Allobodonidae
  - - Allobodo
      - A. yubaba
      - A. chlorophagus
    - Marine clade
  - - Novijibodo
    - Freshwater clade
