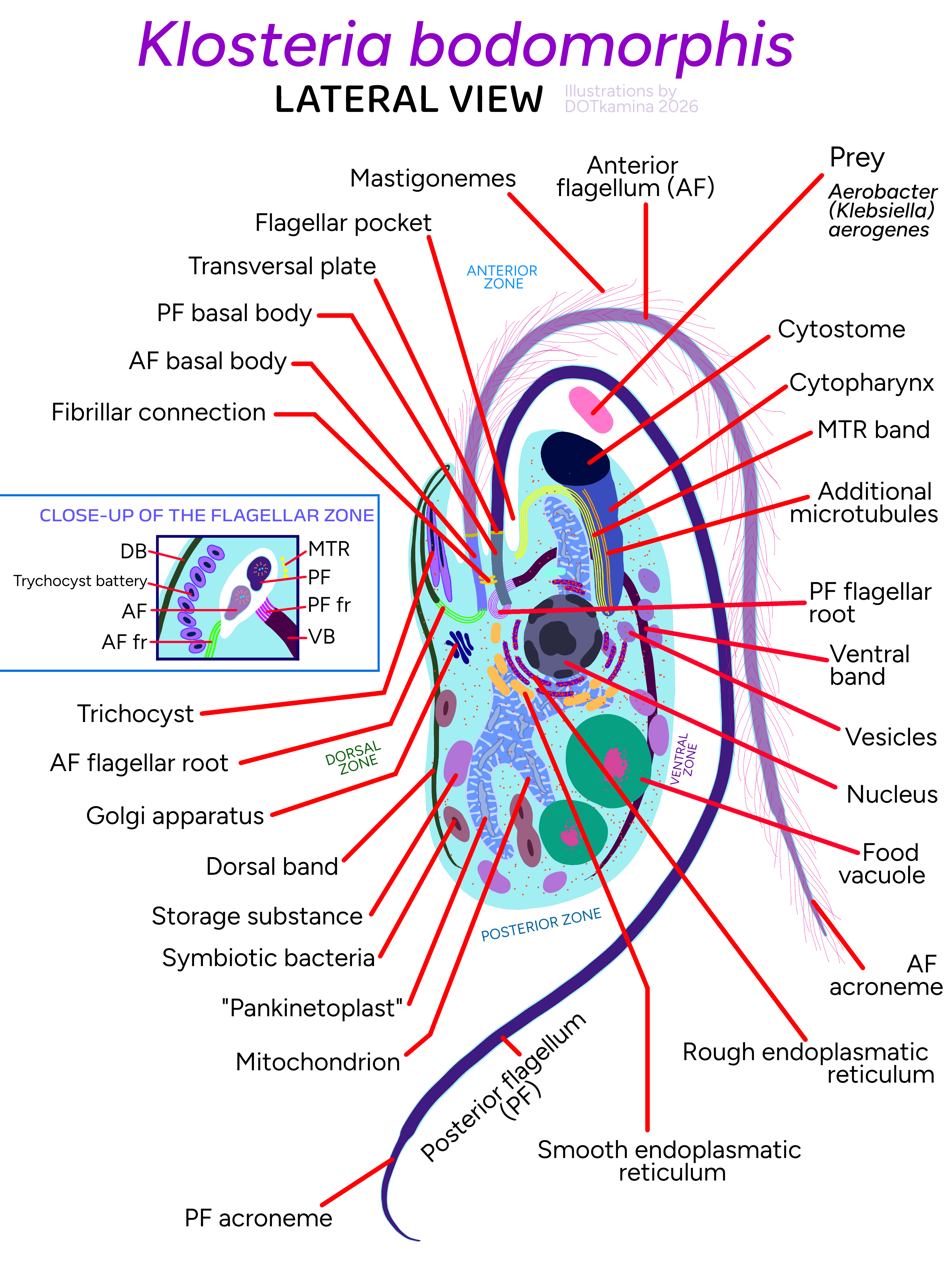
- Klosteria bodomorphis microanatomy

Scientific classification
- Domain: Eukaryota
- Clade: Discoba
- Phylum: Euglenozoa
- Class: Kinetoplastea
- Order: Neobodonida
- Family: Neobodonidae
- Genus: Klosteria; Mylnikov & Nikolaev, 2003
- Species: K. bodomorphis

Binomial name
- Klosteria bodomorphis Mylnikov & Nikolaev, 2003

= Klosteria =

Genus of protists

Klosteria is a genus of free-living neobodonid kinetoplastids. It was isolated from samples from the Baltic Sea in 1994, in the town of Kloster, Germany. It is a bacterivorous organism. It currently includes only one species, Klosteria bodomorphis.

== Description. ==
The organism has two heterodynamic flagella, although it may have four. These flagella emerge from the cytoplasm at the flagellar pocket. The terminal ends of the flagella are thin and are known as acronemes. It feeds by phagocytosis through the cytostome-cytopharynx system. Ingested bacteria are packaged into food vacuoles for digestion. Symbiotic bacteria and granules of storage substances are also present. Vesicles are found in the lower region of the cytopharynx.

Each flagellum originates from a basal body. The basal body of the anterior flagellum is anchored by a flagellar root of 2 to 3 microtubules, which connects to a dorsal band of 25 or more microtubules. The basal body of the posterior flagellum is anchored by a flagellar root of 6 microtubules, which connects to a ventral band of 27 microtubules. The MTR (microtubular reinforced) band originates in the wall of the flagellar poker and extends into the cytopharynx.

Klosteria bodomorphis has a single mitochondrion, the branching of which is debated. DNA has been identified within the mitochondrion that could be interpreted as kDNA (kinetoplast), specifically the pankinetoplast type (kDNA organized in isotropic bundles).
