= Cryptaulaxella elegans =

Scientific classification
- Domain: Eukaryota
- Phylum: Euglenozoa
- Class: Kinetoplastea
- Order: Neobodonida
- Family: Neobodonidae
- Genus: Cryptaulaxella
- Species: C. elegans

Binomial name
- Cryptaulaxella elegans Larsen & Patterson, 1990

Species of single-celled organism

Cryptaulaxella elegans (previously known as Cryptaulax elegans) is a species of kinetoplastid previously classified as a cryptomonad. It was found in tropical marine sediments.
