= Ernst Lemmermann =

German botanist

Ernst Johann Lemmermann (27 May 1867 in Bremen – 11 May 1915 in Bremen) was a German botanist who specialized in the field of phycology.

During his career he taught classes (Seminarlehrer) in Bremen, where he also worked as a botanical assistant at the Städtisches Museum für Natur-, Völker- und Handelskunde. In Bremen he was an instructor to biologist Friedrich Hustedt (1886-1968), who named the diatom species of Achnanthes lemmermannii in honor of his former teacher in 1933.

He was also honoured in 1942, in Lemmermanniella, which is a genus of cyanobacteria belonging to the family Synechococcaceae, and Lemmermannia which is a genus of fresh water trebouxiophyceans, named in 1904. Also, the blue-green algae species, Anabaena lemmermannii was named after Lemmermann, now a synonym of Dolichospermum lemmermannii (P.G.Richt.) Wacklin, L.Hoffm. & Komárek.

== Published works ==
- Algologische Beiträge (IV-V), 1898.
- Ergebnisse einer Reise nach dem Pacific (H. Schauinsland, 1896/97) : Plankton-algen, 1899 - Findings from a journey to the Pacific (Hugo Hermann Schauinsland, 1896-97): Plankton-algae.
- Das Genus Ophiocytium Naegeli, 1899.
- Flagellatae, Chlorophyceae, Coccosphaerales und Silicoflagellatae (1908) in: Nordisches Plankton by Karl Andreas Heinrich Brandt and Carl Apstein (editors) – Flagellatae, Chlorophyceae, Coccosphaerales and Silicoflagellatae.
- Das Plankton schwedischer Gewässer, 1904 - Plankton of Swedish waterways.
- Pantostomatineae, Protomastiginae, distomatinae, 1914.
