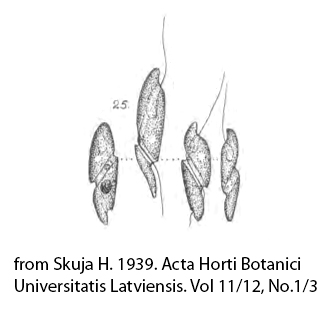
- Original drawing of Cryptaulaxella akopos (as Spiromonas akopos) by Skuja, 1939

Scientific classification
- Domain: Eukaryota
- Clade: Discoba
- Phylum: Euglenozoa
- Class: Kinetoplastea
- Order: Neobodonida
- Family: Neobodonidae
- Genus: Cryptaulaxella; Kostygov 2021

Species
- See text

Synonyms
- Spiromonas Skuja 1939; Cryptaulax Skuja 1948; Cryptaulaxoides Novarino 1996

= Cryptaulaxella =

Genus of single-celled organisms

Cryptaulaxella (from Greek κρυπτός 'hidden' and αὖλαξ 'furrow') is a genus of kinetoplastids. It was previously known as Spiromonas, a genus introduced by Skuja in 1939, but the name was preoccupied by a dinoflagellate genus Spiromonas. Later, in 1948, Skuja renamed it to Cryptaulax, and considered it to be a type of cryptomonad. Subsequent studies suggested that it was a euglenozoan. Because Skuja had clearly misidentified the flagellate as a cryptomonad, Vørs argued that at least some species should be placed in the euglenozoan genus Rhynchobodo, but this opinion did not reach consensus. The similarity of the general morphology of C. akopus with other species that have been studied in more detail and deemed to be euglenozoan support the argument that the genus is euglenozoan. In 1996, due to the name Cryptaulax being preoccupied by an insect genus, it was changed to Cryptaulaxoides. However, the latter was also preoccupied by a different insect genus. Consequently, it was eventually changed to its final name, Cryptaulaxella, in 2021.

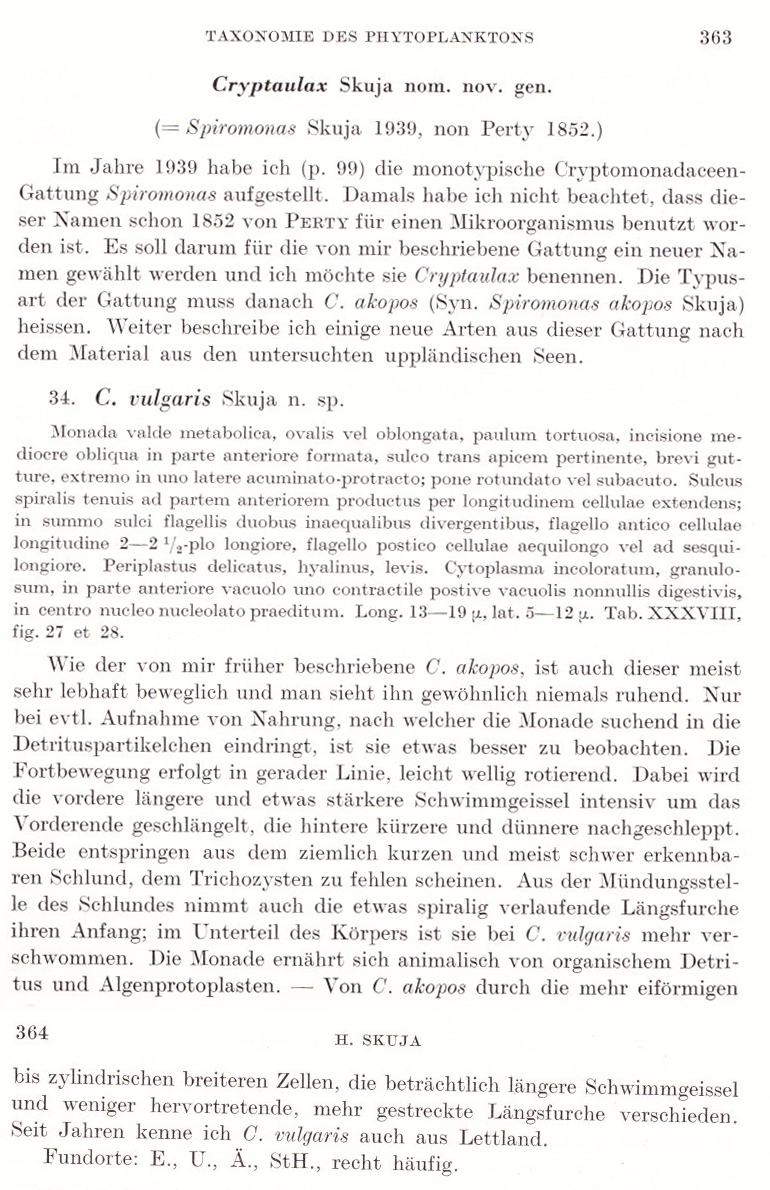
Original description of Cryptaulax by Skuja in his 1948 paper.

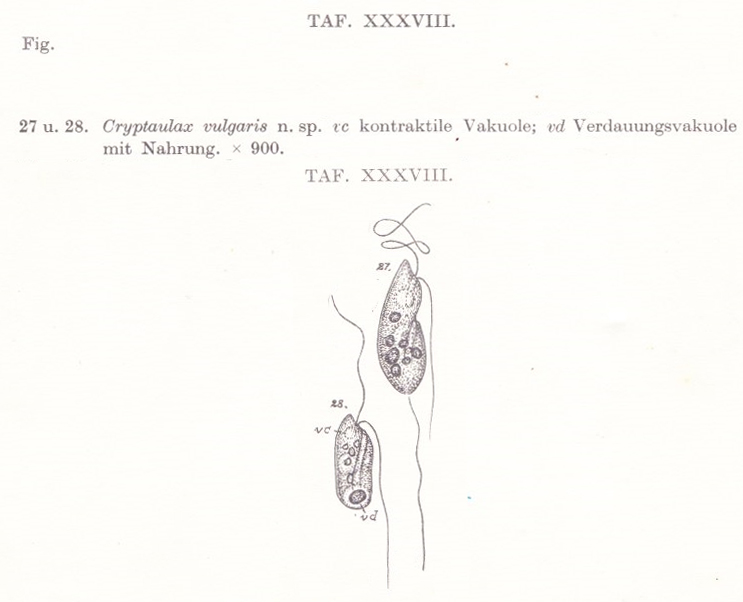
Skuja's drawings of Cryptaulax vulgaris from his 1948 publication

== Species ==
Cryptaulax akopos – Cryptaulax conoidea – Cryptaulax elegans – Cryptaulax formica – Cryptaulax longiciliatus – Cryptaulax marina – Cryptaulax taeniata – Cryptaulax vulgaris
