= S-adenosyl-L-methionine:N,N-dimethylglycine N-methyltransferase =

S-adenosyl-L-methionine:N,N-dimethylglycine N-methyltransferase may refer to:

- Sarcosine/dimethylglycine N-methyltransferase
- Dimethylglycine N-methyltransferase
