= Cyanonephron elegans =

Scientific classification
- Domain: Bacteria
- Kingdom: Bacillati
- Phylum: Cyanobacteriota
- Class: Cyanophyceae
- Order: Synechococcales
- Family: Synechococcaceae
- Genus: Cyanonephron
- Species: C. elegans

Binomial name
- Cyanonephron elegans Joosten, 2006

Species of Cyanobacteria

Cyanonephron elegans is a freshwater species of cyanobacteria in the family Synechococcaceae. It is described in the Netherlands, Canada, Siberia, Russia and Queensland, Australia.
