= Glycine/sarcosine N-methyltransferase =

Identifiers
- EC no.: 2.1.1.156
- CAS no.: 294210-82-5

Databases
- IntEnz: IntEnz view
- BRENDA: BRENDA entry
- ExPASy: NiceZyme view
- KEGG: KEGG entry
- MetaCyc: metabolic pathway
- PRIAM: profile
- PDB structures: RCSB PDB PDBe PDBsum
Search
- PMC: articles
- PubMed: articles
- NCBI: proteins

Glycine/sarcosine N-methyltransferase (EC 2.1.1.156, ApGSMT, glycine-sarcosine methyltransferase, GSMT, GMT, glycine sarcosine N-methyltransferase, S-adenosyl-L-methionine:sarcosine N-methyltransferase) is an enzyme with systematic name S-adenosyl-L-methionine:glycine(or sarcosine) N-methyltransferase (sarcosine(or N,N-dimethylglycine)-forming). It catalyses the following overall chemical reaction

glycine
+ 2 SAM
N,N-dimethylglycine
+ 2 SAH

The enzyme adds two methyl groups, with the intermediate, sarcosine, being methylated again to give the product N,N-dimethyl glycine. The methyl groups come from the cofactor, S-adenosyl methionine (SAM), which becomes S-adenosyl-L-homocysteine (SAH). The enzyme was characterised from the cyanobacterium, Aphanothece halophytica. N,N-dimethyl glycine is subsequently converted to betaine by the enzyme sarcosine/dimethylglycine N-methyltransferase.
