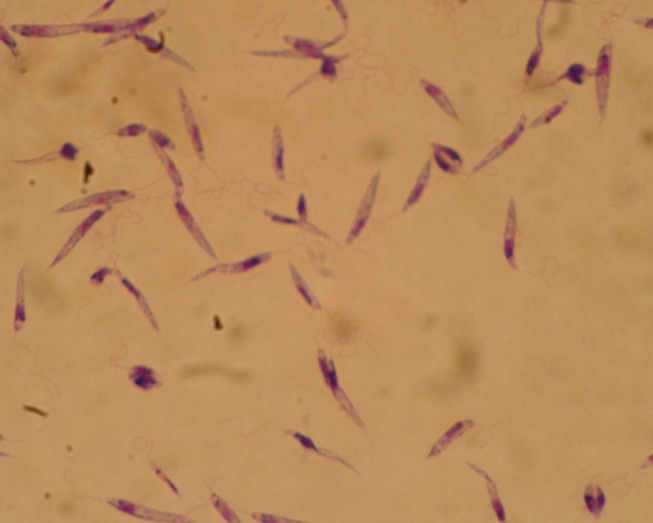
- Promastigotes of Leishmania major, 10×100, Giemsa stain.

Scientific classification
- Domain: Eukaryota
- (unranked): incertae sedis
- Class: Kinetoplastida
- Order: Trypanosomatida
- Family: Trypanosomatidae
- Genus: Leishmania
- Species: L. major

Binomial name
- Leishmania major Yakimoff and Schokhor, 1914

= Leishmania major =

Species of parasitic protist

Leishmania major is a species of parasite found in the genus Leishmania, and is associated with the disease zoonotic cutaneous leishmaniasis (also known as Aleppo boil, Baghdad boil, Bay sore, Biskra button, Chiclero ulcer, Delhi boil, Kandahar sore, Lahore sore, Oriental sore, Pian bois, and Uta). L. major is an intracellular pathogen which infects the macrophages and dendritic cells of the immune system. Though Leishmania species are found on every continent aside from Antarctica, Leishmania major is found only in the Eastern Hemisphere, specifically in Northern Africa, the Middle East, Northwestern China, and Northwestern India.

== Biology ==
=== Life cycle ===
As a trypanosomatid, L. major begins its lifecycle in amastigote form in the midgut of the main vector, female sand flies (Phlebotomus spp.). Once in the gut of the sand fly, the parasites change from aflagellate amastigotes into flagellated promastigotes for one to two weeks until they are fully developed, at which point they make their way to the proboscis.

Leishmania major Life Cycle

Upon biting a mammalian host, promastigotes are released into the bloodstream, where they are engulfed by macrophages. Following engulfment, promastigotes differentiate into amastigotes. Amastigotes are oval or round, and have a diameter between 2 and 3 μm. Additionally, they contain a large, eccentrically placed nucleus along with a kinetoplast (which holds abundant mitochondrial DNA of unique structure). Being equipped to survive the acidic environment inside the phagosomes of macrophages, the amastigotes reproduce through the process of binary fission. At this point the amastigotes are released throughout the body, and can be ingested by female sand flies, thus completing the cycle. L. major has a sexual cycle, including a meiotic process. Mating only occurs in the sand fly vector.

=== Hosts ===
Meriones unguiculatus, other Meriones and jirds, and other rodents are common hosts. Dogs, Mustela nivalis, Atelerix algirus, and Paraechinus aethiopicus are rare hosts. Mice are natural hosts. Transmission between mice is via Phlebotomus papatasi.

=== Infection ===
Upon entering the mammalian bloodstream, L. major meets the focal point of infection, the macrophage. As a result of two surface molecules, the protease gp63 and a lipophosphoglycan, promastigotes are able to bind to several macrophage receptors. Promastigote attachment to macrophages is facilitated by a number of receptors, including complement receptors CR1 and CR3, and the receptor for advanced glycosylation end products. Activation of complements occurs far from the cell membrane, and insertion of the membrane attack complex does not occur. This action is what allows the parasite to avoid being lysed, and to persist within the host's macrophages. In cattle Th1 and Th2 cells are an important part of the response. Neither cell type expresses exclusively IFNγ or IL-4 for L. major – Brown et al. 1998 find they express both in cattle. The bovine myeloid antimicrobial peptide BMAP-28 has leishmanicidal activity and may be usable in vivo in cattle infection. Lynn et al., 2011 obtain good results against two strains of the parasite, using two isoforms of BMAP-28, the retro-inverso and the D-amino acid.

=== Enzymatics ===
Dimethylallyltranstransferase is vital to L. major, making it an interesting target for leishmaniacidal substances. Propenko et al. 2014 present and validate several dimethylallyltranstransferase inhibitors.

== Epidemiology ==
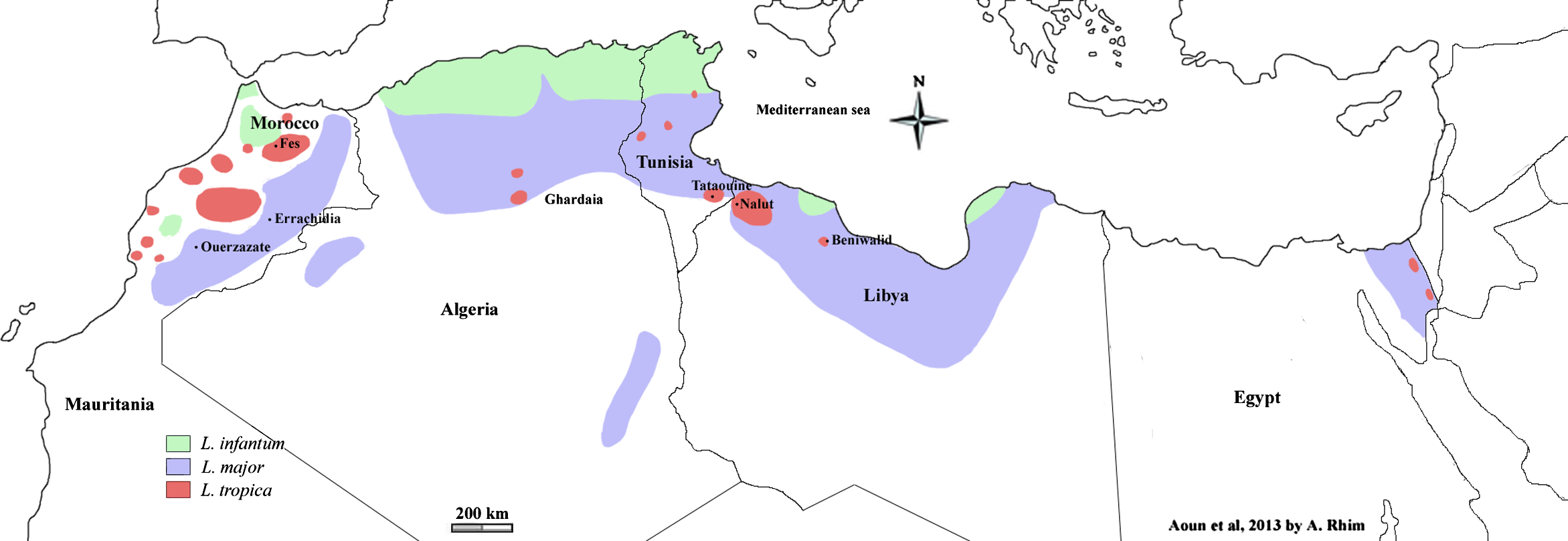
Cutaneous leishmaniasis in North Africa; Leishmania major infected areas are in blue

The incidence rate of cutaneous leishmaniasis is estimated to be between 1 and 1.5 million cases a year. However, transmission does not often occur in utero, during blood transfusions, or through interpersonal contact. Thus, the main form of transmission is through the sand fly vector. Sand flies do not fly long distances, and tend to complete their life cycles in areas with a diameter of less than 1 km. Furthermore, because of the propensity of sand flies to seek out shelter in the burrows of small rodents, where L. major is endemic, small mammals such as gerbils and birds serve as the main reservoirs. Dogs have also been documented as contracting cutaneous leishmaniasis in Egypt and Saudi Arabia. This is rare however, and dogs are not important hosts for L. major.

L. major and its cousin, L. tropica, are recognized as causing the majority of cases of cutaneous leishmaniasis across the Middle East, Northern Africa, and some areas of China and India (as mentioned above). Between 2002 and 2004, over 700 cases of the disease were reported among United States military personnel serving in Iraq.

== Clinical manifestations ==
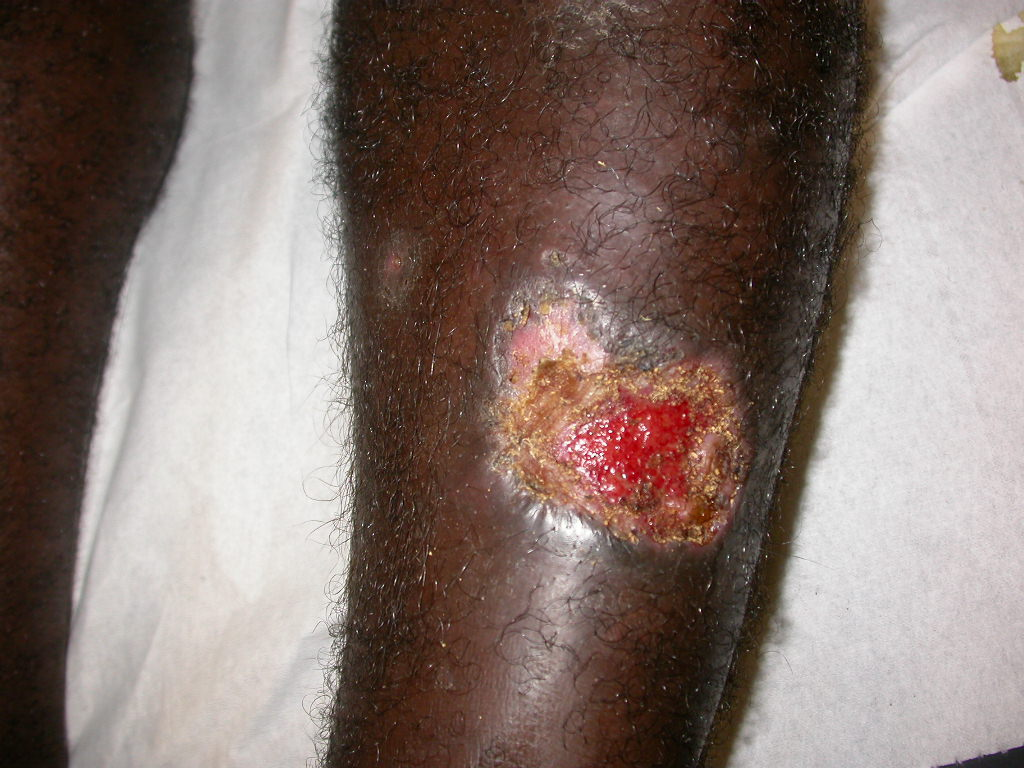
Cutaneous Leishmaniasis Sore

Upon becoming infected, patients usually present with lesions at the site of the sand fly bite. The infection is acute, and usually has a duration of about 3–6 months. As more and more phagocytic cells engulf promastigotes, prompting the production of amastigotes, nodules form on the skin. These nodules then ulcerate, although due to the variable characteristics of the lesions, species specific identification of the pathogen is impossible. Generally though, lesions appear moist and have raised outer borders, a granulating base, an overlying layer of white purulent exudate, and have been described as "pizza-like." Biopsies of these lesions usually reveal a number of findings including numerous macrophages containing intracellular amastigotes as well as lymphocytes with observed granuloma formation and few parasites.

== Diagnosis ==
Leishmania major should be considered in the differential diagnosis of chronic lesions of people who have spent time in areas where it is endemic. However, other pathogens can cause similar lesions and therefore paracoccidiodomycosis, histoplasmosis, sporotrichosis, lobomycosis, lupus vulgaris, Mycobacterium ulcerans, syphilis, cutaneous sarcoidosis, and leprosy should all be considered as well.

The most common ways of diagnosing leishmaniasis are to identify amastigotes in a Wright-Giemsa-stained touch preparation or through isolation of the parasites in cultures.

== Treatment ==
Because the host's immune system tends to resolve infection after 3–6 months, treatment of the lesions generally focuses on limiting tissue damage and necrosis. A number of different treatments have yielded results of varying effectiveness in the treatment of L. major caused cutaneous leishmaniasis.

- Fluconazole given in 200 mg doses over the course of 6 weeks resulted in 90% cure rate versus 60% in those given a placebo.
- Topical application of 15% paromomycin and 12% methylbenzethonium has been used successfully to treat patients in Israel.
- Intralesional injections of 0.5–2.0 mL of 100 mg/ML antimony has also been shown to be effective when injected around the sides of lesions. When 10 such injections were given to patients in Egypt, 85% were cured within 3 months.

== Prevention ==
The spread of leishmaniasis can be prevented by interrupting the sand fly life cycle or removing or treating pathogen reservoirs. Avoiding sand fly bites is an effective means of avoiding disease for short term visitors to areas where L. major is endemic. This can be accomplished through the use of DEET containing insect repellent, application of insecticides to clothes and bedding, as well as using mosquito nets to cover beds. Sand flies usually bite between dusk and dawn, so preventative measures should be taken during these times.

Though a vaccine does not yet exist that can prevent cutaneous leishmaniasis, it is speculated that one will be developed in the near future. Patients who have recovered from L. major infections develop high- level immunity to the pathogen. In Russia and Israel, soldiers were "immunized" against L. major through the injection of live promastigotes into the buttocks; however, this form of treatment was discontinued in Israel due to the occasional formation of large or slow-healing lesions.
