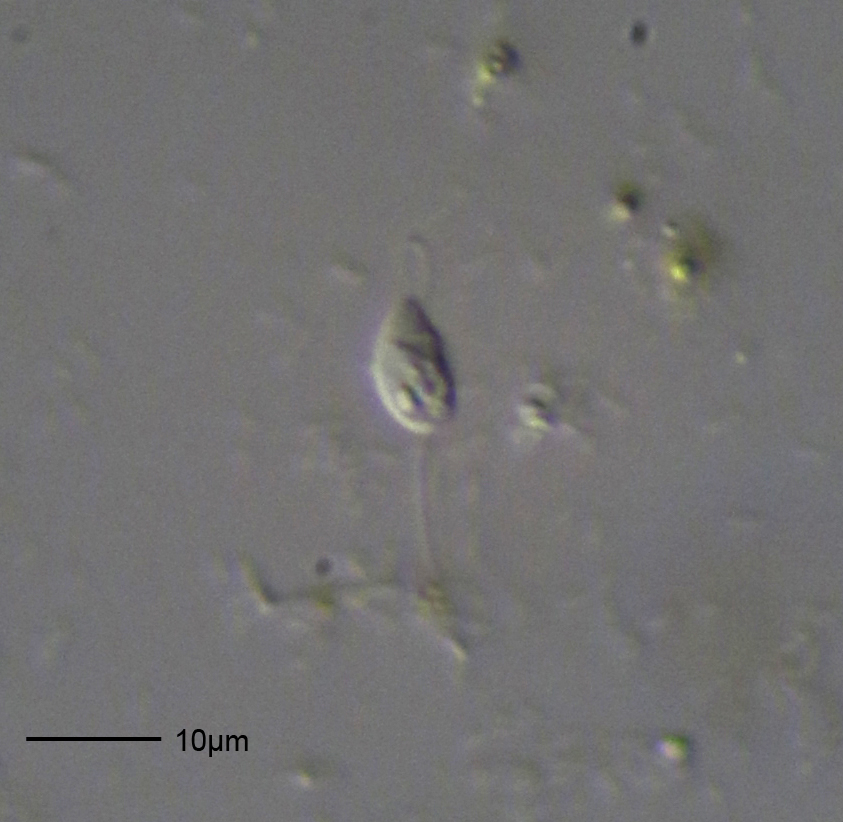
- Bodo saltans

Scientific classification
- Domain: Eukaryota
- Supergroup: Discoba
- Phylum: Euglenozoa
- Class: Kinetoplastea
- Subclass: Metakinetoplastina
- Order: Bodonida; Hollande, 1952 emend. Vickerman, 1976, Krylov et al., 1980

Suborders
- Eubodonina; Neobodonina; Parabodonina

= Bodonida =

Proposed order of microorganisms

Bodonida is a proposed order of kinetoplastid flagellate excavates. It contains the genera Bodo and Rhynchomonas, relatives to the parasitic trypanosomes. This order also contains the colonial genus Cephalothamnium.

== Taxonomy ==
Bodonida contains the following suborders and families:

- Eubodonina Vickerman in Moreira et al., 2004 stat. n. Cavalier-Smith, 2016
  - Bodonidae Bütschli, 1883 emend. Cavalier-Smith, 2016
- Neobodonina Vickerman in Moreira et al., 2004 stat. n. Cavalier-Smith, 2016
  - Neobodonidae Cavalier-Smith, 2016
  - Rhynchomonadidae Cavalier-Smith, 2016
- Parabodonina Vickerman in Moreira et al., 2004 stat. n. Cavalier-Smith, 2016
  - Cryptobiidae Vickerman, 1976
  - Parabodonidae Cavalier-Smith 2016

The order is probably paraphyletic and some treatments raise the three suborders to orders.
