= Lemmermanniella =

Scientific classification
- Domain: Bacteria
- Phylum: Cyanobacteria
- Class: Cyanophyceae
- Order: Synechococcales
- Family: Synechococcaceae
- Genus: Lemmermanniella; L.Geitler, 1942

Genus of bacteria

Lemmermanniella is a genus of cyanobacteria belonging to the family Synechococcaceae.

The genus name of Lemmermanniella is in honour of Ernst Johann Lemmermann (1867-1915), who was a German botanist.

The genus was circumscribed by Lothar Geitler in Nat. Pflanzenfam. (Engler & Prantl) ed.2, vol.1b on page 62 in 1942.

Species:

- Lemmermanniella flexa Hindák
- Lemmermanniella gracillima Skvortsov
- Lemmermanniella obesa M.T.P.Azevedo, C.A.Souza & M.Menezes
- Lemmermanniella pallida (Lemmermann) Geitler
- Lemmermanniella parva Hindák
- Lemmermanniella terrestris Gama Jr.
- Lemmermanniella uliginosa Komárek & Komárek-Legnerová
