= Cyanonephron =

Scientific classification
- Domain: Bacteria
- Phylum: Cyanobacteria
- Class: Cyanophyceae
- Order: Synechococcales
- Family: Synechococcaceae
- Genus: Cyanonephron; B.Hickel 1985

Species
- Cyanonephron elegans Joosten, 2006; Cyanonephron styloides B.Hickel, 1985

Genus of bacteria

Cyanonephron is a genus of cyanobacteria in the family Synechococcaceae.
