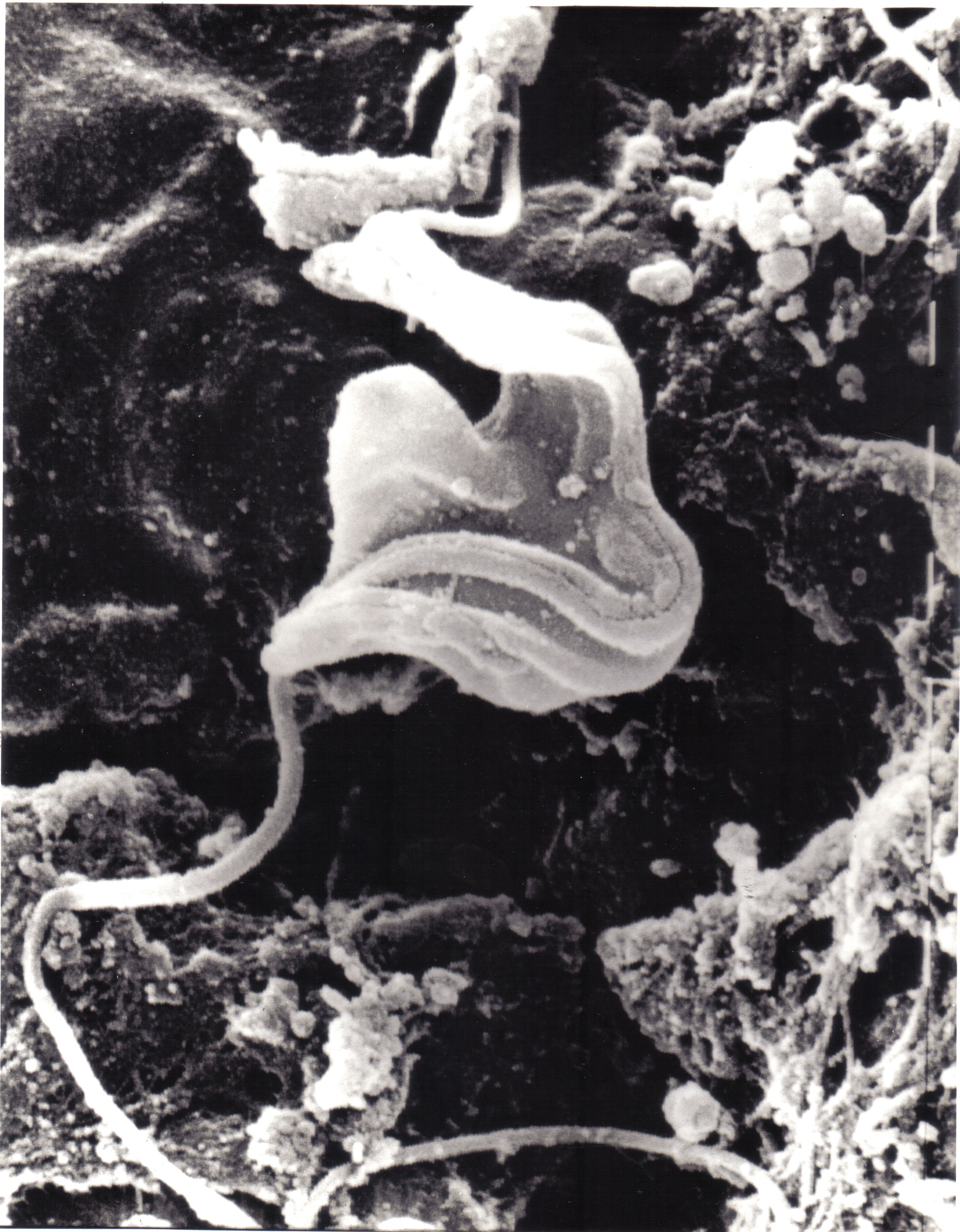
- Cryptobia helicis

Scientific classification
- Domain: Eukaryota
- Clade: Discoba
- Phylum: Euglenozoa
- Class: Kinetoplastea
- Order: Parabodonida
- Family: Cryptobiidae
- Genus: Cryptobia

Species
- Many, see text

= Cryptobia =

Genus of protists

Cryptobia is a genus of kinetoplastids. Several species are known for being fish pathogens. They can be found in other animals, as well. The name Trypanoplasma is occasionally used for some of these.

== Biology ==
There are 52 species of Cryptobia known from fish. 40 of these live in the blood, 7 in the gut, and 5 on the body surface.

Examples include:

- Cryptobia branchialis, an ectoparasite that lives on the skin or gills. It can deform the skin and cause anorexia and death.
- Cryptobia iubilans, an endoparasite that lives in the intestines and causes granulomatous inflammation of the abdominal organs, resulting in weight loss and death.
- Cryptobia salmositica, C. borreli, and C. bullocki, blood parasites that lead to anaemia and lesions in the haematopoietic tissues.

Some Cryptobia parasitize other animal taxa. Examples include:

- Cryptobia innominata, a parasite of the snail Triodopsis tridentata.

Being kinetoplastids, the mitochondria of Cryptobia contain DNA minicircles that are involved in gene editing of their mitochondrial RNA. However, unlike trypanosomes, their minicircles are not linked in a kinetoplast network. The minicircles of C. helicis is in the form of "pan-kinetoplast DNA" and are distributed throughout the mitochondrion, and are supercoiled unlike most kinetoplast DNA. The fish parasite Trypanoplasma borreli has a large kinetoplast DNA structure that contains several minicircle sequences repeating in a single large chromosome.

== Diagnosis and treatment ==
In fish, the disease is most important in salmonids. Marine and freshwater fish can be infected. These protozoans can be found on most continents.

Bloodfeeding leeches are implicated in the transmission of the bloodborne species.

The protozoans can be identified in skin and gill biopsies and blood samples. For some of the protozoans, antibodies can be detected in the fish using ELISA and fluorescent antibody testing.

Chemical treatment with isometamidium chloride has been effective. There is a vaccine against C. salmositica which lasts up to 2 years.

== Taxonomy ==
Species include:

- Cryptobia bialata
- Cryptobia borreli
- Cryptobia branchialis
- Cryptobia bullocki
- Cryptobia carinariae
- Cryptobia geccorum
- Cryptobia helicis
- Cryptobia innominata
- Cryptobia iubilans
- Cryptobia salmositica
