= Cyanodictyon =

Scientific classification
- Domain: Bacteria
- Phylum: Cyanobacteria
- Class: Cyanophyceae
- Order: Synechococcales
- Family: Synechococcaceae
- Genus: Cyanodictyon; Pascher, 1914

Genus of bacteria

Cyanodictyon is a genus of cyanobacteria belonging to the family Synechococcaceae.

The species of this genus are found in Europe.

Species:

- Cyanodictyon balticum Cronberg
- Cyanodictyon endophyticum Pascher
- Cyanodictyon filiforme Komárk.-Legn. & Cronberg
- Cyanodictyon iac Cronberg & Komárek
- Cyanodictyon planctonicum B.A.Mayer
- Cyanodictyon planctonicum Barbara Meyer
- Cyanodictyon reticulatum (Lemmerm.) Geitler
- Cyanodictyon tropicalis Senna et al.
- Cyanodictyon tubiforme Cronberg
