= Dimethylglycine N-methyltransferase =

Identifiers
- EC no.: 2.1.1.161

Databases
- IntEnz: IntEnz view
- BRENDA: BRENDA entry
- ExPASy: NiceZyme view
- KEGG: KEGG entry
- MetaCyc: metabolic pathway
- PRIAM: profile
- PDB structures: RCSB PDB PDBe PDBsum
Search
- PMC: articles
- PubMed: articles
- NCBI: proteins

Dimethylglycine N-methyltransferase (EC 2.1.1.161, BsmB, DMT) is an enzyme with systematic name S-adenosyl-L-methionine:N,N-dimethylglycine N-methyltransferase (betaine-forming). This enzyme catalyses the following chemical reaction

dimethylglycine
+ SAM
trimethylglycine
+ SAH

The enzyme adds a methyl group to N.N-dimethylglycine, giving the product betaine, trimethylglycine. The methyl group comes from the cofactor, S-adenosyl methionine (SAM), which becomes S-adenosyl-L-homocysteine (SAH). The enzyme was characterised from the cyanobacterium, Synechococcus sp. WH8102. Unlike the related enzyme, sarcosine/dimethylglycine N-methyltransferase, sarcosine is not a substrate.
