= Anathece =

Scientific classification
- Domain: Bacteria
- Phylum: Cyanobacteria
- Class: Cyanophyceae
- Order: Synechococcales
- Family: Synechococcaceae
- Genus: Anathece (Komárek & Anagnostidis) Komárek, Kastovsky & Jezberová

Genus of cyanobacteria

Anathece is a genus of cyanobacteria belonging to the family Synechococcaceae.

The genus was first described by Komárek and Anagnostidis in 2011 as Aphanothece subgenus Anathece.

The genus has cosmopolitan distribution.

Species:

- Anathece bachmannii
- Anathece clathrata
- Anathece minutissima
- Anathece smithii
