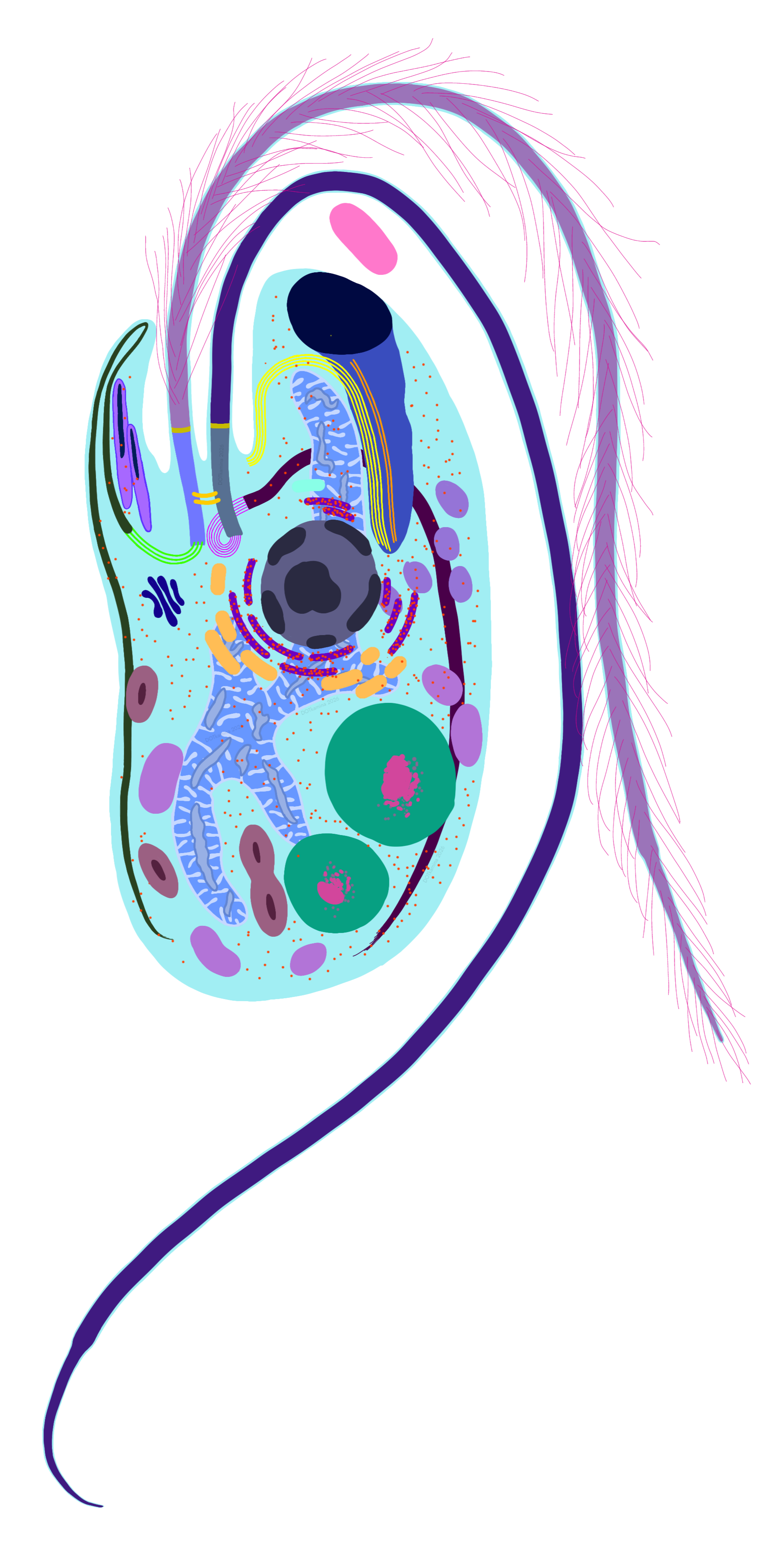
- Klosteria

Scientific classification
- Domain: Eukaryota
- Clade: Discoba
- Phylum: Euglenozoa
- Class: Kinetoplastea
- Order: Neobodonida
- Suborder: Neobodonina
- Family: Neobodonidae; Cavalier-Smith 2016

Genera
- Actuariola; Avlakibodo; Azumiobodo; Cruzella; Cryptaulaxella; Klosteria; Neobodo; Rhynchobodo

= Neobodonidae =

Family of single-celled organisms

Neobodonidae are free-living biflagellate kinetoplastids with an apical cytostome and a curved, longitudinal cytopharynx that occupies half to two-thirds of the cell's length. The cytostome is supported by five or more microtubules, which fold from the flagellar pocket. The cytostome may have a labium, a small cellular extension. The cytopharynx has an MTR (microtubular reinforced) band. The posterior flagellum is trailed behind when the organism swims. Neobodonids of the family Neobodonidae feed by phagocytosis, ingesting bacteria or other eukaryotes.
