= Carl Apstein =

German zoologist and botanist

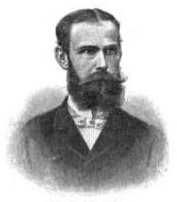
Carl Apstein

Carl Heinrich Apstein (19 September 1862, Stettin – 14 November 1950, Berlin) was a German zoologist (over a wide variety of animal life) and botanist (with a focus on phytoplankton and algae). The standard author abbreviation Apstein is used to indicate this person as the author when citing a botanical name.

In 1889 he earned his doctorate from the University of Kiel with a dissertation on the spinnerets of the orb-weaver spider. Afterwards, he worked as an assistant to Karl Brandt (1854–1931) at the zoological institute in Kiel. As a young man he carried out studies of freshwater plankton in Holstein lakes (1890–95). In May 1898 he obtained his habilitation at Kiel for zoology and comparative anatomy, and a few months later took part as a zoologist in the Deutschen Tiefsee-Expedition (German Deep Sea Expedition) aboard the steamship "Valdivia".

In 1906 he was appointed associate professor in Kiel, and in 1911 became a scientific officer at the Preußischen Akademie der Wissenschaften in Berlin. In this position he worked as a publisher of scientific journals in the field of zoology, which included editorship of Das Tierreich ("The Animal Kingdom"; from 1927). He was a member of the International Commission on Zoological Nomenclature, and from 1918 to 1945 was secretary of the Deutschen Zoologischen Gesellschaft (German Zoological Society).

In addition to his research involving the 1898–99 Deutschen Tiefsee-Expedition, he was tasked with processing material taken from the Plankton-Expedition (1889) and the Deutschen Südpolar-Expedition (1901–03). In his investigations, Apstein distinguished himself in research of Thaliacea.

== Written works ==
- Bau und Function der Spinndrüsen der Araneida, 1889 – Structure and function of the spinnerets of Araneida, dissertation.
- Das Süsswasserplankton: Methode und Resultate der quantitativen Untersuchung, 1896 – On freshwater plankton.
- Tierleben der Hochsee: Reisebegleiter für Seefahrer. Lipsius und Tischer, Kiel 1905.
- Die Thaliacea der Plankton-Expedition. B. Vertheilung der Salpen. (= Victor Hensen editor): Ergebnisse der Plankton-Expedition der Humboldt-Stiftung, Bd. 2), 1894, S. 1–68. – Thaliacea of the "Plankton Expedition".
- Die Salpen der Deutschen Tiefsee-Expedition. (= Carl Chun editor): Wissenschaftliche Ergebnisse der Deutschen Tiefsee-Expedition auf dem Dampfer "Valdivia" 1898–1899, Bd. 12), Fischer, Jena 1906, S. 245–290. – Thaliacea of the German "deep-sea expedition".
- Die Salpen der Deutschen Südpolar-Expedition. (= Erich von Drygalski editor): Deutsche Südpolar-Expedition 1901–1903, Bd. 9), 1906, S. 155–203. – Thaliacea of the German "South Polar expedition".
- Nordisches Plankton (eight volumes). Lipsius und Tischer, Kiel und Leipzig 1901–1942. (edited with Karl Brandt) – Nordic plankton.
