= Karl Brandt (zoologist) =

German zoologist and marine biologist

Andreas Heinrich Karl Brandt (23 May 1854, Schönebeck near Magdeburg – 7 January 1931, Kiel) was a German zoologist and marine biologist.

He studied natural sciences in Berlin, receiving his doctorate in 1877 at the University of Halle. Following graduation he served as an assistant to Emil Du Bois-Reymond (1818–1896) at the physiological institute of the University of Berlin. From 1882 to 1885 he worked at the zoological station in Naples, and in 1885 obtained his habilitation from the University of Königsberg under the direction of Carl Chun (1852–1914).

From 1888 he was a professor of zoology at the University of Kiel, where he also served as director of the zoological institute and museum. Additionally, from 1887 to 1913 he taught classes at the German Imperial Naval Academy. In 1922 Brandt became professor emeritus, and in 1924 was appointed chairman of the Preußischen wissenschaftlichen Kommission zur Untersuchung der deutschen Meere (Prussian Scientific Commission for the Investigation of German seas).

He is known for his research on the role that dissolved nitrogen and phosphorus compounds play upon oceanic life. He also made contributions in his morphological and systematic studies of radiolarians and tintinnids. In 1889 he participated in the Plankton-Expedition under the direction of Victor Hensen (1835–1924). From the expedition Brandt introduced new ideas about adaptation and propagation in regards to deep-sea life.

== Writings ==
- Über die biologischen Untersuchungen der Plankton-Expedition. In: Naturwissenschaftliche Rundschau 5, 1890. – On biological studies of the "Plankton Expedition".
- Der Stoffhaushalt im Meere. Schweizerbart, Stuttgart 1933, (Handbuch der Seefischerei Nordeuropas, Volume 1, Issue 6) 112–114, with Johannes Reibisch (1868– ).
- Nordisches Plankton, eight volumes, Lipsius und Tischer, Kiel und Leipzig 1901–1942, (Brandt and Carl Apstein as editors) – Nordic plankton.
