= Sarcosine/dimethylglycine N-methyltransferase =

Identifiers
- EC no.: 2.1.1.157

Databases
- IntEnz: IntEnz view
- BRENDA: BRENDA entry
- ExPASy: NiceZyme view
- KEGG: KEGG entry
- MetaCyc: metabolic pathway
- PRIAM: profile
- PDB structures: RCSB PDB PDBe PDBsum
Search
- PMC: articles
- PubMed: articles
- NCBI: proteins

Sarcosine/dimethylglycine N-methyltransferase (EC 2.1.1.157, ApDMT, sarcosine-dimethylglycine methyltransferase, SDMT, sarcosine dimethylglycine N-methyltransferase, S-adenosyl-L-methionine:N,N-dimethylglycine N-methyltransferase) is an enzyme with systematic name S-adenosyl-L-methionine:sarcosine(or N,N-dimethylglycine) N-methyltransferase (N,N-dimethylglycine(or betaine)-forming). It catalyses the following overll chemical reaction

sarcosine
+ 2 SAM
trimethylglycine
+ 2 SAH

The enzyme adds two methyl groups, with the intermediate, N.N-dimethylglycine, being methylated again to give the product betaine, trimethylglycine. The methyl groups come from the cofactor, S-adenosyl methionine (SAM), which becomes S-adenosyl-L-homocysteine (SAH). The enzyme was characterised from the cyanobacterium, Aphanothece halophytica. In this organism, glycine is converted to sarcosine by the enzyme glycine/sarcosine N-methyltransferase.
