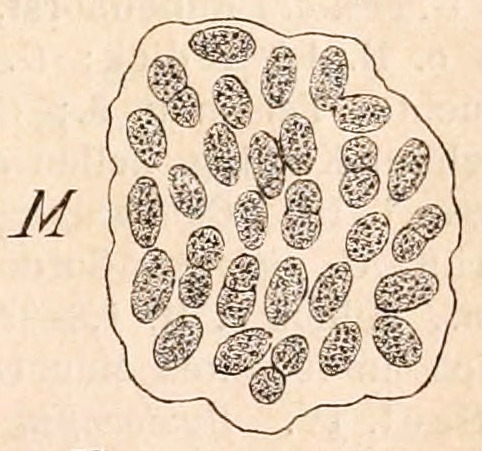
- Aphanothece castagnei Rbh.

Scientific classification
- Domain: Bacteria
- Phylum: Cyanobacteria
- Class: Cyanophyceae
- Order: Chroococcales
- Family: Aphanothecaceae
- Genus: Aphanothece; C.Nägeli, 1849

= Aphanothece =

Genus of bacteria

Aphanothece is a polyphyletic genus with 63 accepted species. The name is derived from the Greek words, ‘aphanes’ and ‘theke’ which mean “invisible" and “box or sheath” respectively. This genera is cosmopolitan, found in soils, thermal springs and other benthic, freshwater, marine, hypersaline, and moist terrestrial environments. Morphology can vary, with both microscopic and macroscopic colonies large enough to be collected and preserved in herbarium records.

== Morphology ==
The formerly combined genera Aphanothece and Anathece can be differentiated by the size of cells, ecology and colony morphology. Anathece rarely forms colonies large enough to see and has much smaller cells, while Aphanothece can have colonies several cm in diameter and tends to have larger cells. Aphanothece species occupy a broader range of microhabitats that can be planktonic, subaerophytic, metaphytic, epipelic, or benthic. While benthic Anathece have been reported, they are typically planktonic. Anathece colonies are less defined and colorless, Aphanothece colonies and mucilage can be found in shades of green, grey, blue, brown and yellow.

== Ecology and Habitat ==
Aphanothece species live in freshwater ponds, lakes and coastal brackish environments. Some species are able to live in extremely thermophilic environments such as hot water springs. Aphanothece species also live in soil and on wet rocks, these species form sediments on the marine coasts.

In oil industry waste water, 40 species of algae including Aphanothece were observed to be growing in this environment by using organic molecules as nutrients in the summer and winter months.

== Taxonomy ==
Aphanothece is a genus of cyanobacteria with complex taxonomy. Previously, the genus was only delineated morphologically since it was first described by Carl Nägeli in 1849, with Aphanothece microscopica Nägeli as the type species. By some accounts the genus has 29 accepted species, but work on the taxa since the 1990s reassigned species and divided the genus into three subgenera based on morphological and molecular methods: Aphanothece, Anathece and Cyanogastrum, which were later separated into their own genera.

In the most recent work on the classification of cyanobacteria orders and families, Anathece was moved to the Prochlorococcaceae family as its own genus. A formal review of every species in the taxa has not been conducted, as such a list of the 63 taxonomically accepted species in the AlgaeBase database are as follows, but are likely to change as more research is conducted.

=== Species ===
Anacystis thermalis J.J.Copeland

Aphanothece atrocrustacea Skuja

Aphanothece bacilloidea N.L.Gardner

Aphanothece biceps Skuja

Aphanothece botryosa Obuchova

Aphanothece bullosa (Meneghini) Rabenhorst

Aphanothece cancellata Zalessky

Aphanothece castagnei (Kützing) Rabenhorst

Aphanothece coacervata N.M.Lemes-da-Silva, L.H.Zanini-Branco & O.Necchi Jr.

Aphanothece coerulescens A.Braun

Aphanothece cohenii Campbell & Golubic

Aphanothece comasii J.Komárková-Legnerová & R.Tavera

Aphanothece conferta P.Richter

Aphanothece conglomerata F.Rich

Aphanothece cretaria Frémy

Aphanothece curvata Lagerheim

Aphanothece cylindracea (N.L.Gardner) Komárek & Anagnostidis

Aphanothece densa N.M.Lemes da Silva, L.H.Zanini Branco & O.Necchi Jr.

Aphanothece desikacharyi Hindák

Aphanothece distans Zalessky

Aphanothece elabens (Meneghini) Elenkin

Aphanothece excentrica N.M.Lemes da Silva, L.H.Zanini Branco & O.Necchi Jr.

Aphanothece floccosa (Zalessky) Cronberg & Komárek

Aphanothece gardneri G.De Toni

Aphanothece goetzei Schmidle

Aphanothece granulosa (N.L.Gardner) Komárek & Komákova-Legnerová

Aphanothece halophytica Frémy

Aphanothece hardersii Schiller

Aphanothece hegewaldii Kovácik

Aphanothece heterospora Rabenhorst

Aphanothece karukerae Lami

Aphanothece krumbeinii Campbell & Golubic

Aphanothece lemnae H.-J.Chu

Aphanothece longior Naumann

Aphanothece margaritacea (Kützing) Forti

Aphanothece marina (Ercegovic) Komárek & Anagnostidis

Aphanothece maritima J.R.Johansen & Flechtner

Aphanothece microscopica Nägeli

Aphanothece microspora (Meneghini) Rabenhorst

Aphanothece minor Frémy

Aphanothece naegelii Wartmann

Aphanothece nebulosa Skuja

Aphanothece nidulans P.Richter

Aphanothece nostocopsis Skuja

Aphanothece opalescens N.L.Gardner

Aphanothece pallida (Kützing) Rabenhorst

Aphanothece paralleliformis Cronberg

Aphanothece protohydrae Häyrén

Aphanothece pseudoglebulenta Joosten

Aphanothece rubra Liebetanz

Aphanothece sacrum (Suringar) Okada

Aphanothece salina Elenkin & A.N.Danilov

Aphanothece saxicola Nägeli

Aphanothece stagnina (Sprengel) A.Braun

Aphanothece subsalina Komárek et Komárková-Legnerová

Aphanothece thermicola Hindák

Aphanothece trentepohlii Grunow

Aphanothece uliginosa W.R.Taylor

Aphanothece utahensis Tilden

Aphanothece vaginata N.M.Lemes da Silva, L.H.Zanini Branco & O.Necchi Jr.

Aphanothece variabilis (J.Schiller) Komárek

Aphanothece zulanirae Werner & Sant'Anna
