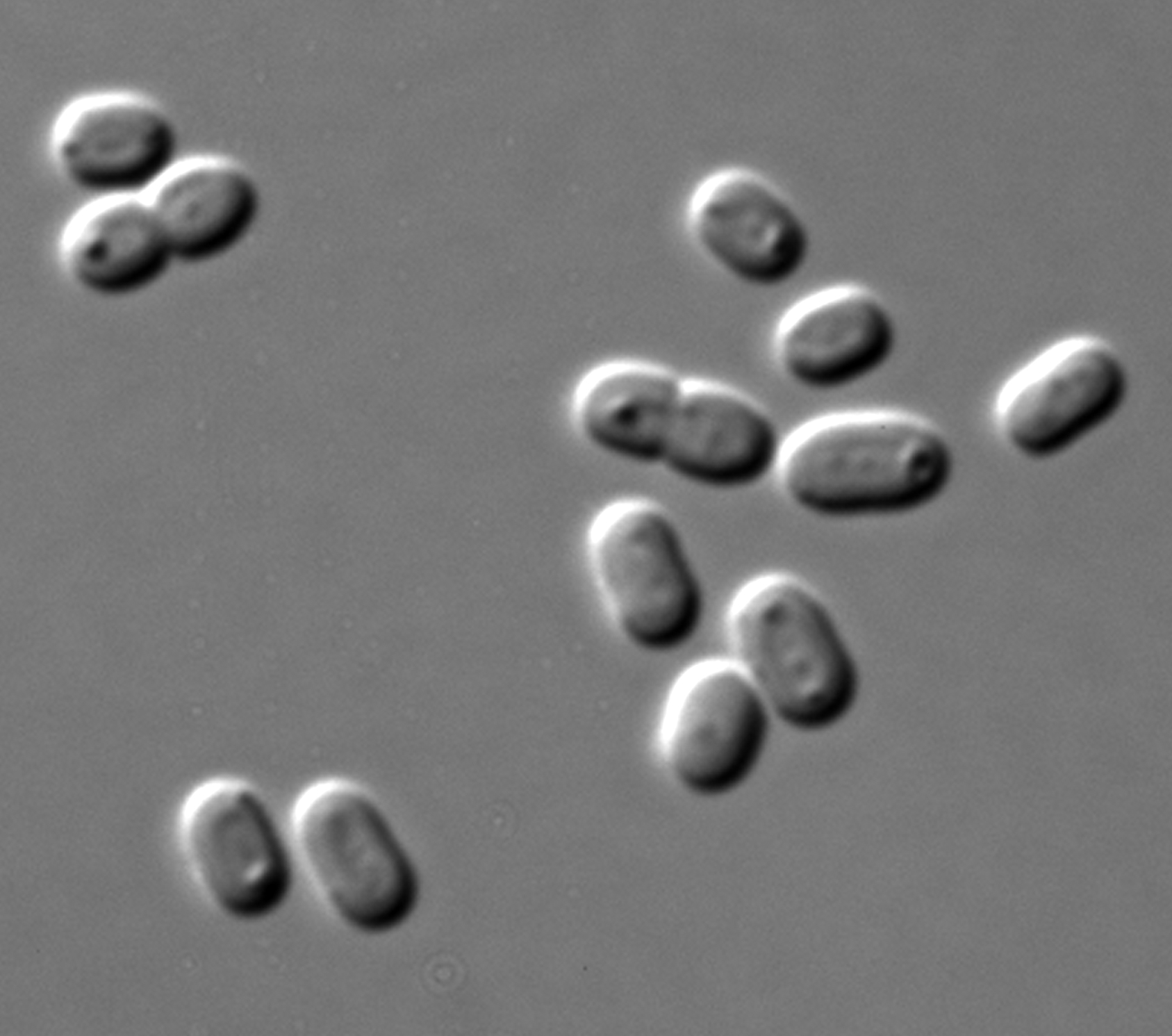
- Synechococcus

Scientific classification
- Domain: Bacteria
- Phylum: Cyanobacteria
- Class: Cyanophyceae
- Order: Synechococcales
- Family: Synechococcaceae; Komárek & Anagnostidis

Genera
- Anathece Komárek et al. 2011; Bacularia Borzì 1905; Cyanobium Rippka & Cohen-Bazire 1983; Cyanocatena Hindák 1975; Cyanodictyon Pascher 1914; Cyanogranis Hindák 1982; Cyanonephron Hickel 1985; Cyanothamnos Cronberg 1991; Epigloeosphaera Komárková 1991; Lemmermanniella Geitler 1942; Lithococcus Ercegović 1925; Lithomyxa Howe 1931; Rhabdoderma Schmidle & Lauterborn 1900; Rhabdogloea Schröder 1917; Rhodostichus Geitler & Pascher 1931; Synechococcus Nägeli 1849; Thermosynechococcus Katoh et al. 2001

= Synechococcaceae =

Family of bacteria

The Synechococcaceae are a family of cyanobacteria.
