= Keith Vickerman =

British zoologist

Keith Vickerman FRS FRSE FMedSci
- Born: 21 March 1933; Huddersfield, Yorkshire
- Died: 28 June 2016 (aged 83)
- Spouse: Moira Dutton
- Awards: Fellow of the Royal Society; Fellow of the Royal Society of Edinburgh; Fellow of the Academy of Medical Sciences; Linnean Medal (1906)

Academic background
- Education: University of Glasgow

Academic work
- Main interests: Natural history, Zoology, Parasitology

Keith Vickerman was a British zoologist born in Huddersfield, Yorkshire. He was Regius Professor of Zoology in the University of Glasgow, 1984–98. He was awarded the Linnean Medal in 1996. A Fellow of the Academy of Medical Sciences, he was one of the organization's founding members.

Vickerman was the one who made the discovery that antigenic variation could occur in eukaryotic cells, namely in protozoa.
