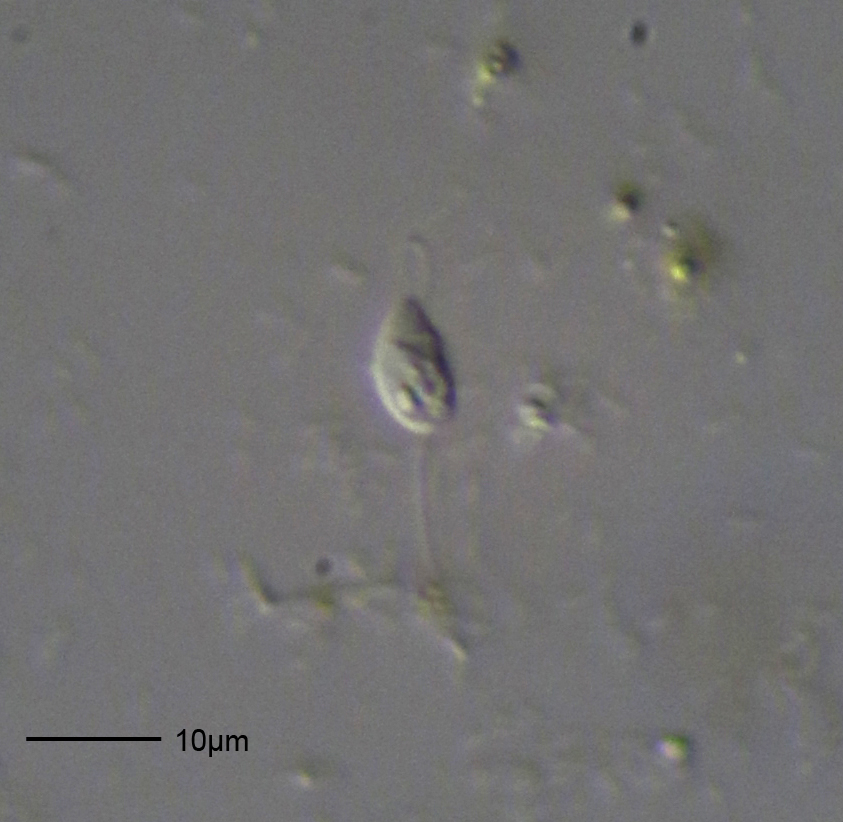
- Bodo saltans

Scientific classification
- Domain: Eukaryota
- Supergroup: Discoba
- Phylum: Euglenozoa
- Class: Kinetoplastea
- Subclass: Metakinetoplastina
- Order: Eubodonida
- Family: Bodonidae; Bütschli, 1883
- Genus: Bodo; Ehrenberg, 1830

Type species
- Bodo saltans Ehrenberg, 1830

= Bodo (genus) =

Genus of micro-organisms

Bodo (/ˈboʊdoʊ/) is a genus of microscopic kinetoplastids, flagellate excavates first described in 1831 by Christian Gottfried Ehrenberg. The genus contains four species. Bodo includes free-living, phagotrophic organisms that can be found in many marine and freshwater environments as well as some terrestrial environments. Being phagotrophic, Bodo feeds on bacteria and other microorganisms that it finds while swimming through its water-based habitats. The swimming-like movement is facilitated by the two unequal flagella that Bodo possesses which arise from an anteriorly located flagellar pocket. Bodo is roughly bean-shaped and is often missed in samples from water or terrestrial environments due to its small size.

== History ==
The genus was originally described in 1831 by Christian Gottfried Ehrenberg as having an ovoid body, a very short tail, transparent and able to show the colour of the food that it ingests. Ehrenberg also described the type species, Bodo saltans, as being green, but this was later refuted as it was discovered that the green colouration came from the photosynthetic bacteria that it ingests. In 1988, it was found that Bodo is a phagotroph that feed on bacteria of many kinds, some bacteria are more appealing than others. In 2002, Simpson et al. subdivided the bodonids, which led to the shrinking of the genus Bodo as most of its species were transferred into other genera. Bodo was placed into a new order, Eubodonida. During this switch, the original 149 species were reduced to four. Since 2002, 11 new species have been added to the genus, but nine of those are seen as controversial. After 130 years, Bodo has been refined and now is the only genus in the family Bodonidae, making it a homogeneous grouping. However, as more studying is done on the species, more changes are likely to arise. Even after the use of multiple gene analysis, there are still arguments over the placement of certain species in the genus.

== Habitat and ecological importance ==
In nature, Bodo is found in marine or fresh water and in terrestrial environments that have high levels of moisture, for example dung. Bodo sits close to the bottom of the food net of which it is a part. As phagotrophs, Bodo feed on bacteria by ingestion which can cause a change in the organisms colour as Bodo is transparent. Often the bacteria are phototrophic, which means that Bodo are part of the second layer of food nets as they lack the ability to produce their own energy. Several members of the genus Bodo are afflicted by a giant virus known as the Bodo saltans virus (BsV), the most abundant giant viruses in the ocean. Different strains of the virus are only able to infect either specific species, or in the case of Bodo saltans, even particular strains of the heterogeneous taxon.

== Morphology ==
Bodo is a microscopic, biflagellated, kidney-shaped, single celled organism with the largest cells being 8 μm in length and 5 μm wide. Some of the smaller organisms can be as little as 3 μm in length and 2 μm wide. The organisms are transparent, but due to their uptake of photosynthetic bacteria the often resemble a green grape. Bodo includes free-living organisms with the ability to also attach themselves to a substrate using the tip of their longer flagellum. The normal function of this flagellum is locomotion, but the attachment occurs to allow feeding currents to be created. During feeding, the shorter of the two flagella, which usually has mastigonemes attached, is used in a sweeping motion to move bacteria towards the circumbuccal lappets, which lie just below the cell membrane. The circumbuccal lappets then coil around the membrane to ingest the bacteria into the buccal cavity where they can then be transported to the cytopharynx. At the cytopharynx, the bacteria are packaged into food vacuoles which allows for digestion and storage.

Within the cell, Bodo saltans also contains a contractile vacuole, a kinetoplast, a flagellar pocket, a looped mitochondria, and a nucleus. Near the kinetoplast, eight microtubules are present which are responsible for supporting the cytopharynx. These microtubules are thought to be involved in ingestion as discussed by Mitchell et al. in 1988, however it remains unconfirmed if they play an active role. The looped mitochondria takes up a large amount of the internal volume of the cell and contain the kinetoplast, a large network of circular DNA.

== Genetics ==
Even after the redefinition of the genus Bodo, Bodo saltans contains an immense genetic diversity, and it is likely that the species will have to be split further. Other species in the genus have not been studied molecularly. Kinetoplast DNA (kDNA), is made up of thousands of circular pieces of DNA that are all required in order to correctly replicate the organism. These circular genes give rise to a unique mitochondrial genome as some of the genes are not present in a completed form with fragments being located on multiple circles. This strange sorting of kDNA leads to an increase in difficulty when trying to create phylogenetic trees using kDNA.

== Species ==
- Bodo celer
- Bodo rostratus
- Bodo saltans
- Bodo uncinatus

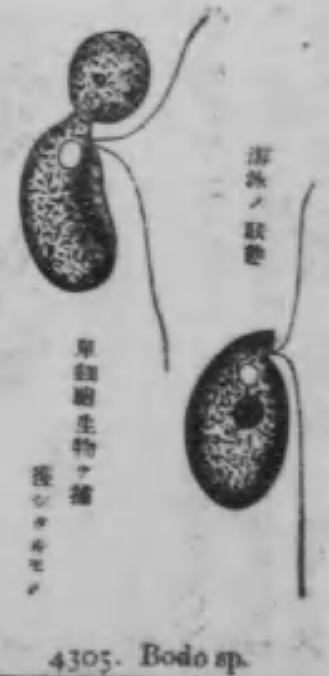
Bodo sp.

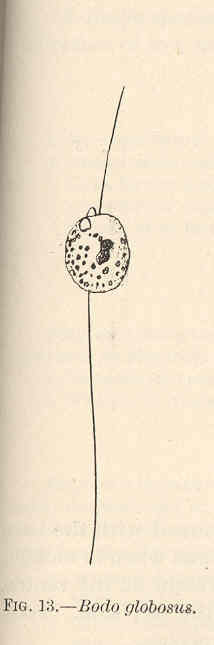
Bodo globosus

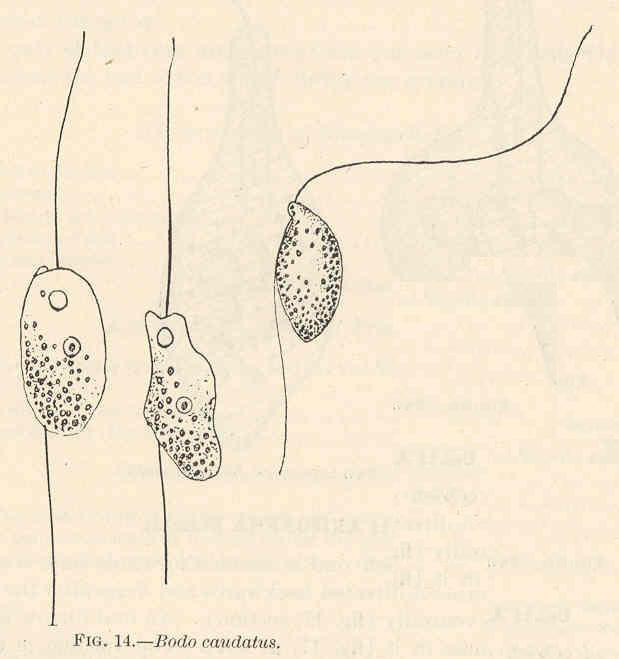
Bodo caudatus

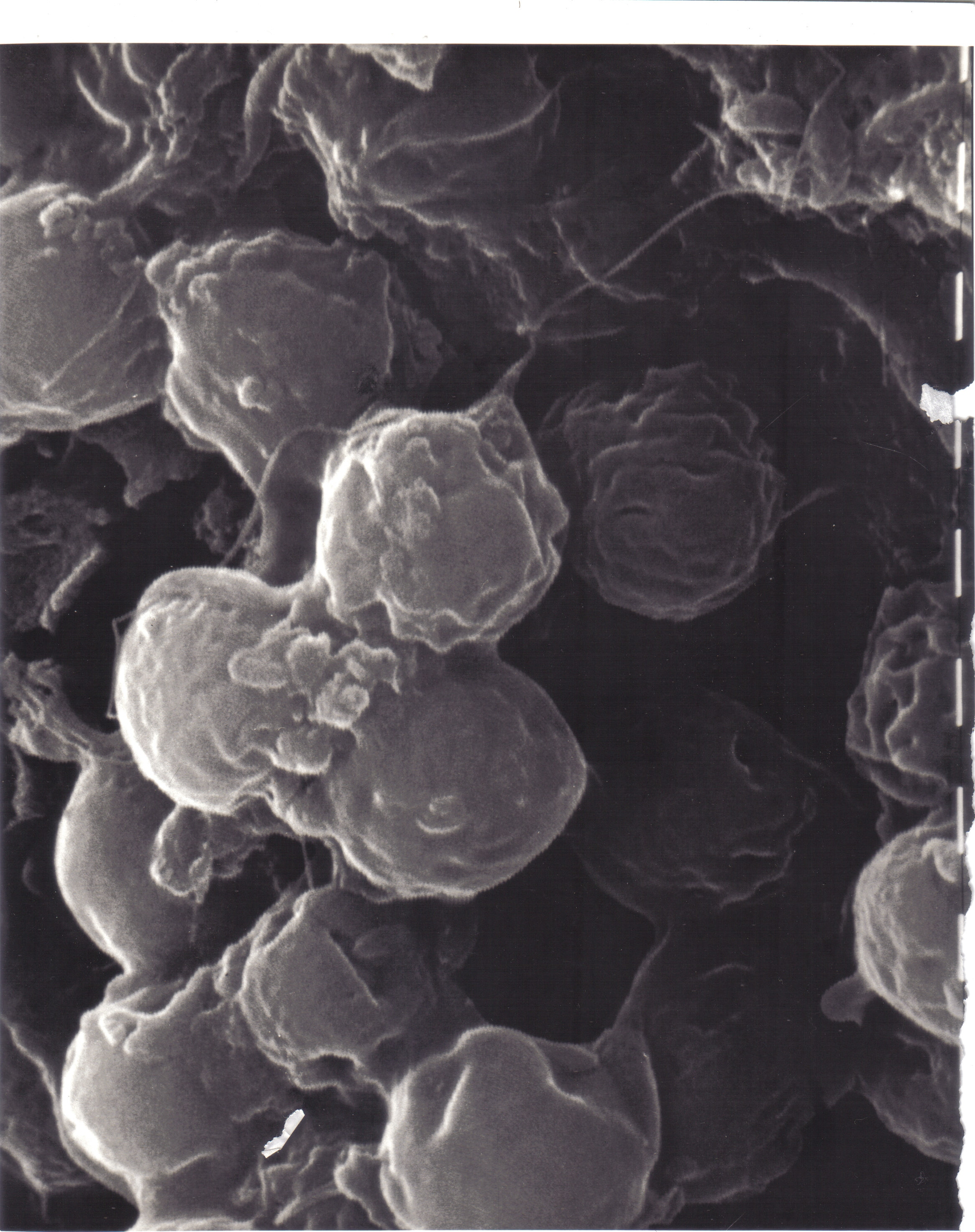
Bodo caudatus cysts
