= Cytostome =

Part of a cell

Diagram of a ciliate

A cytostome (from cyto-, cell and -stome, mouth) or cell mouth is a part of a cell specialized for phagocytosis, usually in the form of a microtubule-supported funnel or groove. Food is directed into the cytostome, and sealed into vacuoles. Only certain groups of protozoa, such as the Ciliophora and Excavata, have cytostomes. An example is Balantidium coli, a ciliate. In other protozoa, and in cells from multicellular organisms, phagocytosis takes place at any point on the cell or feeding takes place by absorption.

== Structure ==
The cytostome forms an invagination on the cell surface and is typically directed towards the nucleus of the cell. The cytostome is often labeled as the entire invagination, but in fact the cytostome only constitutes the opening of the invagination at the surface of the cell. The rest of the invagination is classified as the cytopharynx. The cytopharynx works in conjunction with the cytostome in order to import macromolecules into the cell. This strong association between the cytostome and cytopharynx is often called the cytostome-cytopharynx complex or the cytopharyngeal apparatus. However, in a small number of cases the cytostome works independently in order to import macromolecules. In these instances, the cytostome imports macromolecules by directly forming vesicles that are imported into the interior of the cell.

The cytostome is associated with microtubules that function in maintaining its form. One set of microtubules is arranged in a triplet formation and is located directly beneath the cytostome membrane. A second set of microtubules is positioned directly beneath the flagellar pocket membrane and forms a quartet.

=== Cytopharynx ===
Equally as important in the function of endocytosis is the structure known as the cytopharynx. The cytopharynx is a long, tube-like structure that forms the invagination associated with the cytostome. While the shape of the cytopharynx is not constant, it is typically directed towards the posterior of the cell, often hooking around a central nucleus. The length of the cytopharynx varies during the cell cycle, however the average length is 8 μm. Much like the cytostome, a set of microtubules form an association with the cytopharynx. Two sets of microtubules follow the path of the cytopharynx in cells. These sets of microtubules form a gutter like structure that surrounds the cytopharynx. One side of the cytopharynx is not associated with these microtubules and is deemed the "nude". However, vesicles associate with this side of the cytopharynx.

== Location ==
The location of the cytostome in most flagellated protozoa is strongly conserved. The cytostome is located on the anterior end of the cell close to a structure known as the flagellar pocket. The flagellar pocket is also an invagination in the cell and also serves as a site of endocytosis. The opening of the cytostome is approximately level with the opening of the flagellar pocket.

Ciliophora is a phylum of protozoa. The cytostome in this phyla can be either apical or lateral.

== Function ==
The cytostome-cytopharynx complex functions as follows: macromolecules to be taken up by a cell enter the cytostome. Macromolecules then pass into the lumen of the cytopharynx and are transported to the posterior end of the cell where they are put into budding vesicles that are transported to others parts of the cell. The cytopharynx in this way acts much like a straw that sucks macromolecules to the posterior end of the cell. The passage of macromolecules from the entrance of the cytostome to the posterior end of the cytopharynx takes at least 2 minutes. The cytostome is the main site of endocytosis in Trypanosoma cruzi epimastigotes.

=== Associations ===
The cytostome has also been found to associate with the flagellum of Trypanosoma cruzi. So far, this is the only known example of an endocytotic organelle being associated with an organelle that is used for locomotion.

=== Related structures ===
As mentioned above, the flagellar pocket is another site of endocytosis in flagellated protozoa. The flagellar pocket is an invagination that is formed around the extracellular flagellum. The flagellar pocket is a site of both endocytosis and exocytosis in cells.

== Visualization methods ==
Many methods have been used in order to visualize the cytostome. Eger et al. used gold labeled transferrin molecules in combination with confocal microscopy in order to visualize the cytostome. This experiment showed that labeling with the gold particles was evident at two locations in the cells; one of the locations was the bottom of the cytopharynx, and the other location was in reservosomes in the cell.

Another team used ion beam scanning electron microscopy, also known as FIB-SEM followed by three dimensional reconstruction in order to create a 3-dimensional model of the cytostome-cytopharynx complex.
