= Kinetoplast =

Network of circular DNA

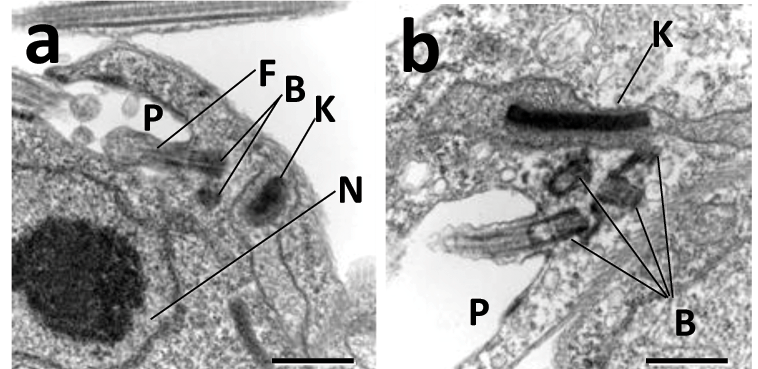
Electron micrograph of normal kinetoplast (K) of Trypanosoma brucei

A kinetoplast is a network of circular DNA (called kDNA) inside a mitochondrion that contains many copies of the mitochondrial genome. The most common kinetoplast structure is a disk, but they have been observed in other arrangements. Kinetoplasts are only found in Excavata of the class Kinetoplastida. The variation in the structures of kinetoplasts may reflect phylogenic relationships between kinetoplastids. A kinetoplast is usually adjacent to the organism's flagellar basal body, suggesting that it is bound to some components of the cytoskeleton. In Trypanosoma brucei this cytoskeletal connection is called the tripartite attachment complex.

== Trypanosoma ==
In trypanosomes, a group of flagellated protozoans, the kinetoplast exists as a dense granule of DNA within the mitochondrion. Trypanosoma brucei, the parasite which causes African trypanosomiasis (African sleeping sickness), is an example of a trypanosome with a kinetoplast. Its kinetoplast is easily visible in samples stained with DAPI, a fluorescent DNA stain, or by the use of fluorescent in situ hybridization (FISH) with BrdU, a thymidine analogue. Another parasite in the genus, Trypanosoma cruzi, causes Chagas disease in humans (primarily in Central and South America), which is transmitted through the kissing bug. The kinetoplast of T. cruzi is significantly larger than that of T. brucei. Trypanosoma equiperdum causes the disease dourine in horses, and is the only sexually transmitted trypanosome infection. The kinetoplasts of T. equiperdum are unique in that every minicircle has the same genetic sequence.

=== Tripartite attachment complex ===
The tripartite attachment complex (TAC) is a protein complex that links the kinetoplast to the flagellar basal body. In T. brucei it is essential for proper cell division, as the segregation of the kinetoplast to the two daughter cells is physically coupled to the segregation of the basal body. The complex is assembled in a hierarchical manner with the depletion of proteins proximal to the basal body leading to the loss of proteins proximal to the kinetoplast.

== Use in biochemistry and biophysics ==
Purified kinetoplast DNA from Crithidia fasciculata is sold by two biochemical companies, TopoGen and Inspiralis. The kinetoplast DNA is used as a substrate to test the functionality of drugs or toxins targeting topoisomerase II, a protein associated with cell division that can untangle DNA by passing strands through each other. Since kinetoplasts are normally too large to move through agar gel, the appearance of bands associated with minicircles during a gel electrophoresis assay indicate that topoisomerase II has decatenated the kinetoplasts. This assay can be used to determine whether drugs or toxins that target topoisomerase II are present. Kinetoplasts from C. fasciculata are also used in biophysical studies of kinetoplast DNA as a natural example of an Olympic gel.

== Structure ==
The kinetoplast contains circular DNA in two forms, maxicircles and minicircles. Maxicircles are between 20 and 40kb in size and there are a few dozen per kinetoplast. There are several thousand minicircles per kinetoplast and they are between 0.5 and 1kb in size. Maxicircles encode the typical protein products needed for the mitochondria which is encrypted. Herein lies the only known function of the minicircles—producing guide RNA (gRNA) to decode this encrypted maxicircle information, typically through the insertion or deletion of uridine (U) residues. There are usually multiple different minicircle sequences, but just one version of the maxicircle. Many edited versions are possible from a given combination of maxi- and mini-circle sequences, some of which are more common or code for more typical-looking proteins ("canonical") than others. The results of editing can mostly be deduced from these sequencecs using a program called T-Aligner, but at least one notable exception to its programmed rules exists.

The network of maxicircles and minicircles are catenated to form a planar network that resembles chain mail. Reproduction of this network then requires that these rings be disconnected from the parental kinetoplast and subsequently reconnected in the daughter kinetoplast. This unique mode of DNA replication may inspire potential drug targets.

The best studied kDNA structure is that of Crithidia fasciculata, a catenated disk of circular kDNA maxicircles and minicircles, most of which are not supercoiled. Exterior to the kDNA disk but directly adjacent are two complexes of proteins situated 180˚ from each other and involved in minicircle replication. The network topology of kinetoplast DNA is primarily understood from experiments on C. fasciculata, based on gel electrophoresis of kinetoplasts that have been broken down by restriction enzymes. These experiments indicate that each minicircle is linked to three on average, and that the crystal lattice structure most consistent with the data is the honeycomb lattice. More recent studies based on atomic force microscopy have corroborated the trivalent connectivity, but show that the structure is highly disordered.

== Variations ==
Variations of kinetoplast networks have also been observed and are described by the arrangement and location of their kDNA.

- A pro-kDNA kinetoplast is a bundle-like structure found in the mitochondrial matrix proximal to the flagellar basal body. In contrast to the conventional kDNA network, a pro-kDNA kinetoplast contains very little catenation and its maxicircles and minicircles are relaxed instead of supercoiled. Pro-kDNA has been observed in Bodo saltans, Bodo designis, Procryptobia sorokini syn. Bodo sorokini, Rhynchomonas nasuta, and Cephalothamnium cyclopi.
- A poly-kDNA kinetoplast is similar in kDNA structure to a pro-kDNA kinetoplast. It contains little catenation and no supercoiling. The distinctive feature of poly-kDNA is that instead of being composed of a single globular bundle as in pro-kDNA, the poly-kDNA is distributed among various discrete foci throughout the mitochondrial lumen. Poly-kDNA has been observed in Dimastigella trypaniformis (a commensal in the intestine of a termite), Dismastigella mimosa (a free-living kinetoplastid), and Cruzella marina (a parasite of the intestine of a sea squirt).
- A pan-kDNA kinetoplast, like poly-kDNA and pro-kDNA, contains a lesser degree of catenation but it does contain minicircles that are supercoiled. Pan-kDNA kinetoplasts fill most of the mitochondrial matrix and are not limited to discrete foci like poly-kDNA. Pan-kDNA has been observed in Cryptobia helicis (a parasite of the receptaculum seminis of snails), Bodo caudatus, and Cryptobia branchialis (a parasite of fish).
- A mega-kDNA kinetoplast is distributed fairly uniformly throughout the mitochondrial matrix, but does not contain minicircles. Instead, sequences of kDNA similar in sequence to other kinetoplast minicircles are connected in tandem into larger molecules approximately 200kb in length. Mega-kDNA (or structures similar to mega-kDNA) have been observed in Trypanoplasme borreli (a fish parasite) and Jarrellia sp. (a whale parasite).

The presence of this variety of kDNA structures reinforces the evolutionary relationship between the species of kinetoplastids. As pan-kDNA most closely resembles a DNA plasmid, it may be the ancestral form of kDNA.

== Replication ==
Figure 8. Illustration of the location of the antipodal protein complex relative to kinetoplast disk (above) and the migration of minicircle to these complexes for replication (below).

The replication of the kinetoplast occurs simultaneously to the duplication of the adjacent flagellum and just prior to the nuclear DNA replication. In a traditional Crithidia fasciculata kDNA network, initiation of replication is promoted by the unlinking of kDNA minicircles via topoisomerase II. The free minicircles are released into a region between the kinetoplast and the mitochondrial membrane called the kinetoflagellar zone (KFZ). After replication the minicircles migrate by unknown mechanisms to the antipodal protein complexes that contain several replication proteins including an endonuclease, helicase, DNA polymerase, DNA primase, and DNA ligase, which initiate repair of remaining discontinuities in the newly replicated minicircles.

This process occurs one minicircle at a time, and only a small number of minicircles are unlinked at any given moment. To keep track of which minicircles have been replicated, upon rejoining to the kDNA network a small gap remains in the nascent minicircles, which identifies them as having already been replicated. Minicircles that have not yet been replicated are still covalently closed. Immediately after replication, each progeny is attached to the kDNA network proximal to the antipodal protein complexes and the gaps are partially repaired.

Figure 9. Illustration of kinetoplast rotation during minicircle replication.

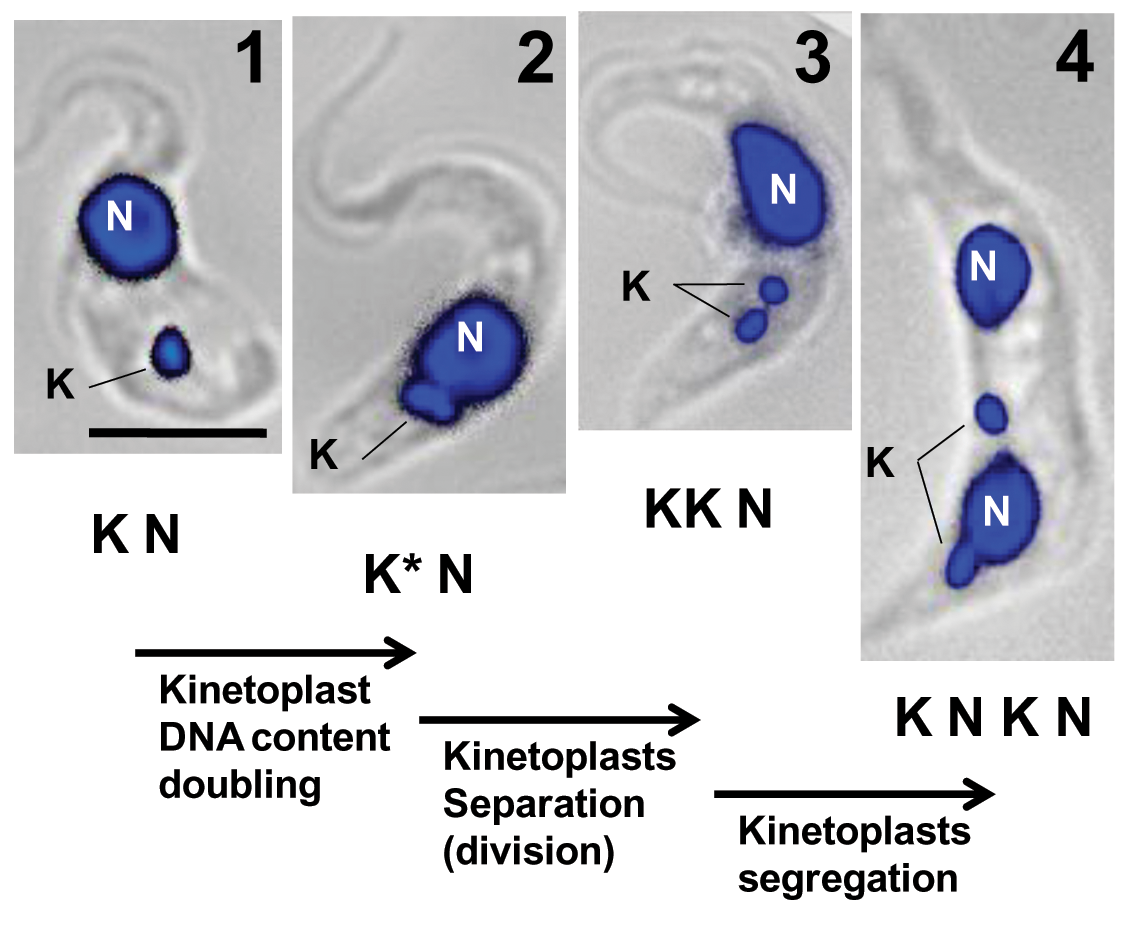
Kinetoplast (K) divides first and then the nucleus (N) in dividing T. brucei

As minicircle replication progresses, to prevent the build-up of new minicircles, the entire kDNA network will rotate around the central axis of the disk. The rotation is believed to be directly connected to the replication of the adjacent flagellum, as the daughter basal body will also rotate around the mother basal body in a timing and manner similar to the rotation of the kinetoplast. By rotating, the minicircles of the daughter kinetoplast are assembled in a spiral fashion and begin moving inward toward the center of the disk as new minicircles are unlinked and moved into the KFZ for replication.

While the exact mechanisms for maxicircle kDNA have yet to be determined in the same detail as minicircle kDNA, a structure called a nabelschnur (German for "umbilical cord") is observed that tethers the daughter kDNA networks but eventually breaks during separation. Using FISH probes to target the nabelschnur, it has been found to contain maxicircle kDNA.

Kinetoplast replication is described as occurring in five stages, each in relation to the replication of the adjacent flagellum.

- Stage I: The kinetoplast has not yet initiated replication, contains no antipodal protein complexes, and is positioned relative to a single flagellar basal body.
- Stage II: The kinetoplast begins to show antipodal protein complexes. The flagellar basal body begins replication, as does the kinetoplast. The association of the replicating kinetoplast to the two basal bodies causes it to develop a domed appearance.
- Stage III: The new flagellum begin to separate and the kinetoplast takes on a bilobed shape.
- Stage IV: The kinetoplasts appear as separate disks but remain connected by the nabelschnur.
- Stage V: The daughter kinetoplasts are completely separated as the nabelschnur is broken. Their structure is identical to that seen in Stage I.

== DNA repair ==
Trypanosoma cruzi is able to repair nucleotides in its genomic or kinetoplast DNA that have been damaged by reactive oxygen species produced by the parasite's host during infection. DNA polymerase beta expressed in T. cruzi is employed in the removal of oxidative DNA damages by the process of base excision repair. It appears that DNA polymerase beta acts during kinetoplast DNA replication to repair oxidative DNA damages induced by genotoxic stress in this organelle.
