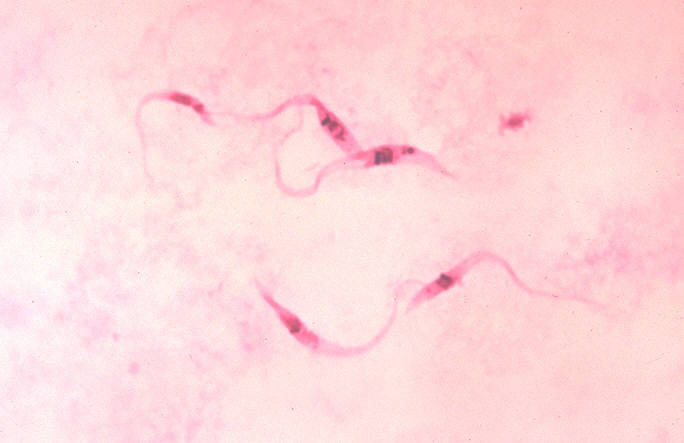
- Trypanosoma cruzi parasites

Scientific classification
- Domain: Eukaryota
- Phylum: Euglenozoa
- Subphylum: Glycomonada
- Class: Kinetoplastea; Honigberg, 1963 emend. Cavalier-Smith, 1981

Subdivisions
- ?Bordnamonadidae; ?Trypanophididae; Prokinetoplastina; Prokinetoplastida; Metakinetoplastina; Eubodonida; Neobodonida; Parabodonida; Trypanosomatida

Synonyms
- Kinetoplastida Honigberg 1963 emend. Margulis 1974

= Kinetoplastid =

Class of flagellated protozoa

Kinetoplastida (or Kinetoplastea, as a class) is a group of flagellated protists belonging to the phylum Euglenozoa, and characterised by the presence of a distinctive organelle called the kinetoplast (hence the name), a granule containing a large mass of DNA. The group includes a number of parasites responsible for serious diseases in humans and other animals, as well as various forms found in soil and aquatic environments. The organisms are commonly referred to as "kinetoplastids" or "kinetoplasts".

The kinetoplastids were first defined by Bronislaw M. Honigberg in 1963 as the members of the flagellated protozoans. They are traditionally divided into the biflagellate Bodonidae and uniflagellate Trypanosomatidae; the former appears to be paraphyletic to the latter. One family of kinetoplastids, the trypanosomatids, is notable as it includes several genera which are exclusively parasitic. Bodo is a typical genus within kinetoplastida, which also includes various common free-living species which feed on bacteria. Others include Cryptobia and the parasitic Leishmania.

== Taxonomy ==
=== History ===
Honigberg created the taxonomic names Kinetoplastida and Kinetoplastea in 1963. Since then there is no consensus on the use of either of the two as a definite taxon. Kinetoplastea is more widely used as the class, while Kinetoplastida is mostly used to designate the order, but is also used as a class. Lynn Margulis, who initially accepted Kinetoplastida as an order in 1974, later placed it as a class. Use of Kinetoplastida as an order also creates confusion as there is already an older name Trypanosomatida Kent, 1880, under which the kinetoplastids are most often placed.

=== Classification ===
Kinetoplastida is divided into two subclasses - Metakinetoplastina and Prokinetoplastina.

- Family ?Bordnamonadidae Cavalier-Smith 2013
- Family ?Trypanophididae Poche 1911
- Subclass Prokinetoplastina Vickerman 2004
  - Order Prokinetoplastida Vickerman 2004
    - Family Ichthyobodonidae Isaksen et al. 2007
- Subclass Metakinetoplastina Vickerman 2004
  - Order Neobodonida Vickerman 2004
    - Family Rhynchomonadidae Cavalier-Smith 2016
    - Family Neobodonidae Cavalier-Smith 2016
  - Order Parabodonida Vickerman 2004
    - Family Parabodonidae Cavalier-Smith 2016 [Cryptobiaceae Poche 1911; Cryptobiidae Vickerman 1976; Trypanoplasmatidae Hartmann & Chagas 1910]
  - Order Bodonida Hollande 1952 emend. Vickerman 1976
    - Family Bodonidae Bütschli 1883
  - Order Trypanosomatida Kent 1880 stat. n. Hollande 1952 emend. Vickerman 2004
    - Family Trypanosomatidae Doflein 1901 [Trypanomorphidae Woodcock 1906]

== Morphology ==
Kinetoplastids are eukaryotic and possess normal eukaryotic organelles, for example the nucleus, mitochondrion, golgi apparatus and flagellum. Along with these universal structures, kinetoplastids have several distinguishing morphological features such as the kinetoplast, sub-pellicular microtubule array and paraflagellar rod.

=== Mitochondrion and kinetoplast DNA ===
The kinetoplast, after which the class is named, is a dense DNA-containing granule within the cell's single mitochondrion, containing many copies of the mitochondrial genome. The structure is made up of a network of concatenated circular DNA molecules and their related structural proteins along with DNA and RNA polymerases. The kinetoplast is found at the base of a cell's flagella and is associated to the flagellum basal body by a cytoskeletal structure.

=== Cytoskeleton ===
The cytoskeleton of kinetoplastids is primarily made up of microtubules. These make a highly regular array, the sub-pellicular array, which runs parallel just under the cell surface along the long axis of the cell. Other microtubules with more specialised roles, such as the rootlet microtubules, are also present. Kinetoplastids are capable of forming actin microfilaments but their role in the cytoskeleton is not clear. Other cytoskeletal structures include the specialised attachment between the flagellum and the kinetoplast.

=== Flagella ===
All kinetoplastids possess at least one flagellum; species in the order trypanosomatida have one and bodonida have two. In kinetoplastids with two flagella most forms have a leading and trailing flagellum, the latter of which may be attached to the side of the cell. The flagella are used for locomotion and attachment to surfaces. The bases of the flagella are found in a specialised pocket structure which is also the location of the cytostome.

Representation of a kinetoplastid: 1. Flagellum; 2. Flagellar membrane; 3. Flagellar axoneme; 4. Paraflagellar rod; 5. Flagellar attachment zone; 6. Flagellar-associated ER; 7. Pelicular microtubules; 8. Endosome, sorts material; 9. Glycosome; 10. Acidocalcisome; 11. Mitochondrion, creates ATP (energy) for the cell (discoid cristae); 12. Nucleus; 13. Golgi apparatus, modifies proteins and sends them out of the cell; 14. Flagellar pocket collar; 15. Flagellar pocket; 16. Basal bodies; 17. Connecting fibres; 18. Kinetoplast, DNA-containing granule; 19. Antipodal site

== Life cycle ==
Kinetoplastids may be free-living or parasitic. The order trypanosomatida is notable as it includes many genera which are exclusively parasitic. Trypanosomatids may have simple life cycles in a single host or more complex ones which progress through multiple differentiation stages in two hosts. Dramatic morphological changes are possible between lifecycle stages. Diseases caused by members of the order trypanosomatida include sleeping sickness and Chagas disease, caused by species of Trypanosoma, and leishmaniasis, caused by species of Leishmania.

Trypanosoma brucei can undergo meiosis as a likely part of a sexual cycle. Leishmania major is also capable of a meiotic process that is likely part of a sexual cycle.

== Gallery ==
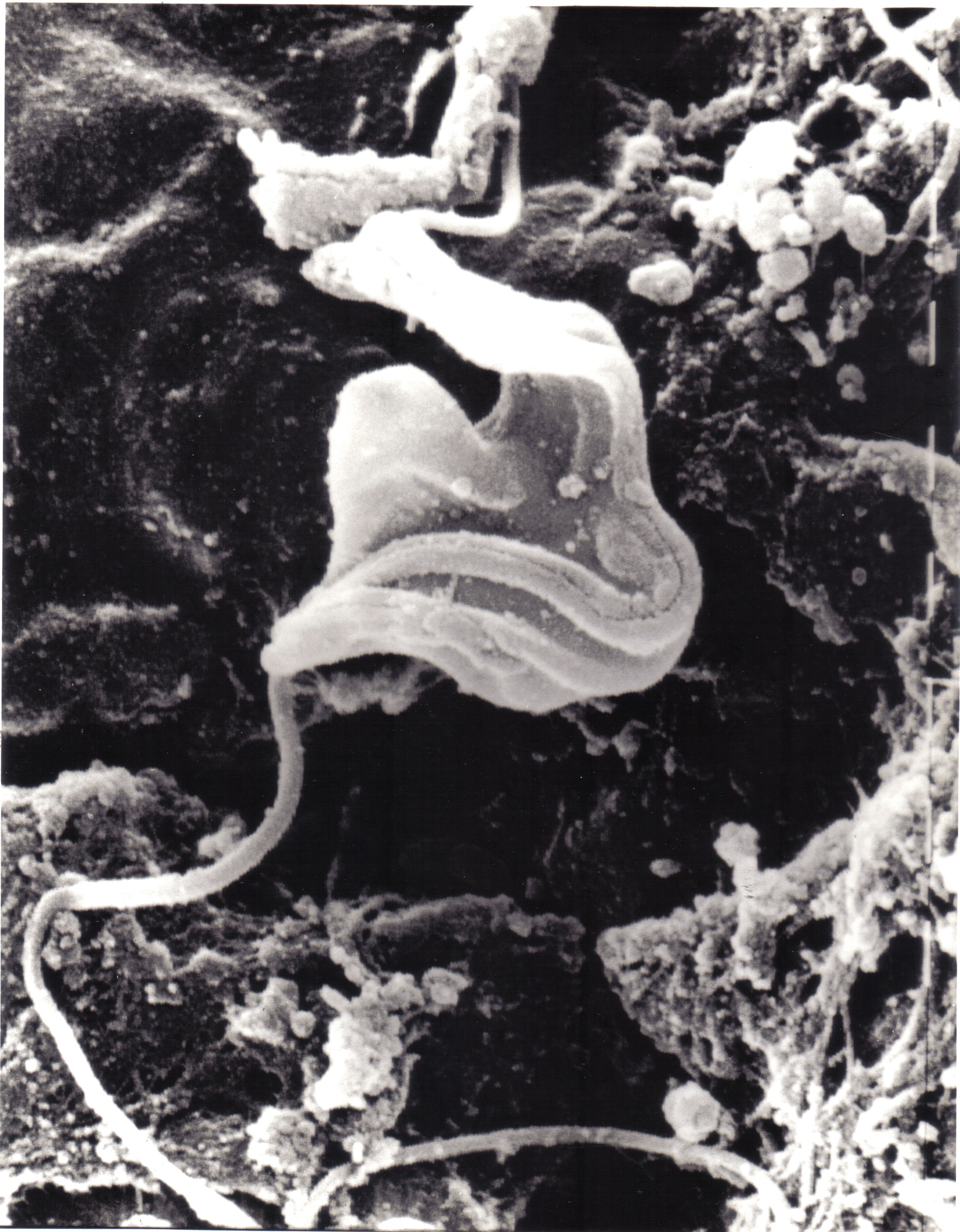
Cryptobia sp.

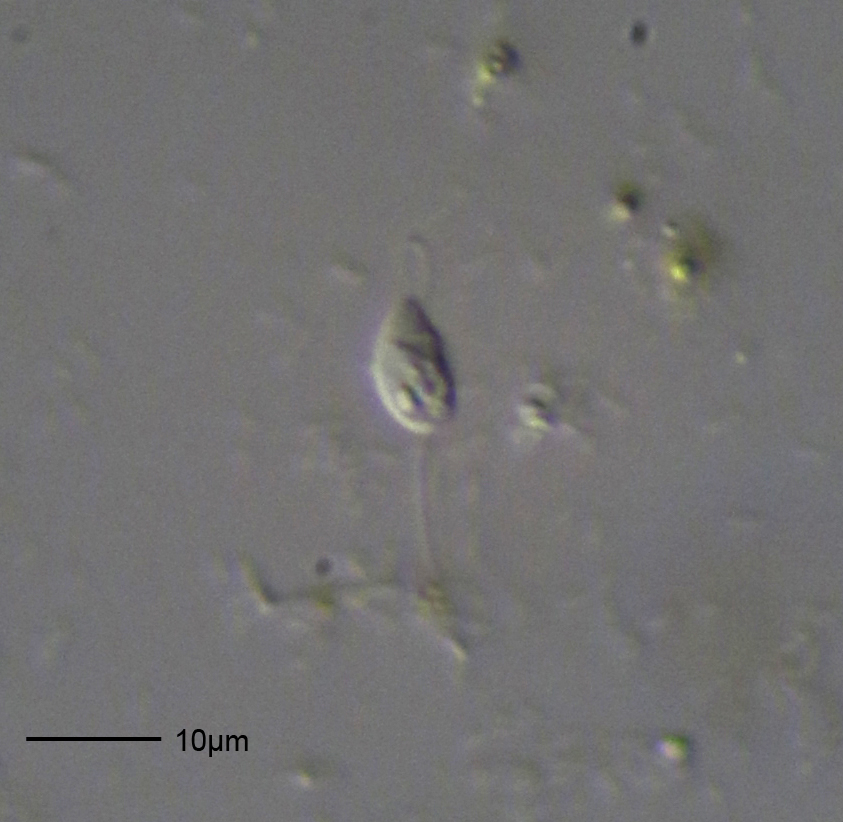
Bodo sp.

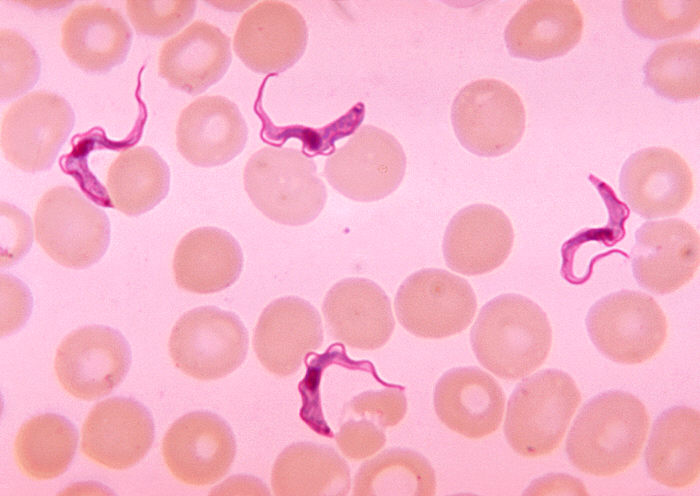
Trypanosoma sp.

== Bibliography ==
- Lumsden, W.H.R. & D.A. Evans (eds.). 1976-1979. Biology of the Kinetoplastida, 2 vols. London: Academic Press.
