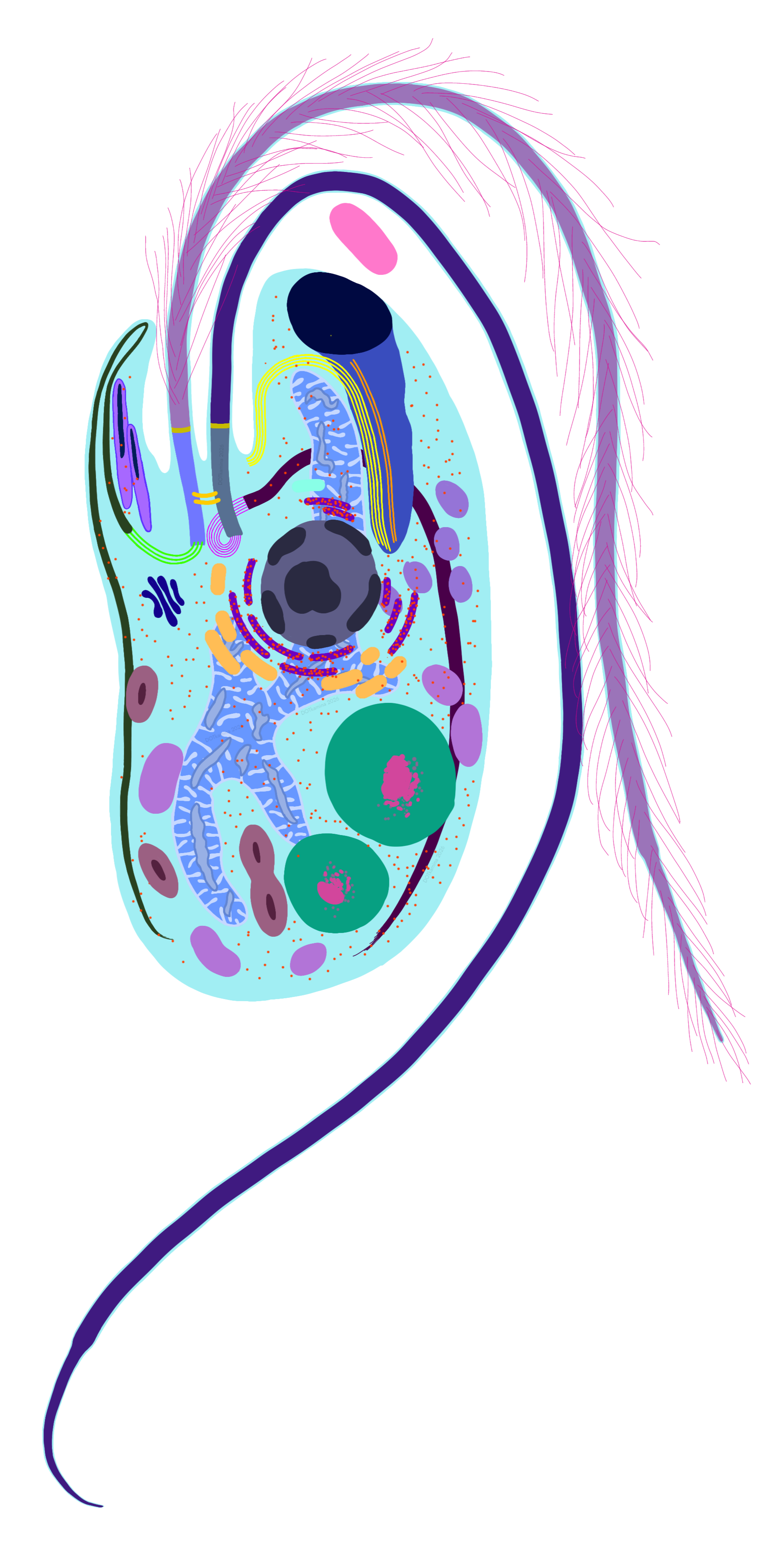
- Klosteria

Scientific classification
- Domain: Eukaryota
- (unranked): incertae sedis
- Class: Kinetoplastida
- Subclass: Metakinetoplastina
- Order: Neobodonida; Vickerman 2004: 1871

Families
- Allobodonidae; Neobodonidae; Rhynchomonadidae

= Neobodonida =

Order of single-celled organisms

Neobodonida is an order of free-living, unicellular kinetoplastid organisms, related to the parasitic members of the order Trypanosomatida. Kinetoplastids in general are frequently found in soil and water samples, but neobodonids appear to be the most abundant in various ecosystems, including halotolerant members, although morphologically they are almost indistinguishable. During the Tara Oceans expedition, 98% of the kinetoplastid samples corresponded to neobodonids, which belonged mainly to Neobodo and Rhynchomonas.

The monophyly of this order has been called into question.
