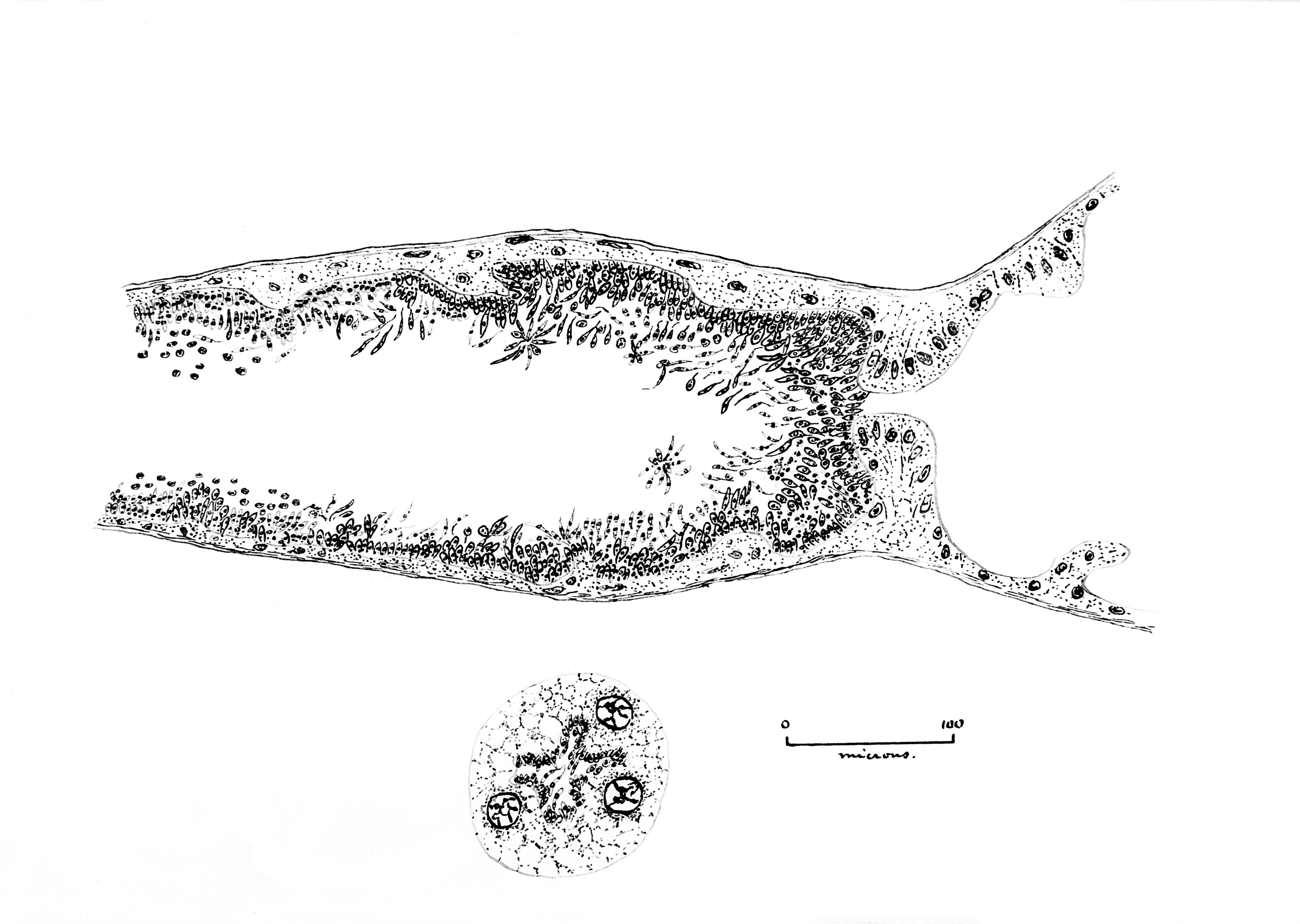
- Leptomonas etenocephali lining the lumen of intestine (longitudinal section) and Malpighan tube (transverse section) of the dog flea (Ctenocephalides canis).

Scientific classification
- Domain: Eukaryota
- Clade: Discoba
- Phylum: Euglenozoa
- Class: Kinetoplastea
- Order: Trypanosomatida
- Family: Trypanosomatidae
- Genus: Leptomonas; W.S.Kent, 1880

Species
- See text.

= Leptomonas =

Genus of parasitic flagellate protist in the Kinetoplastea class

Leptomonas is a genus of parasitic flagellate protist belonging to family Trypanosomatidae and subfamily Leishmaniinae sensu Maslov & Lukeš 2012. It is a monoxenous parasite of mainly Hemiptera, Diptera, and Siphonaptera insects.

In addition to Leptomonas, one-host trypanosomatids from insects have been traditionally placed in genera Crithidia, Blastocrithidia, Herpetomonas, Rhynchoidomonas, and Wallaceina.

== Systematics ==
The etymology of the genus name Leptomonas derives from the two Ancient Greek words λεπτός (leptós), meaning "fine-grained, tiny", and μονάς (monás), meaning "alone, isolated" (as an adjective), or "a unit" (as a name).

There are 18 species of Leptomonas.

- Leptomonas agilis Chatton
- Leptomonas brasiliense (Franchini) França
- Leptomonas buetschlii W.S. Kent
- Leptomonas ciliatorum H.-D. Görtz & J. Dieckmann, 1987
- Leptomonas costoris Wallace, Todd & Rogers
- Leptomonas davidi Lafont
- Leptomonas gerridis (Patton) Berliner
- Leptomonas karyophilus Gillies & Hanson
- Leptomonas lata Skvortzov
- Leptomonas leptoglossi Hanson & McGhee
- Leptomonas lunulata Massart
- Leptomonas lygaei (Patton) Berliner
- Leptomonas melophagia (Flu) Berliner
- Leptomonas moramango
- Leptomonas mesnili Roubaud
- Leptomonas muscae-domesticae (Diesing) Senn
- Leptomonas pangoniae Rodhain, Pons, Vandenbranden & Bequaert
- Leptomonas pisciformis Skvortzov
- Leptomonas soudanensis Roubaud
