= Strigomonadinae =

Scientific classification
- Domain: Eukaryota
- Phylum: Euglenozoa
- Class: Kinetoplastea
- Order: Trypanosomatida
- Family: Trypanosomatidae
- Subfamily: Strigomonadinae; Votypka et al., 2014

Type genus
- Strigomonas Lwoff and Lwoff, 1931

Genera
- Angomonas; Kentomonas; Strigomonas

Subfamily of protozoa

Strigomonadinae is a subfamily of protists in the order Trypanosomatida. All species in this taxon harbor endosymbiontic bacteria of the "Candidatus Kinetoplastibacterium" genus.

== Use as model organisms ==
Several species of the Strigomonadinae, notably Strigomonas culicis and Angomonas deanei have been researched as "excellent models for the study of cell evolution because the host protozoan co-evolves with an intracellular bacterium in a mutualistic relationship", and "the origin of new organelles" (i.e. symbiogenesis).
