= Wallacemonas raviniae =

Scientific classification
- Domain: Eukaryota
- Clade: Discoba
- Phylum: Euglenozoa
- Class: Kinetoplastea
- Order: Trypanosomatida
- Family: Trypanosomatidae
- Genus: Wallacemonas
- Species: W. raviniae

Binomial name
- Wallacemonas raviniae (Votýpka and Lukeš) Kostygov and Yurchenko, 2014

Species of parasitic flagellate protist in the Kinetoplastea class

Wallacemonas raviniae is a species of monoxenous trypanosomatid. It is known to parasitise Brachycera flies, and was first found in Ecuador.

Comparison and phylogenetic analysis of 18S ribosomal RNA and glycosomal glyceraldehyde-3-phosphatedehydrogenase sequences of trypanosomatid taxa suggest Wallaceina raviniae be reassigned to the newly proposed genus Wallacemonas.
