= Phytomonas =

Scientific classification
- Domain: Eukaryota
- Clade: Discoba
- Phylum: Euglenozoa
- Class: Kinetoplastea
- Order: Trypanosomatida
- Family: Trypanosomatidae
- Genus: Phytomonas; Donovan, 1909

Species
- See text.

Genus of parasitic flagellate protist in the Kinetoplastea class

Phytomonas is a genus of trypanosomatids that infect plant species. Initially described using existing genera in the family Trypanosomatidae, such as Trypanosoma or Leishmania, the nomenclature of Phytomonas was proposed in 1909 in light of their distinct hosts and morphology. When the term was originally coined, no strict criterion was followed, and the term was adopted by the scientific community to describe flagellate protozoa in plants as a matter of convenience. Members of the taxon are globally distributed and have been discovered in members of over 24 plant families. Of these 24, the two main families that are infected by Phytomonas are Euphorbiaceae and Asclepiadiacae. These protists have been found in hosts between 50° latitude North and South, and thus they can be found on all continents save for Antarctica.

Phytomonas is believed to have arisen from a single monoxenous lineage of insect parasitizing trypanosomatids some 400 million years ago. After this divergence, a heteroxenous lifestyle was developed, and most Phytomonas species are transferred between plant hosts by insect vectors in the Heteroptera suborder as a form of dixenous parasitism. Species with considerable economic impact include Phytomonas leptovasorum and Phytomonas staheli, the causative agents of phloem necrosis in coffee and wilt of coconut and oil palms, respectively.

== Etymology ==
First proposed by Donovan in 1909, the term Phytomonas describes the relationship the genus has with plants compared to closely related organisms in Trypanosomatida. Having been discovered as parasites of plants as opposed to mammals, the term phyto- was used to describe this relationship. In English, the term phyto- means plant, and comes from the Greek term for plant, phuton. The suffix -monas means 'unicellular organism' or 'single unit', and is now commonly used in the field of microbiology.

== History of knowledge ==
The organisms now known as Phytomonas were first reported in 1909 by Dr. A. Lafont, after having discovered them in the latex of the spurge plant, Euphorbia pilulifera. He named the organism Leptomonas davidi, after his lab technician David, the individual who first observed it. That same year, Donovan confirmed this by also observing the organisms in the latex of Euphorbia piluifera in Mauritius and Chennai. Because these particular trypanosomatids differed distinctly from those that were known to be parasitic to animals, Donovan proposed that a new genus of trypanosomatids, Phytomonas, had to be created.

Since 1909, trypanosomatids were reported to infect plants from around the planet, but initially, there was little scientific interest in the genus, aside from possible relations to disease-causing organisms in animals and humans. In 1931, Phytomonas were discovered in Coffea liberica plants, and was found to be the cause of coffee phloem necrosis. In following years, more parasites were observed in plants with stronger economic value, such as tomatoes (Solanum lycopersicum) The infection of economically valuable crops attracted the attention of several research groups, but interest was again lost due to the inability to cultivate cultures in vitro. In the 1970s, scientific interest was revitalized due to increasingly devastating problems caused by the parasites in even more economically significant crops, namely coconut (Cocos nucifera) and oil palm (Elaeis guineensis). Finally, in 1982, Dollet successfully cultivated trypanosomatids in vitro, which allowed for the isolation of Phytomonas in 24 different plant families from across the globe.

While there has been recent genetic work done on Phytomonas species, genome level analysis is limited compared to the genome data available for disease-causing trypanosomatids in animals and humans, especially Trypanosoma cruzi, Trypanosoma brucei, and Leishmania major. In 2015, Phytomonas nordicus was found to be a part of the generally heteroxenous genus Phytomonas, despite it being a monoxenous parasite of the predatory bug Troilus luridus. The species was described earlier in 1993. Having a monoxenous lifestyle, the species was not observed in plants, but was categorized as Phytomonas due to features that were similar to other phytomonads, namely long twisted promastigotes and flagellated stages in the salivary glands of bugs. Using molecular phylogenetic analyses, Frolov determined that the species was indeed a part of Phytomonas, despite not being a parasite of plants. In most recent news, a new dixenous species, Phytomonas oxycareni n. sp. was discovered and described in 2017, after having been obtained from the salivary glands of the true bug Oxycarenus lavaterae.

== Habitat and ecology ==
As the nomenclature Phytomonas suggests, this genus consists of trypanosomatids that infect plants. Though these organisms infect plant species from around the world, the two main plant families that contain the most Phytomonas hosts are Euphorbiaceae and Asclepiadiacae. Within host plants, Phytomonas species have been observed in multiple tissue types, including phloem, seeds, fruits, flowers, and latex ducts. Notable examples include Phytomonas serpens in tomato, P. staheli in coconut and oil palm, and P. leptovasorum in coffee. Most species do not appear to be pathogenic to their hosts or otherwise have any deleterious effects. Because the term Phytomonas was not founded on any strict criterion other than being flagellated protists in plants, the nomenclature fails to reflect the wide range of lifestyles of the various species in the genus.

Overwhelmingly, the majority of trypanosomatid species are spread via insect vectors. This is true for Phytomonas as well, and not very long after the categorization of the genus, it was found that the organisms could be transported from an infected plant to an uninfected plant using phytophagous hemipterans. Subsequent research in following years showed that Phytomonas species could be spread between plant hosts by a broad range of insect species. However, this simple view of the relationship between parasite and hosts is complicated by nomenclature and limited research. The current understanding is that the primary insect vectors are members of the Heteroptera suborder. In fact, the two main taxa with species identified as vectors are the Heteropteran families of Lygaeidae and Coreidae. In most cases, the organisms are transferred from the insect to the plant during feeding, as the parasites are present in the salivary glands.

== Description of the organism ==
=== Morphology and anatomy ===
As members of the family Trypanosomatidae, Phytomonas have structures that are characteristic of the family, including the flagellum-associated kinetoplast, subpellicular microtubules, the paraxial rod, and glycosomes. Within a host plant, Phytomonas exhibits a fusiform structure twisted 2-5 times along the longitudinal axis. Within the plant, the organisms can be in several flagellated stages: mostly promastigote with some paramastigotes in the phloem and lacticiferous tubes, and amastigote form in the latex. However, most of the species are mainly observed in the promastigote form, with an elongated body and a single 10-15 μm long flagellum emerging from the anterior flagellar pocket. This main form of their morphology is said to be consistent with insect parasites in their sister group Leishmania. Species range from 10 to 20 μm in length and have widths close to 1.5 μm. It appears that reproduction of cells occurs only in the promastigote stage. When viewed as live samples under the light microscope, Phytomonas can be seen to be incredibly active. Different species that infect different host plants have differences in external morphology, for example, oil palm (Elaeis guineensis)-infecting Phytomonas exhibit fewer twists than those in coconut (Cocos nucifera).

Like other trypanosomatids, the cell surface of Phytomonas species can be divided into the three regions of body surface, flagellar surface, and the flagellar pocket. Also like other trypanosomatids, Phytomonas does not have a cell wall, but instead are protected from host responses and environmental conditions by membrane-anchored proteins and glycoinositol phospholipids. The pellicular cell membrane is also lined with microtubules that run along the longitudinal axis of the organism, with a single row of four microtubules in the flagellar pocket. A paraxial rod also runs parallel to the axoneme of the single flagellum on one side, giving the flagella increased thickness, robustness, and strength.

As mentioned earlier, these organisms also have glycosomes, which are specialized peroxisomes. Depending on the species examined, these glycosomes may take the form of two rows separated by filamentous fibres. Some isolates of the genus also have a contractile vacuole located at the anterior end, near the flagellar pocket. This vacuole varies in size, but can be as large as 2 μm. It has been found that the endoplasmic reticulum (ER) of some species form subpellicular sheets that run parallel to the longitudinal axis. Depending on the species and isolates in question, the endoplasmic reticulum (ER) may also have ribosomes in paracrystalline array and incredibly thin intracisternal space. The cytoplasm is considered to be ribosome-rich. In close association with the flagellum is the kinetoplast. The kinetoplast DNA networks of Phyotomonas species have been found to vary in isolates extracted from various insect and plant hosts, ranging from a loose appearance to compact networks reminiscent of those of other trypanosomatids.

=== Life cycle ===
According to Dollet, reproduction occurs during the promastigote stage. Elongation of the kinetoplast occurs first, and is followed by splitting of the anterior end of the cell. Because the single flagellum morphology of trypanosomes arose from the loss of one flagellum in the flagellar pocket, this splitting results in one piece of anterior cell having one flagellum and another that does not. A new flagellum will later grow on the part that lacked a flagellum. Further longitudinal division distributes the nuclei between the forming daughter cells.

Reproduction and multiplication of Phytomonas generally stops after entering the insect host. Within the first week inside the host, the parasites elongate to form "giant" versions of themselves inside the pylorus of the host. After 12 days, cells migrate to the salivary glands via the haemolymph. It is here, in the salivary glands, where multiplication resumes again, producing regular sized forms for infection of plant hosts. Depending on species and isolate, these promastigote forms may or may not be attached to the cell walls of the salivary glands with their flagella. For example, in Phytomonas serpens, cells do attach to the interior of salivary glands, which indicates a true developmental stage within the insect host in some species.

== Agricultural importance ==
Compared to dangerous parasites of humans and animals, Phytomonas received little initial interest. Species of this genus have been found to infect many different host plants, and a majority of them do not seem to have negative effects on their hosts. However, several species are the cause of damaging diseases in many economically significant crop plants.

=== Phloem necrosis of coffee (Coffea liberica) ===
Described by Stahel in 1917, this disease is characterized by deposition of callose in the sieve tubes and necrosis. Trypanosomatids were not discovered to be the cause until Stahel observed them in the sieve tubes of Coffea liberica plants in 1931. It is now known to be caused by Phytomonas leptovasorum Stahel. The insect vector of the parasite has not been confirmed, but Stahel mainly suspected Lincus spathuliger as a culprit. Vermeulen also suspected a Hemipteran insect, due to the presence of flagellate protists in the midgut of certain bugs often found on coffee plant roots. While in the plant host, these parasites inhabit only the phloem, a characteristic that they share with P. staheli. Despite being first characterized in C. liberica, the disease can also be caused by P. leptovasorum in C. arabica, C. excelsa, C. stenophylla, and C. abeocutae. The disease caused by this phytomonad can be either acute or chronic, with the chronic form being much more frequent (95%). The two forms differ in the amount of foliage loss and killing time, but both cases involve the browning and death of the roots.

=== Hartrot of coconut (Cocus nucifera) ===
Also known as fatal wilt, bronze leaf wilt, lethal yellowing, and Coronie wilt, this disease of coconut is caused by Phytomonas staheli. This is an acute wilt, and begins at the leaves of the tree, moving down the plant towards the root. As such, the first symptoms to appear are yellowing of the leaf tips, followed by yellowing of new leaves. As unripe fruits begin to fall prematurely, rotting of the root begins. After ten weeks, the plant dies, and a foul odor arises due to secondary infection by bacteria and fungi. At first, it was believed that the disease was isolated to the east coast of South America, but in fact occurred in Colombia and Ecuador as well.

=== Marchitez of oil palm (Elaeis guineensis) ===
Phytomonas staheli also causes disease in oil palm, namely marchitez sorpresiva (sudden wilt) and slow wilt. While in the plant host, P. staheli remains in the phloem, a trait it shares with P. leptovasorum. As in hartrot of coconut, disease symptoms first appear as yellowing of leaf tips. However, in oil palm, the lower leaves are targeted first, with upper leaves being invaded next. Roots also deteriorate, starting from the growing tips and moving toward primary roots. As in coconut hartrot, fruits are also lost. Within 3–5 weeks, the plant dies and leaves become dried masses of grey. P. staheli can spread between trees quickly, and can infect up to 30 trees within a few weeks. The disease has great impact across the north of Latin America, but can be partially controlled with insecticide application. This is likely by virtue of killing insect vectors which are suspected to be known or new species in the genus Lincus.

== Medical importance ==
Aside from the harmful impact these organisms can have, Phytomonas species can also be useful as parallel models for the study of dangerous diseases caused by organisms in other infections trypanosomatid genera. Trypanosoma cruzi is the causative agent of Chagas' disease, and as a member of the family Trypanosomatidae, is related to organisms of the genus Phytomonas. In a 2015 study, Phytomonas Jma was tested as a model for the expression of heterologous proteins in the dangerous T. cruzi. It was found that Phytomonas was able to express GFP levels similar to that of T. cruzi, and it was concluded that organisms in the genus could be used as human-safe models for functional expression of trypanosomatid proteins.

Research was also done on the practical uses of antigen similarities between P. serpens and trypanosomatid pathogens. It was found that T. cruzi shares some antigens with P. serpens, and that these antigens could be recognized by rabbit and mouse sera. Immunization of mice with P. serpens induced a partial immune response against T. cruzi infection. Though more research is required, the phytomonads could potentially be used as vaccine agents to prime defense responses to T. cruzi antigens in order to interfere with the development of Chagas' disease in humans.

== List of better-known described species ==
- Phytomonas françai. Inhabits latex ducts of cassava (Manihot esculenta). The disease is known as chochamento de raizes and is characterized by very poor root development and leaf cholorsis. However, this parasite is now of lower concern, as the Unha cultivar of cassava that was susceptible to P. françai infection is no longer widely grown.
- Phytomonas leptovasorum. Inhabits phloem of coffee plants, including Coffea liberica, C. arabica, C. excelsa, C. stenophylla, and C. abeocutae. The disease caused is known as phloem necrosis of coffee and is characterized by deposition of callose in the sieve tubes and necrosis. Lincus spathuliger is the insect suspected to be the vector.
- Phytomonas nordicus. Described in 1993 by Frolov and Malysehva, this species exhibits a monoxenous lifestyle. Its sole host is the predatory bug Troilus luridus. Phylogenetic analysis using the 18S ribosomal RNA demonstrated the affinity of the species to the genus. Frolov also argued that the life cycle of P. nordicus was very similar to one of its dixenous relatives, P.serpens, albeit completing all stages within the insect host.
- Phytomonas oxycareni. Newly described in 2017. This species can be found in the midgut, the lumen of the salivary gland, and within the gland cells themselves of the insect host, Oxycarenus lavaterae.
- Phytomonas serpens. Inhabits the fruit of tomato plants. This species has antigens that are very similar to some antigens of Trypanosoma cruzi, the causative agent of Chagas' disease. The species also appears to exhibit molecules similar to Leishmanolysin that is common across all Leishmania species. In 1986, trypanosomatids were isolated from tomato plants in Brazil that could not be identified positively as Phytomoas serpens.
- Phytomonas staheli. Inhabits phloem of coconut (Cocus nucifera) and oil palm (Elaeis guineensis). They are the causative agents of hartrot of coconut and machitez of oil palm, acute lethal wilts that are characterized by wilting of leaves followed by root and spear rot. Lincus croupius and L. styliger are two insect species that appear to closely related to the spread of hartrot of coconut, and are likely vector suspects. It has also been proposed that a new species in the genus Lincus is the vector for P. staheli transfer into oil palms.
