= Crithidia pragensis =

Scientific classification
- Domain: Eukaryota
- Clade: Discoba
- Phylum: Euglenozoa
- Class: Kinetoplastea
- Order: Trypanosomatida
- Family: Trypanosomatidae
- Genus: Crithidia
- Species: C. pragensis

Binomial name
- Crithidia pragensis Yurchenko et al., 2014

Species of protozoa

Crithidia pragensis is a species of monoxenous trypanosomatid. It is known to parasitise Brachycera flies, and was first found in the Czech Republic.
