= Crithidia brevicula =

Scientific classification
- Domain: Eukaryota
- Clade: Discoba
- Phylum: Euglenozoa
- Class: Kinetoplastea
- Order: Trypanosomatida
- Family: Trypanosomatidae
- Genus: Crithidia
- Species: C. brevicula

Binomial name
- Crithidia brevicula Frolov, Malysheva, 1989

Parasitic flagellate protist

Crithidia brevicula is a species of parasitic flagellate protist belonging to the family Trypanosomatidae. It is a monoxenous parasite of insects.

Other one-host trypanosomatids from hemipteran and dipteran insects have been traditionally placed in the same genus or others like Wallaceina, Blastocrithidia, Leptomonas, Herpetomonas, and Rhynchoidomonas. Wallaceina was characterized by endomastigote morphological forms, whereas epimastigotes and opisthomastigotes were features of the genera Blastocrithidia and Herpetomonas, respectively. Later comparison and phylogenetic analysis of 18S ribosomal RNA and glycosomal glyceraldehyde-3-phosphatedehydrogenase sequences of trypanosomatid taxa revealed that Wallaceina is polyphyletic. Its species have been reassigned either to C. brevicula (for Wallaceina brevicula, W. inconstans, W. vicina, and W. podlipaevi) or to a newly proposed genus Wallacemonas (for Wallaceina collosoma, W. rigida, and W. raviniae).

The Wallaceina generic name was a replacement name for Proteomonas Podlipaev, Frolov et Kolesnikov, 1990 because the latter Proteomonas was already attributed to a cryptomonad. Wallaceina was a taxonomic patronym honoring the protistologist Franklin G. Wallace, a pioneer in the modern taxonomy of trypanosomatids.
