= Crithidia otongatchiensis =

Scientific classification
- Domain: Eukaryota
- Clade: Discoba
- Phylum: Euglenozoa
- Class: Kinetoplastea
- Order: Trypanosomatida
- Family: Trypanosomatidae
- Genus: Crithidia
- Species: C. otongatchiensis

Binomial name
- Crithidia otongatchiensis Yurchenko et al., 2014

Species of fly

Crithidia otongatchiensis is a species of monoxenous trypanosomatid. It is known to parasitise Brachycera flies, and was first found in Ecuador.
