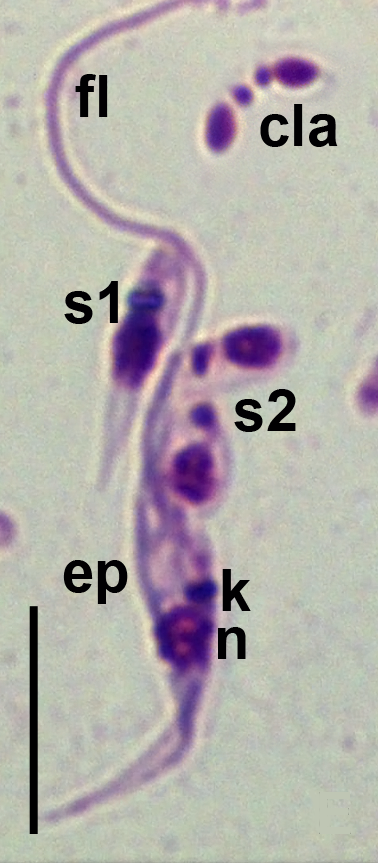
- A species of Blastocrithidia, B. papi (vertical scale bar = 10 μm).

Scientific classification
- Domain: Eukaryota
- Clade: Discoba
- Phylum: Euglenozoa
- Class: Kinetoplastea
- Order: Trypanosomatida
- Family: Trypanosomatidae
- Genus: Blastocrithidia; Laird 1959

Type species
- Blastocrithidia gerridis (Patton 1908) Laird 1959

Species
- See text

= Blastocrithidia =

Genus of parasitic flagellate protist in the Kinetoplastea class

Blastocrithidia is a genus of parasitic flagellate protist belonging to the family Trypanosomatidae. It is a monoxenous parasite of heteropteran insects, mainly inhabiting their hindgut and glands.

== Characteristics ==
In addition to Blastocrithidia, one-host trypanosomatids from hemipteran and dipteran insects have been traditionally placed in genera Crithidia, Leptomonas, Herpetomonas, Rhynchoidomonas, and Wallaceina. Blastocrithidia is characterized by epimastigote morphological forms, whereas opisthomastigotes and endomastigotes are exclusive features of the genera Herpetomonas and Wallaceina, respectively. Blastocrithidia is also able to produce resistant cysts.

== Systematics ==
The etymology of the genus name Blastocrithidia derives from the two Ancient Greek words βλαστός (blastós), meaning "sprout, scion, child or descendant", and κριθίδιον (krithídion), meaning "small grain of barley".

The genus includes the following species.

- Blastocrithidia caliroae Lipa, Carl & Valentine 1977
- Blastocrithidia cyrtomeni Caicedo et al. 2011
- Blastocrithidia euschisti Hanson & McGhee
- Blastocrithidia familiaris Tieszen et al. 1986
- Blastocrithidia gerridis (Patton 1908) Laird 1959
- Blastocrithidia largi Maslov and Lukes 2010
- Blastocrithidia leptocoridis (McCulloch 1915)
- Blastocrithidia miridarum Podlipaev & Frolov 1987
- Blastocrithidia papi Frolov and Kostygov, 2016
- Blastocrithidia raabei Lipa 1966
- Blastocrithidia triatomae Cerisola et al. 1971
- Blastocrithidia vagoi Tuzet & Laporte 1965
- Blastocrithidia nonstop Votýpka & Lukeš, sp. nov.

== Genomics ==
=== Genetic code ===
Blastocrithidia uses in its nuclear genome an alternative genetic code characterized by all three canonical stop codons reassigned to sense codons.

Table of alternative codons in Blastocrithidia and comparison with the standard genetic code
Genetic code	Translation table	DNA codon	RNA codon	Conditional translation			Standard translation
Blastocrithidia nuclear	31	TAA	UAA	Ter (*)	or	Glu (E)	Ter (*)
Blastocrithidia nuclear	31	TAG	UAG	Ter (*)	or	Glu (E)	Ter (*)
Blastocrithidia nuclear	31	TGA	UGA	Trp (W)			Ter (*)

Amino acids biochemical properties	nonpolar	polar	basic	acidic	Termination: stop codon
