= Crithidia fasciculata =

Scientific classification
- Domain: Eukaryota
- Clade: Discoba
- Phylum: Euglenozoa
- Class: Kinetoplastea
- Order: Trypanosomatida
- Family: Trypanosomatidae
- Genus: Crithidia
- Species: C. fasciculata

Binomial name
- Crithidia fasciculata Léger, 1902

Synonyms
- Crithidia lesnei (L.Léger) A.G.Alexeieff 1912; Crithidia luciliae (Strickland) F.G.Wallace & T.B.Clark 1959; Herpetomonas lesnei L.Léger 1903; Herpetomonas luciliae Strickland 1911

Species of parasitic flagellate protist in the Kinetoplastea class

Crithidia fasciculata is a species of parasitic excavates. C. fasciculata, like other species of Crithidia have a single host life cycle with insect host, in the case of C. fasciculata this is the mosquito. C. fasciculata have low host species specificity and can infect many species of mosquito.

== Life cycle ==
C. fasciculata is found in two morphologically different life cycle stages – the free swimming choanomastigote form, which has a long external flagellum for motility, and the attached, immotile, amastigote form in the mosquito gut. Amastigotes excreted in the faeces contaminate the mosquito habitat; contamination of flowers during nectar feeding is common.

Transmission of C fasciculata primarily occurs when amastigotes, washed into standing water, are ingested by mosquito larvae. The amastigotes are typically found in the rectum of a larva. Each molt of the larva results in loss of infection, but it is generally quickly re-acquired from the environment by ingestion of more amastigotes. When the fourth instar larva pupates the amastigote infection is maintained in the gut through metamorphosis giving rise to an infected adult mosquito.

== Role in research ==
C. fasciculata is an example of a non-human infective trypanosomatid and is related to several human parasites, including Trypanosoma brucei (which causes African trypanosomiasis) and Leishmania spp. (which cause Leishmaniasis). C. fasciculata parasitizes several species of insects and has been widely used to test new therapeutic strategies against parasitic infections. C. fasciculata is often used as a model organism in research into trypanosomatid biology that may then be applied to understanding the biology of the human infective species.

As is typical of the trypanosomatids, but unlike many other protists, C. fasciculata possess one mitochondrion. The mitochondrial DNA is found in a single structure, the kinetoplast, at the base of the single flagellum. As is common with parasitic species C. fasciculata requires a high nutrient content broth (including heme and folic acid) in which to grow under laboratory conditions.

Purified kinetoplast DNA from C. fasciculata is sold by two biochemical companies, TopoGen and Inspiralis. The kinetoplast DNA is often used as a substrate to test the functionality of drugs or toxins targeting Topoisomerase II, a protein associated with cell division that can untangle DNA by passing strands through each other. Since kinetoplasts are normally too large to move through agar gel, the appearance of bands associated with minicircles during a gel electrophoresis assay indicate that Topoisomerase II has decatenated the kinetoplasts. This assay can be used to determine whether drugs or toxins that target Topoisomerase II are present. Kinetoplasts from C. fasciculata are also used in biophysical studies of kinetoplast DNA, and the network topology of kinetoplast DNA is primarily understood from experiments on C. fasciculata.
