= Novymonas =

Scientific classification
- Domain: Eukaryota
- Clade: Discoba
- Phylum: Euglenozoa
- Class: Kinetoplastea
- Order: Trypanosomatida
- Family: Trypanosomatidae
- Infrafamily: Leishmaniatae
- Genus: Novymonas
- Species: N. esmeraldas

Binomial name
- Novymonas esmeraldas Kostygov and Yurchenko, 2016

Species of parasitic flagellate protist in the Kinetoplastea class

Novymonas esmeraldas is a protist and member of flagellated trypanosomatids. It is an obligate parasite in the gastrointestinal tract of a bug, and is in turn a host to symbiotic bacteria. It maintains strict mutualistic relationship with the bacteria as a sort of cell organelle (endosymbiont) so that it cannot lead an independent life without the bacteria. Its discovery in 2016 suggests that it is a good model in the evolution of prokaryotes into eukaryotes by symbiogenesis. The endosymbiotic bacterium was identified as member of the genus Pandoraea.

== Discovery ==
Novymonas esmeraldas was discovered from a bug, Niesthrea vincentii, from Ecuador. The bug was collected in July 2008 near Atacames in Esmeraldas Province, hence, the protist bears the species name. The genus name is after Frederick George Novy, an American bacteriologist and parasitologist who pioneered studies of insect trypanosomatids, and described in 1907 the first known symbiont-harbouring trypanosomatid, later named Strigomonas culicis.

== Biology ==
=== Protist ===
Novymonas esmeraldas spends it life cycle in the intestine (hindgut) of the bug, Niesthrea vincentii. During its life cycle it exists in two morphological forms, free-swimming promastigote and sedentary choanomastigote. Promastigotes are elongated and measure about 10.9 to 18 μm in length and about 1.3 to 4.8 μm in width. They bear a single flagellum in front that is 7.8 to 19.5 μm long. Choanomastigotes are more spherical in shape measuring 4.5 to 9.7 μm long and 2.8 to 6.4 μm wide. The flagellum is longer measuring 8.6 and 20.4 μm. The nucleus is centrally located, and in front of it is the kinetoplast. The kinetoplast is arranged in a compact disk which measures between 553 and 938 nm in diameter and 114 to 213 nm in cross section.

=== Bacterium ===
The endosymbiont is a bacterium classified as (Candidatus) Pandoraea novymonadis that belongs to Gram-negative rod-shaped β-proteobacteria in the family Burkholderiaceae. Unlike in other symbiont-harbouring trypanosomatids such as Strigonomas culicis, Kentomonas sorsogonicus, and Angomonas deanei, the division of the endosymbiont is not synchronized with the host. Novymonas cells can bear a different number of the endosymbionts, and some do not have the bacteria at all. This indicates that the symbiosis in Novymonas is more recent than in the case of the other endosymbiont-bearing trypanosomatids. However, in contrast to its related free-living bacteria, P. novymonadis has highly reduced genome, less genes and lower GC contents.
