= Glutathionylspermidine synthase =

Class of enzymes

Identifiers
- EC no.: 6.3.1.8
- CAS no.: 9077-09-2

Databases
- BRENDA: enzyme data
- ExPASy: NiceZyme view
- KEGG: enzyme entry
- MetaCyc: metabolic pathway
- Rhea: reactions
- PDB structures: RCSB PDB PDBe PDBsum
- Gene Ontology: AmiGO / QuickGO
Search
- PMC: articles
- PubMed: articles
- NCBI: proteins

Glutathionylspermidine synthase (EC 6.3.1.8) is an enzyme characterised from Crithidia fasciculata and Escherichia coli that catalyzes the amidation of glutathione with spermidine to give glutathionylspermidine:

glutathione
+
spermidine
ATP
ADP
H_{2}O
glutathionylspermidine

The enzyme is bifunctional and in the reverse direction is equivalent to glutathionylspermidine amidase, which hydrolyses the product back to the starting materials.

This enzyme is a ligase, specifically one forming carbon-nitrogen bonds as acid-D-ammonia (or amine) ligases (amide synthases). The systematic name of this enzyme class is gamma-L-glutamyl-L-cysteinyl-glycine:spermidine ligase (ADP-forming) [spermidine is numbered so that atom N-1 is in the amino group of the aminopropyl part of the molecule]. This enzyme is also called glutathione:spermidine ligase (ADP-forming). This enzyme participates in glutathione metabolism. It uses magnesium as a cofactor.

== Structural studies ==
As of late 2007, 5 structures have been solved for this class of enzymes, with PDB accession codes PDB: 2IO7, PDB: 2IO8, PDB: 2IO9, PDB: 2IOA, and PDB: 2IOB.
