= Angomonas ambiguus =

Scientific classification
- Domain: Eukaryota
- Clade: Discoba
- Phylum: Euglenozoa
- Class: Kinetoplastea
- Order: Trypanosomatida
- Family: Trypanosomatidae
- Genus: Angomonas
- Species: A. ambiguus

Binomial name
- Angomonas ambiguus Teixeira and Camargo, 2011

Species of protist

Angomonas ambiguus is a parasitic protist from the order Trypanosomatida.
