= Leishmanolysin =

Identifiers
- EC no.: 3.4.24.36
- CAS no.: 161052-06-8

Databases
- IntEnz: IntEnz view
- BRENDA: BRENDA entry
- ExPASy: NiceZyme view
- KEGG: KEGG entry
- MetaCyc: metabolic pathway
- PRIAM: profile
- PDB structures: RCSB PDB PDBe PDBsum
Search
- PMC: articles
- PubMed: articles
- NCBI: proteins

Leishmanolysin (EC 3.4.24.36, promastigote surface endopeptidase, glycoprotein gp63, Leishmania metalloproteinase, surface acid proteinase, promastigote surface protease) is an enzyme. This enzyme catalyses the following chemical reaction

Preference for hydrophobic residues at P1 and P1' and basic residues at P2' and P3'. A model nonapeptide is cleaved at -Ala-Tyr-Leu-Lys-Lys-

This membrane-bound glycoprotein is present in the promastigote of various species of Leishmania protozoans.
