= Crithidia bombi =

Scientific classification
- Domain: Eukaryota
- Clade: incertae sedis
- Clade: Discoba
- Phylum: Euglenozoa
- Class: Kinetoplastea
- Order: Trypanosomatida
- Family: Trypanosomatidae
- Genus: Crithidia
- Species: C. bombi

Binomial name
- Crithidia bombi Lipa and Triggiani, 1988

Species of protozoa

Crithidia bombi is a parasitic protist from the order Trypanosomatida. It is the most prevalent parasite of bumblebees.

== Ecology ==
Crithidia bombi is an important parasite of various bumblebee species, including common species like Bombus terrestris, Bombus muscorum, and Bombus hortorum. The parasites negatively impact reproductive fitness of Bombus queens, as they affect their ovarian development as well as early colony establishment after the queens emerge from hibernation.
