= Angomonas desouzai =

Scientific classification
- Domain: Eukaryota
- (unranked): incertae sedis
- Clade: Discoba
- Phylum: Euglenozoa
- Class: Kinetoplastea
- Order: Trypanosomatida
- Family: Trypanosomatidae
- Genus: Angomonas
- Species: A. desouzai

Binomial name
- Angomonas desouzai (Fiorini et al. 1989) Teixeira and Camargo

Type strain
- ATCC50305, TCC079E

Synonyms
- Crithidia desouzai Fiorini et al. 1989

Species of protist

Angomonas desouzai is a parasitic protist from the order Trypanosomatida.

== Ecology ==
Angomonas desouzai parasitizes species of the diptera and, like other species of Angomonas harbors endosymbiotic bacteria.
