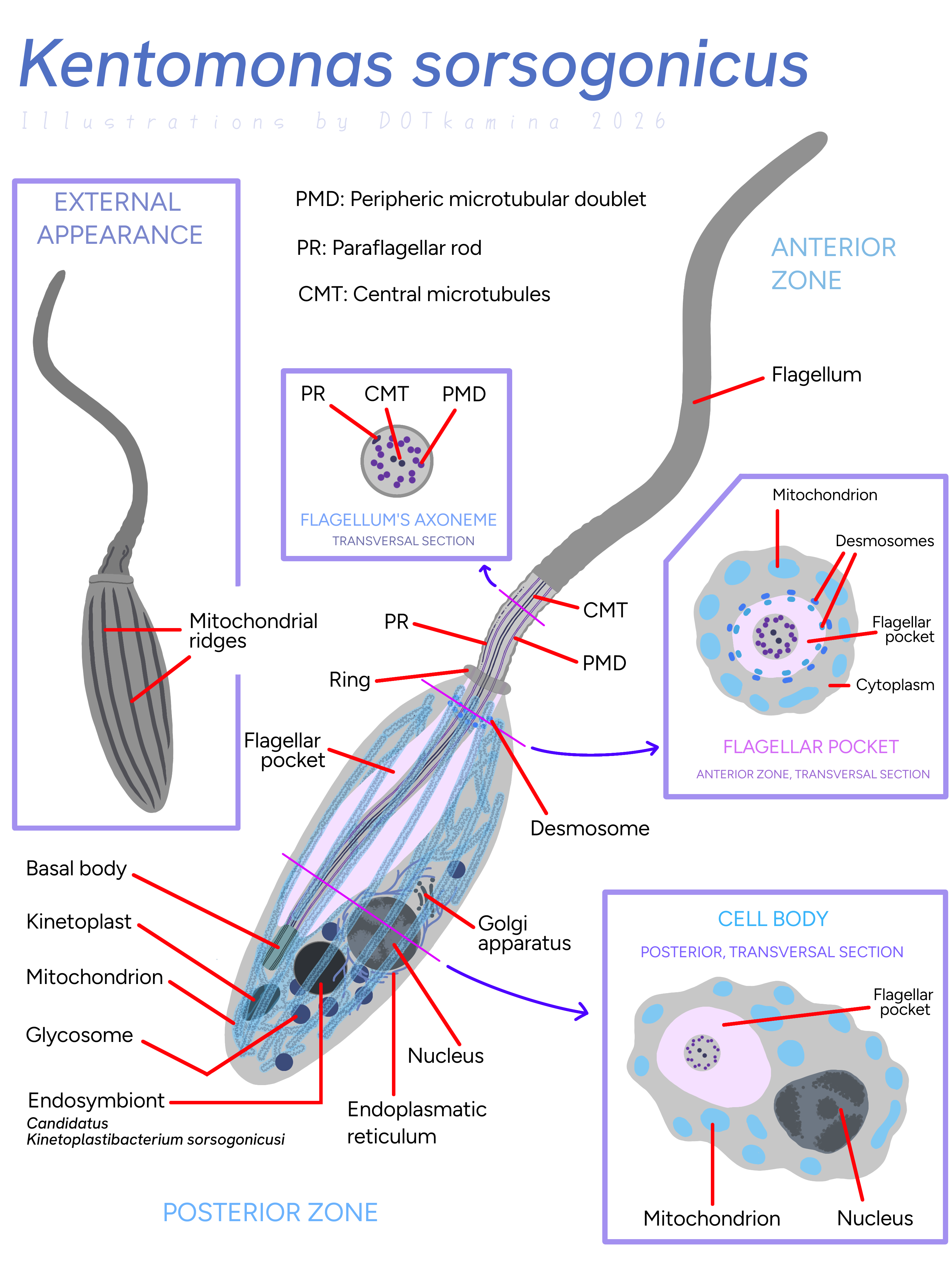

Scientific classification
- Domain: Eukaryota
- Clade: Discoba
- Phylum: Euglenozoa
- Class: Kinetoplastea
- Order: Trypanosomatida
- Family: Trypanosomatidae
- Subfamily: Strigomonadinae
- Genus: Kentomonas; Votypka et al. 2014
- Species: K. sorsogonicus

Binomial name
- Kentomonas sorsogonicus Votypka et al. 2014

= Kentomonas =

Monotypic genus of protist

Kentomonas is a monotypic genus of protist in the order Trypanosomatida. The only described species in the genus is Kentomonas sorsogonicus.

== Biology ==
Like all species in the subfamily of Strigomonadinae, K. sorsogonicus harbors endodymbiontic bacteria of the Candidatus Kinetoplastibacterium genus.
