= Anti-dsDNA antibodies =

Group of anti-nuclear antibodies

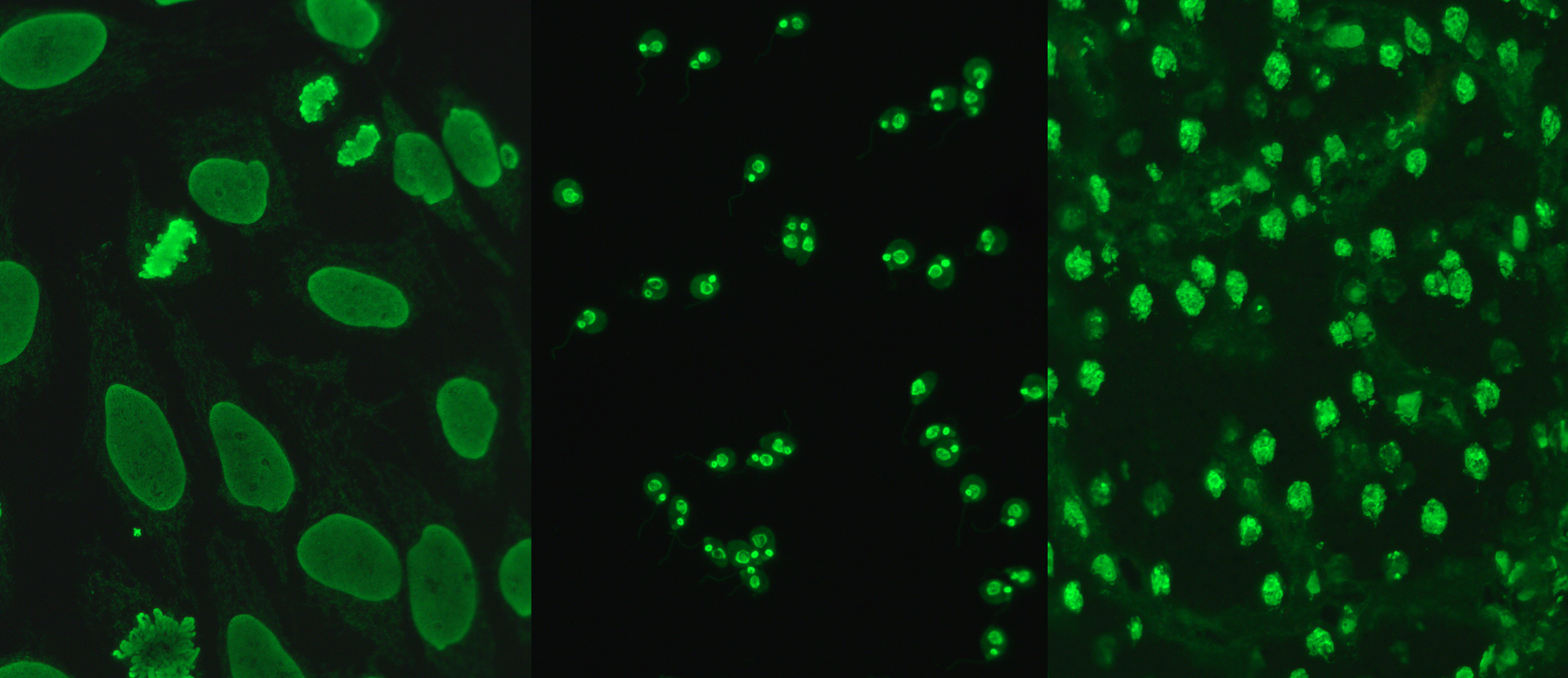
Immunofluorescence staining pattern of anti-dsDNA antibodies on HEp-20-10 cells (left), Crithidia luciliae (centre) and rat liver (right)

Anti-double stranded DNA (Anti-dsDNA) antibodies are a group of anti-nuclear antibodies (ANA) the target antigen of which is double stranded DNA. Blood tests such as enzyme-linked immunosorbent assay (ELISA) and immunofluorescence are routinely performed to detect anti-dsDNA antibodies in diagnostic laboratories. They are highly diagnostic of systemic lupus erythematosus (SLE) and are implicated in the pathogenesis of lupus nephritis.

== Discovery ==
The first evidence for antinuclear antibodies arose in 1948 when Hargraves, Richmond and Morton discovered the LE cell. These abnormal cells, which are found in the bone marrow of persons who have SLE are categorised as polymorphonuclear leukocytes with phagocytosed whole nuclei. Subsequently, in 1957, antibodies to dsDNA were the first autoantibodies to be identified in patients with SLE.

== Antibody production ==
Although the exact mechanism of the generation of dsDNA antibodies is still unknown, it is likely that extracellular DNA is one cause of an immune response against dsDNA. There is a great deal of evidence supporting the idea that dead or dying cells are one major source of this extracellular DNA. Apoptosis is the highly organised process of programmed cell death in which the cell degrades the nuclear DNA and signals for phagocytosis. In people with SLE and other autoimmune disorders this process is thought to be defective, causing either an increase in cell death and/or a decrease in the rate of dead cell clearance.

There is a higher rate of apoptosis in people with SLE and various changes in genes and proteins have been implicated in the defects in apoptosis. These include increased levels of soluble Fas and bcl-2 and polymorphisms in the programmed cell death 1 and runt-related transcription factor X1.

Blebs on apoptotic cells contain nearly all the autoantigens found in SLE, and phagocytes bind these apoptotic cells and phagocytose them. If this process is defective, these autoantigens can be released into the circulation allowing an immune response. Serum amyloid P component is a protein that is thought to aid in the clearance of chromatin produced by apoptotic cells and deficiencies in this protein have been shown (in mice) to cause spontaneous formation of ANA. Autoantigens present on the blebs of apoptotic cells are also prone to modification, which can increase their immunogenicity.

Upon release of nuclear proteins and chromatin, antigen presenting cells, such as dendritic cells and macrophages, display these antigens to T helper cells. Although the details of this process are still controversial, evidence shows that to produce an immune response, DNA must activate an antigen presenting cell to produce type 1 interferons. This cytokine serves to induce maturation of plasmacytoid dendritic cells (PDCs) so that they can display their antigens to T helper cells. The mechanism in which eukaryotic DNA activates these cells is still as yet unclear; however, immunogenic CpG sequences have been found to either activate PDCs or act as adjuvant in the response to eukaryotic DNA. CpG motif DNA acts via the pattern recognition receptor, toll-like receptor 9, found highly expressed in PDCs and B cells. The T helper cells then activate B cells, which are also in the presence of these antigens, causing the production of autoantibodies.

Anti-dsDNA antibodies can also be produced through infection via a mechanism known as molecular mimicry. Upon exposure to pneumococcal polysaccharides, cross reactive antibodies between dsDNA and pneumococcal polysaccharides are produced in lupus. Epstein–Barr virus is also known to induce dsDNA antibodies, as seen after immunisation of animals with EBNA-1 epitopes.

Anti-dsDNA antibodies might also be created secondary to the production of antibodies to other proteins within the nucleosome. Mice that have T cells directed towards the nucleosome can elicit a response to other antigens such as dsDNA and histone via a mechanism known as antigen spreading. This effect can also occur after an infection causes the production of autoantibodies to other structures within the nucleus.

== Role in disease ==
=== SLE ===
Anti-dsDNA antibodies are incredibly specific for SLE, with studies quoting nearly 100%, and are therefore used in the diagnosis of SLE. Higher titres of anti-dsDNA antibodies are more suggestive of SLE and lower titres can be found in people without the disease. In contrast to the high specificity, estimates of 25–85% have been observed for the sensitivity of anti-dsDNA in SLE. Therefore, presence of anti-dsDNA antibodies are suggestive of SLE, however an absence of the antibodies does not rule out the disease.

The levels of circulating anti-dsDNA antibodies fluctuate with disease activity in SLE. Increases in titres of the antibodies can coincide with, or even precede an increase of disease activity. For this reason titres are serially monitored by clinicians to assess disease progression. Titres are monitored more often in cases of more active lupus than that of less active lupus at intervals of 1–3 months and 6–12 months, respectively.

Anti-dsDNA antibodies are highly associated with glomerulonephritis in SLE, although some patients with high titers of anti-dsDNA antibodies do not develop renal disease. This is most likely due to the fact that anti-dsDNA are a heterogeneous population, some of which have been found not to be pathogenic. Anti-dsDNA antibodies can be present in normal individuals, however these antibodies are usually low avidity IgM isotype. In contrast, pathogenic anti-dsDNA antibodies found in SLE are usually of IgG isotype and show high avidity for dsDNA. One possible mechanism for anti-dsDNA and their role in nephritis is the formation of immune complexes that arise by indirect binding to DNA or nucleosomes that are adhered to the glomerular basement membrane (GBM). Another mechanism is direct binding of antibodies to GBM antigens such as C1q, nucleosomal proteins, heparin sulphate or laminin, which can initiate an inflammatory response by activating complement. They can also be internalised by certain molecules on the GBM cells and cause inflammatory cascades, proliferation and alteration of cellular functions.

=== Rheumatoid arthritis ===
Patients with rheumatoid arthritis can develop anti-dsDNA antibodies, however they are usually treatment related. Anti-TNFα biological therapies, such as adalimumab, infliximab and etanercept, can often induce the production of anti-dsDNA antibodies. They are usually low avidity and are only detectable transiently after treatment. The presence of these antibodies can induce a lupus-like syndrome in some cases.

=== Viral infection ===
Infection with viral pathogens can induce anti-dsDNA antibodies transiently. Human immunodeficiency virus, parvovirus B19 and BK virus are known to induce these antibodies.

=== Other diseases ===
There is little evidence supporting the association between anti-dsDNA antibodies and other diseases. Occasionally the monoclonal proteins produced by myeloma patients can be anti-dsDNA. Also, some patients with type 1 autoimmune hepatitis produce anti-dsDNA antibodies.

== Detection and quantitation ==
A variety of assay formats can be used to detect and quantify anti-dsDNA antibodies but there is no 'gold standard' for diagnostic purposes and the concordance between different assays/methods is low.

=== Farr assay ===
The Farr assay is used to quantify the amount of anti-dsDNA antibodies in serum. Ammonium sulphate is used to precipitate antigen-antibody complexes that form if the sera contains antibodies to dsDNA. The quantity of these antibodies is determined by using radioactively labelled dsDNA. Although this test is very specific, it is of little use in routine diagnostic laboratories due to its laboriousness and use of radioactive materials. The Farr assay is one of the only tests available that detects high avidity antibodies (along with Crithidia luciliae) and also has the ability to detect antibodies of any isotype.

=== PEG ===
The polyethylene glycol (PEG) assay precipitates DNA-antibody complexes, similar to the Farr Assay. However, unlike the Farr Assay it does not dissociate the low avidity antibody complexes, allowing for the detection of both high and low avidity anti-dsDNA antibodies.

=== Immunofluorescence ===
==== Animal Tissue ====
Animal tissue was the first substrate for immunofluorescent detection of antinuclear antibodies and has been in use since the late 1950s. Liver and kidney tissue sections from animals such as rats are used to identify anti-dsDNA antibodies. This substrate has largely been superseded by the use of HEp-2 cells.

==== HEp-2 ====
Hep-2 cells, originally of laryngeal carcinoma origin, are actually a contamination of HeLa cells. They are routinely used in the diagnosis of ANA in diagnostic laboratories. HEp-2 cells provide a greater ability to differentiate patterns of ANA than animal sections, due to the large nuclei and high mitotic rate of the cell line. Upon incubation with serum containing anti-dsDNA antibodies and fluorescent labelled secondary antibodies, homogeneous staining of interphase nuclei and condensed chromosomal staining of mitotic cells can be seen.

==== Crithidia ====
Crithidia luciliae is a haemoflagellate protist with an organelle known as the kinetoplast. This organelle contains a high concentration of circular DNA with no recognisable nuclear antigens, allowing for the reliable detection of anti-dsDNA antibodies. The kinetoplast fluoresces if serum contains high avidity anti-dsDNA antibodies. This test has a higher specificity than EIA because it uses unprocessed DNA. Processed DNA can contain regions of ssDNA, allowing detection of anti-ssDNA antibodies, which can give false positive results.

=== EIA ===
EIA (enzyme immunoassay) detects antibodies using a DNA-coated polystyrene microtitre plate. The DNA used in these assays is often recombinant dsDNA or from calf thymus extract. Upon incubation with serum containing anti-dsDNA antibodies, the antibodies will bind to the DNA and can then be visualised using enzyme-linked secondary antibodies. This assay can be quantitative or semi-quantitative, allowing for estimations of the levels of anti-dsDNA antibodies. This test can produce false positives due to contamination of ssDNA from denatured dsDNA. EIA detects low and high avidity anti-dsDNA antibodies, increasing its sensitivity and reducing its specificity.

=== Flow cytometry ===
Flow cytometry for the detection of ANA uses multiplexed polystyrene beads coated with multiple autoantigens, such as SSA, SSB, Sm, RNP, Scl-70, Jo-1, dsDNA, centromere B and histone. Serum is incubated with the beads and in the presence of anti-dsDNA antibodies, or any other ANA, the antibodies will bind and fluorescent labelled secondary antibodies will be used for detection. The beads are run through a flow cell which uses a laser to detect fluorescence.

=== Multiplex immunoassay (MIA) ===
Similar to the flow cytometry method of ANA detection, the MIA uses wells containing autoantigens and HEp-2 extract coated beads. The bead sets are coated with specific autoantigens and can be detected individually to allow identification of the particular autoantibody. Automated analysis of the well fluorescence allows for rapid detection of autoantibodies.

=== Microarrays ===
Microarrays are a newly emerging method for the detection of ANA. Individual autoantigens are deposited in an array of dots onto a surface such as polystyrene. A single array could consist of hundreds of autoantigens for screening of multiple autoimmune diseases simultaneously. If anti-dsDNA antibodies are present, incubation of serum and the microarray allow for binding and the dots can then be visualised using a fluorescent labelled anti-IgG antibody.

== Therapeutics ==
As a result of the highly specific nature of antibodies, they can be engineered to target and bind key motifs. These motifs can be key features within the pathogenesis of particular diseases, for example human papillomavirus.
