= Glutathionylspermidine amidase =

Class of enzymes

Identifiers
- EC no.: 3.5.1.78
- CAS no.: 171040-71-4

Databases
- BRENDA: enzyme data
- ExPASy: NiceZyme view
- KEGG: enzyme entry
- MetaCyc: metabolic pathway
- Rhea: reactions
- PDB structures: RCSB PDB PDBe PDBsum
- Gene Ontology: AmiGO / QuickGO
Search
- PMC: articles
- PubMed: articles
- NCBI: proteins

Glutathionylspermidine amidase (EC 3.5.1.78) is an enzyme characterised from Escherichia coli that catalyzes the hydrolysis of glutathionylspermidine to glutathione and spermidine:

glutathionylspermidine
H_{2}O
ADP
ATP
glutathione
+
spermidine

The enzyme is bifunctional and in the reverse direction is equivalent to glutathionylspermidine synthase but requires adenosine triphosphate in that case.

This enzyme is a hydrolase, one acting on carbon-nitrogen bonds other than peptide bonds, specifically in linear amides. The systematic name of this enzyme class is gamma-L-glutamyl-L-cysteinyl-glycine:spermidine amidase. This enzyme is also called glutathionylspermidine amidohydrolase (spermidine-forming).

== Structural studies ==
As of late 2007, 5 structures have been solved for this class of enzymes, with PDB accession codes PDB: 2IO7, PDB: 2IO8, PDB: 2IO9, PDB: 2IOA, and PDB: 2IOB.
