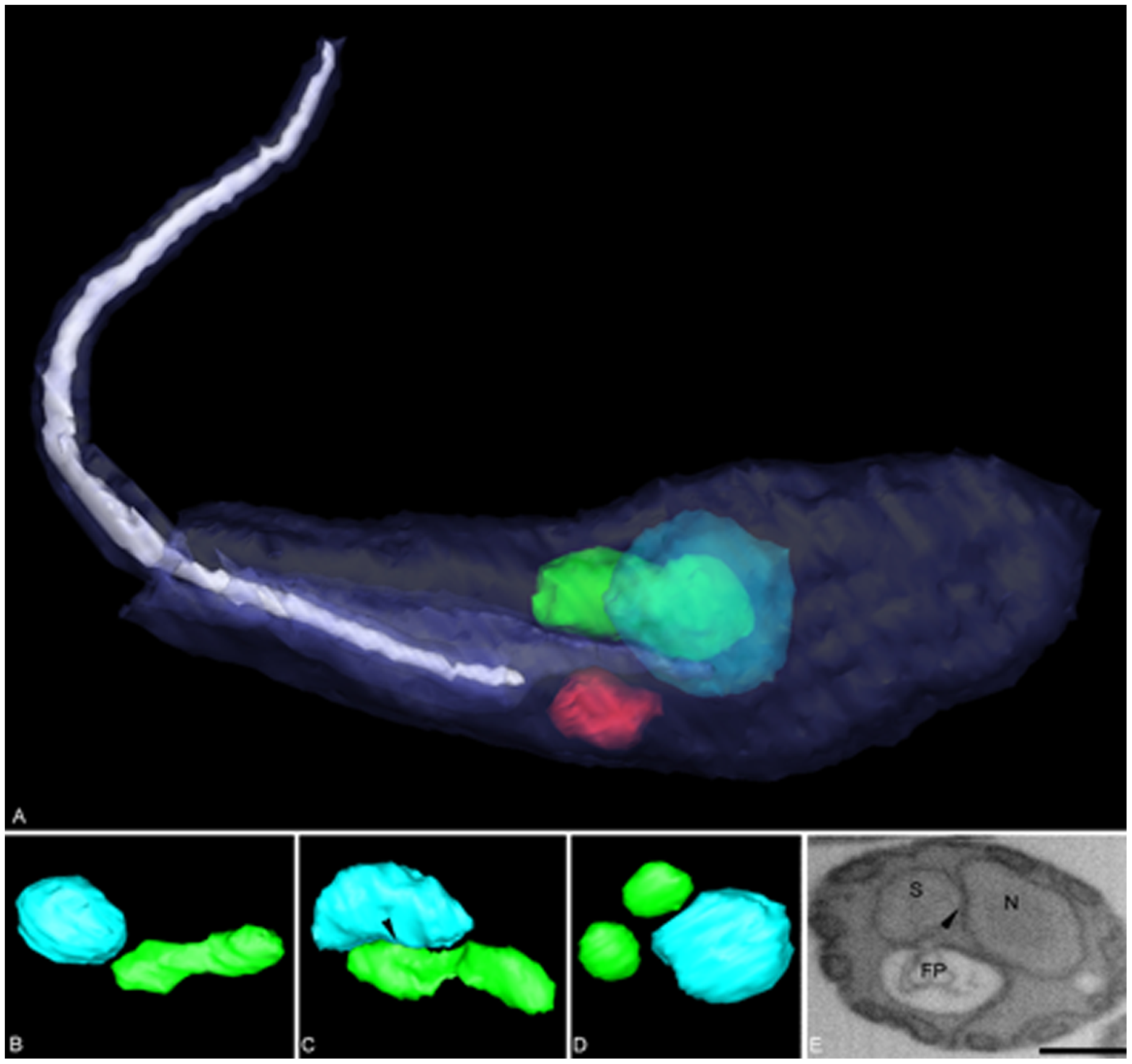
- Three-dimensional reconstruction of Angomonas deanei containing a bacterial endosymbiont (green) near its nucleus (blue).

Scientific classification
- Domain: Eukaryota
- Phylum: Euglenozoa
- Class: Kinetoplastea
- Order: Trypanosomatida
- Family: Trypanosomatidae
- Genus: Angomonas
- Species: A. deanei

Binomial name
- Angomonas deanei (Carvalho, 1973); Teixeira & Camargo, 2011

Synonyms
- Crithidia deanei Carvalho, 1973

= Angomonas deanei =

Species of parasitic flagellate protist in the Kinetoplastea class

Angomonas deanei is a flagellated trypanosomatid protozoan. As an obligate parasite, it infects the gastrointestinal tract of insects, and is in turn a host to symbiotic bacteria. The bacterial endosymbiont Ca. "Kinetoplastibacterium crithidii" maintains a permanent mutualistic relationship with the protozoan such that it is no longer able to reproduce and survive on its own. The symbiosis, subsequently also discovered in varying degrees in other protists such as Strigomonas culicis, Novymonas esmeraldas, Diplonema japonicum and Diplonema aggregatum are considered as good models for the understanding of the evolution of eukaryotes from prokaryotes, and on the origin of cell organelles (i.e. symbiogenesis).

The species was first described as Crithidia deanei in 1973 by a Brazilian parasitologist Aurora L. M. Carvalho. A phylogenetic analysis in 2011 revealed that it belongs to the genus Angomonas, thereby becoming Angomonas deanei. The symbiotic bacterium is a member of the β-proteobacterium that descended from the common ancestor with the genus Bordetella, or more likely, Taylorella. The two organisms have depended on each other so much that the bacterium cannot reproduce and the protozoan can no longer infect insects when they are isolated.

== Discovery ==
Angomonas deanei was originally described as Crithidia deanei. In 1973, a Brazilian graduate student Aurora Luiza de Moura Carvalho at the Universidade Federal de Goiás discovered the species from her study of intestinal parasites of the assassin bugs in Goiás. The next year she reported that the bug Zelus leucogrammus from which she discovered was not naturally infected by the protozoan, but it was acquired from other insects. At the same time, a research team at the Universidade de Brasilia reported the biochemical properties and structural details based on transmission electron microscopy. They discovered that it harbours an endosymbiont, describing it as "probably bacterial" that provided the "trypanosomatid essential nutrients." The bacterial nature of the endosymbiont was confirmed in 1977 when it was shown that it could be killed by treating with an antibiotic chloramphenicol, and that it helps the host in synthesising the amino acid arginine from ornithine.

As more structural and molecular details were studied, the distinction of A. deanei from other Crithidia species became more pronounced. In 1991, Maria Auxiliadora de Sousa and Suzana Corte-Real at the Instituto Oswaldo Cruz proposed a new genus Angomonas for the species. Phylogenetic study by Marta M.G. Teixeira and Erney P. Camargo at the University of São Paulo with their collaborators in 2011 validated the new species name A. deanei along with a description of a new related species A. ambiguus, which also contains the same bacterial endosymbiont.

== Structure ==
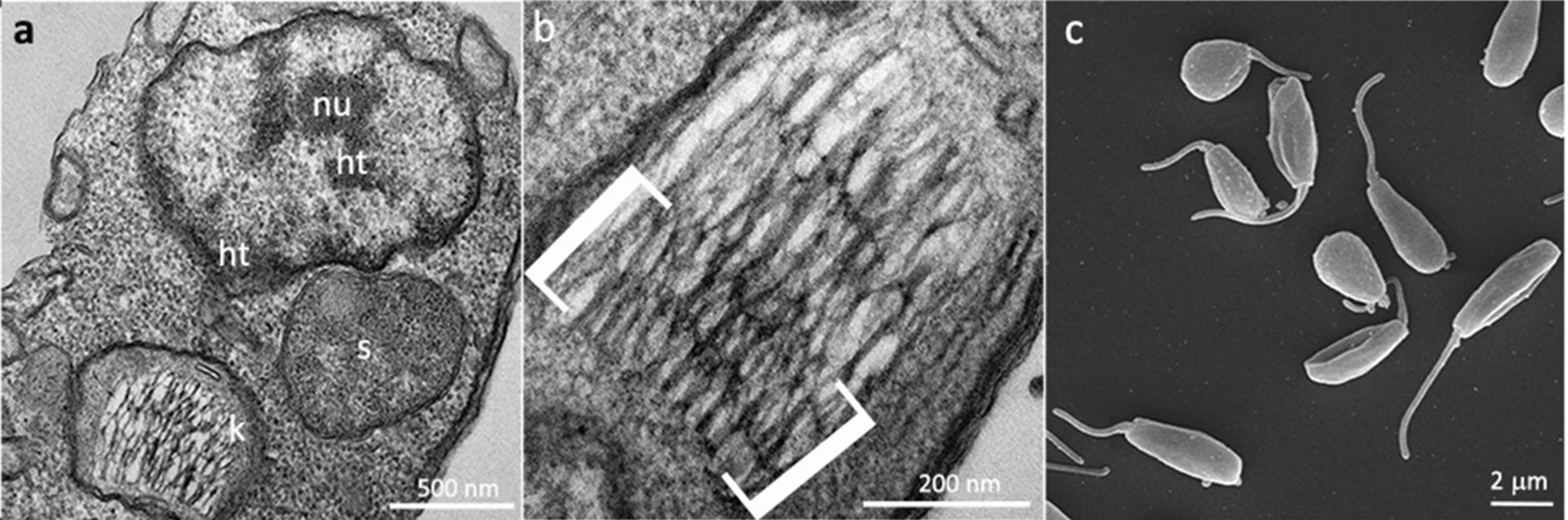
Ultrastructure and morphology of Angomonas deanei. (a) Transmission electron microscopy of the main cell body showing nucleus (nu) with heterochromatins (ht), kinetoplast (k) and bacterial symbiont (s). (b) Magnified view of the kinetoplast region showing a group of kDNA fibres. (c) Scanning electron microscopy of the protozoans; the projection from each individual is a flagellum.

The body of Angomonas deanei is elliptical in shape, with a prominent tail-like flagellum at its posterior end for locomotion. The bacterial endosymbiont is inside its body and is surrounded by two cell membranes typical of Gram-negative bacteria, but its cell membrane presents unusual features, such as the presence of phosphatidylcholine, a major membrane lipid (atypical of bacterial membranes), and the highly reduced peptidoglycan layer, which shows reduced or absence of rigid cell wall. The cell membrane of the protozoan host contains an 18-domain β-barrel porin, which is a characteristic protein of Gram-negative bacteria, and unusual of eukaryotes. In addition it contains cardiolipin and phosphatidylcholine as the major phospholipids, while sterols are absent. Cardiolipin is a typical lipid of bacterial membranes; phosphatidylcholine, on the other hand, is mostly present in symbiotic prokaryotes of eukaryotic cells. For symbiotic adaptation, the protozoan host has undergone alterations such as reduced paraflagellar rod, which is required for full motility of the bacterial flagella. Yet the paraflagellar rod gene PFR1 is fully functional. It also lacks introns and transcription of long polycistronic mRNAs required by other eukaryotes for complex gene activities. Its entire genome is distributed in 29 chromosomes and contains 10,365 protein-coding genes, 59 transfer RNAs, 26 ribosomal RNAs, and 62 noncoding RNAs.

While the protozoan has its separate mitochondria that provide electron transport system for the production of cellular energy, the ATP molecules are produced through its glycosomes. The bacterium is known to provide essential nutrients to the host. It synthesises amino acids, vitamins, nitrogenous bases and haem for the protozoan. Haem is necessary for the growth and development of the protozoan. The bacterium also provides the enzymes for urea cycle which are absent in the host. In return the protozoan offers its enzymes for the complete metabolic pathways for the biosynthesis of amino acids, lipids and nucleotides, that are absent in the bacterium. The bacterium has highly reduced genome compared to its related bacterial species, lacking many genes essential for its survival. Phosphatidylinositol, a membrane lipid required for cell-cell interaction in the bacteria is also synthesised by the protozoan. The bacterium also depends on the host for ATP molecules for its energetic functions. Thus, the two organisms intimately share and exchange their metabolic systems.

When the bacterium is killed using antibiotics, the protozoan can no longer infect insects, due to the altered glycosylphosphatidylinositol (gp63) in the protozoan flagellum. A bacterium-less protozoan exhibits reduced gene activities; particularly those involved in oxidation-reduction process, ATP hydrolysis-coupled proton transport and glycolysis are stopped. The structural components are also altered including cell surface, carbohydrate composition, paraflagellar rod and kinetoplast.

== Parasitism ==
Angomonas deanei was originally discovered from the digestive tract of the bug Zelus leucogrammus. But it was realised that the bugs are not heavily infected and were likely transmitted from other insects. It is now known to infect different mosquitos, and flies, and capable of infecting mammalian fibroblast cells under experimental conditions. Transmission from one insect to another occurs between adults (horizontal transmission) only, and the protozoan cannot fix itself in the hindgut of insect larvae. The flagellum is used as an adhesive organ that gets attached near the rectal glands and sometime directly on the surface of the rectal glands.

== Reproduction ==
Angomonas deanei (light-blue is its nucleus) coordinated division with its symbiotic bacterium (green)

The cellular reproduction shows a strong synergistic adaptation between the bacterium and the protozoan. The bacterium divides first, followed by the protozoan organelles, and lastly the nucleus. As a result the daughter protozoans contains exactly the same copies of the organelles and the bacterial endosymbiont. The entire reproduction takes about 6 hours in an ideal culture medium; thus, a single protozoan is able to produce 256 daughter cells in a day, though it can differ slightly under its natural habitat.

== The endosymbiont and evolution ==
Symbiotic bacteria in the trypanosomatid protozoa are descended from a β-proteobacterium. With A. deanei, the bacteria Ca. "Kinetoplastibacterium crithidii" have co-evolved in a mutualistic relationship characterised by intense metabolic exchanges. The endosymbiont contains enzymes and metabolic precursors that complete essential biosynthetic pathways of the host protozoan, such as those in the urea cycle and the production of haemin and polyamine.

The symbiotic bacterium belongs to β-proteobacterium family Alcaligenaceae. Based on the 16S rRNA gene sequences, it is known that it originated from a common ancestor with the one in Strigomonas culicis. The two groups are assumed to enter two different host protozoans to evolve into different species. Hence the scientific name (Candidatus) Kinetoplastibacterium crithidii was given to the bacterium. Although it was initially proposed that the bacterium evolved from a common ancestor with members of Bordetella, however, detailed phylogenomic analysis revealed that it is more closely related to members of the genus Taylorella. Re-analysis by GTDB finds the genus sister to Profftella, a symbiont of Diaphorina citri.
