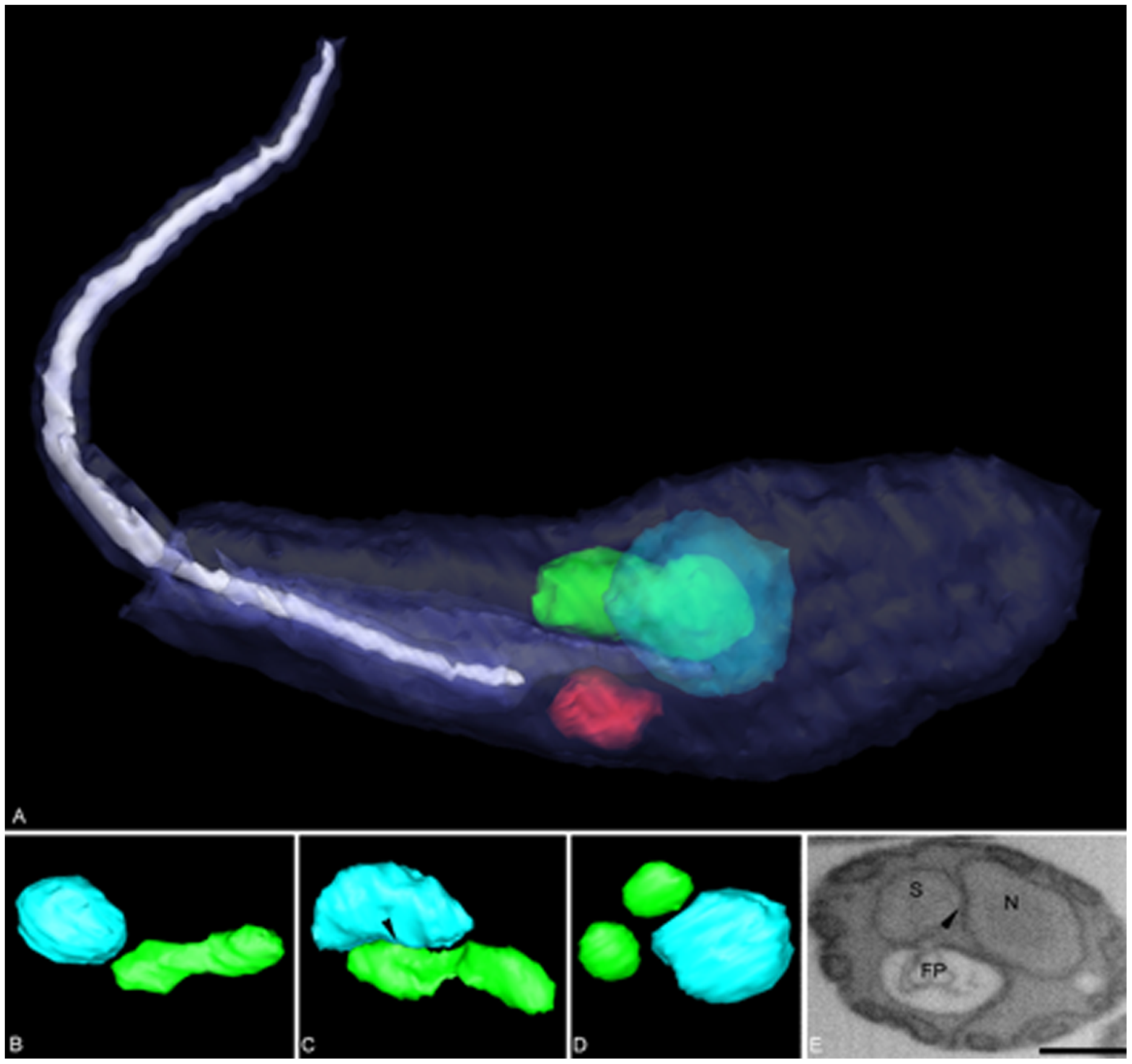
- Three-dimensional reconstruction of Angomonas deanei

Scientific classification
- Domain: Eukaryota
- Clade: Discoba
- Phylum: Euglenozoa
- Class: Kinetoplastea
- Order: Trypanosomatida
- Family: Trypanosomatidae
- Subfamily: Strigomonadinae
- Genus: Angomonas; Souza & Corte-Real, 1991

Species
- Angomonas ambiguus; Angomonas deanei; Angomonas desouzai

= Angomonas =

Genus of protists

Angomonas is a genus of protists in the order of Trypanosomatida. Several species of this genus are associated with blow flies.
