= Leptomonas moramango =

Scientific classification
- Domain: Eukaryota
- Clade: Discoba
- Phylum: Euglenozoa
- Class: Kinetoplastea
- Order: Trypanosomatida
- Family: Trypanosomatidae
- Genus: Leptomonas
- Species: L. moramango

Binomial name
- Leptomonas moramango Yurchenko et al., 2014

Species of parasitic flagellate protist in the Kinetoplastea class

Leptomonas moramango is a species of monoxenous trypanosomatid. It is known to parasitise Brachycera flies, and was first found in Madagascar.
