= Strigomonas oncopelti =

Scientific classification
- Domain: Eukaryota
- Phylum: Euglenozoa
- Class: Kinetoplastea
- Order: Trypanosomatida
- Genus: Strigomonas
- Species: S. oncopelti

Binomial name
- Strigomonas oncopelti Lwoff and Lwoff 1931

Type strain
- ATCC12982, TCC043E

Synonyms
- Crithidia oncopelti Gill and Vogel 1963; Herpetomonas oncopelti Noguchi and Tilden 1926; Leptomonas oncopelti

Species of parasitic protist

Strigomonas oncopelti is a parasitic protist from the order Trypanosomatida.
