= Strigomonas =

Scientific classification
- Domain: Eukaryota
- Clade: Discoba
- Phylum: Euglenozoa
- Class: Kinetoplastea
- Order: Trypanosomatida
- Genus: Strigomonas; M.Lwoff & A.Lwoff, 1931

Species
- Strigomonas culicis; Strigomonas galati; Strigomonas oncopelti

Genus of protists

Strigomonas is a genus of protists in the order of Trypanosomatida, harboring endodymbiontic bacteria of the Candidatus Kinetoplastibacterium genus.
