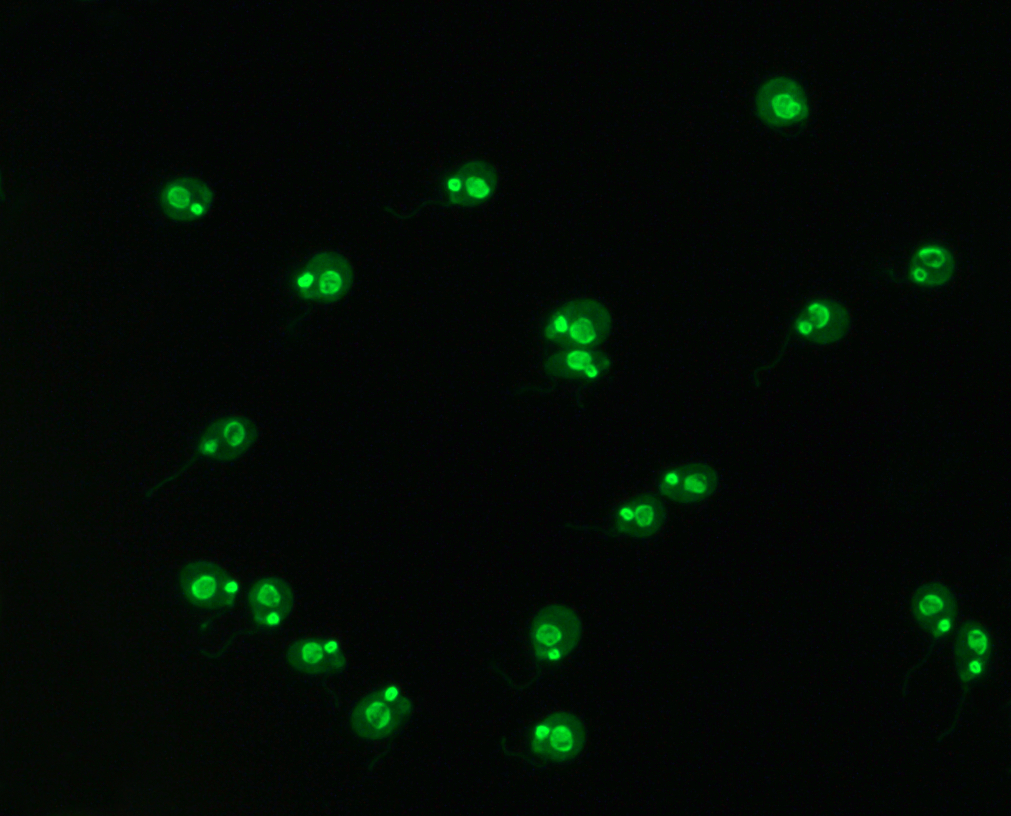
- Immunofluorescence staining pattern of anti-dsDNA antibodies on C. luciliae substrate. The kinetoplast, located near the flagellum, is stained, indicating the presence of anti-dsDNA antibodies in a person with SLE.

Scientific classification
- Domain: Eukaryota
- Clade: Discoba
- Phylum: Euglenozoa
- Class: Kinetoplastea
- Order: Trypanosomatida
- Family: Trypanosomatidae
- Genus: Crithidia
- Species: C. luciliae

Binomial name
- Crithidia luciliae (Strickland) F.G.Wallace & T.B.Clark

= Crithidia luciliae =

Species of parasitic flagellate protist in the Kinetoplastea class

Crithidia luciliae is a flagellate parasite that uses the housefly, Musca domestica, as a host. As part of the family of Trypanosomatidae, it is characterised by the presence of a kinetoplast, a complex network of interlocking circular double-stranded DNA (dsDNA) molecules. The presence of the kinetoplast makes this organism important in the diagnosis of systemic lupus erythamatosus (SLE). By using C. luciliae as a substrate for immunofluorescence, the organelle can be used to detect anti-dsDNA antibodies, a common feature of the disease.

== Taxonomy ==
Crithidia luciliae is a eukaryotic single-cell protozoan. The family Trypanosomatidae belongs to the order Kinetoplastida and is characterised by the presence of the kinetoplast, a network of interlocking circular DNA in a large mitochondrion. All organisms in Kinetoplastida are parasitic, and the host organism for C. luciliae is the housefly, Musca domestica.

== Role in systemic lupus erythematosus diagnosis ==
The kinetoplast found in C. luciliae allows them to be used for the detection of anti-dsDNA antibodies, a type of anti-nuclear antibody. Anti-nuclear antibodies are a common feature in SLE, and anti-dsDNA antibodies are highly specific for the disease. The high concentration of dsDNA and the absence of human nuclear antigens in the kinetoplast provides a specific substrate for the detection of anti-dsDNA antibodies.

== Purine nucleotide and nucleobase uptake ==
As a parasitic protozoan, C. luciliae lacks the ability to biosynthetically produce purine bases and therefore needs to salvage them from the surrounding environment. Three transport systems are used for the uptake of bases from the host organism: one for the uptake of adenosine and its analogues; one for guanosine, its analogues and inosine; and one for hypoxanthine, adenine and adenosine.
