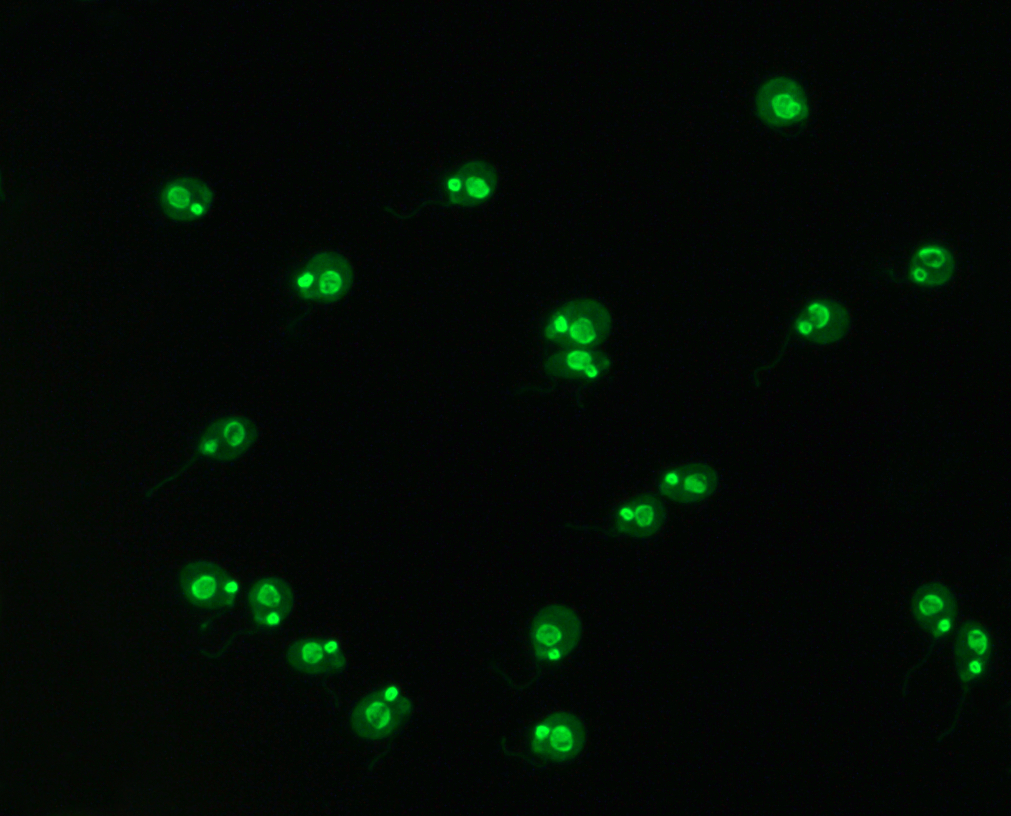
- Crithidia luciliae (immunofluorescence pattern).

Scientific classification
- Domain: Eukaryota
- Clade: Discoba
- Phylum: Euglenozoa
- Class: Kinetoplastea
- Order: Trypanosomatida
- Family: Trypanosomatidae
- Genus: Crithidia; Léger, 1902

Species
- C. abscondita; C. acanthocephali; C. bombi; C. brachyflagelli; C. brevicula; C. confusa; C. dedva; C. expoeki; C. fasciculata; C. guilhermei; C. insperata; C. luciliae; C. mellificae; C. otongatchiensis; C. permixta; C. pragensis

= Crithidia =

Genus of parasitic flagellate protist in the Kinetoplastea class

Crithidia is a genus of trypanosomatid Euglenozoa. They are parasites that exclusively parasitise arthropods, mainly insects. They pass from host to host as cysts in infective faeces and typically, the parasites develop in the digestive tracts of insects and interact with the intestinal epithelium using their flagellum. They display very low host-specificity and a single parasite can infect a large range of invertebrate hosts. At different points in its life-cycle, it passes through amastigote, promastigote, and epimastigote phases; the last is particularly characteristic, and similar stages in other trypanosomes are often called crithidial.

The etymology of the genus name Crithidia derives from the Ancient Greek word κριθίδιον (krithídion), meaning "small grain of barley".

== Species ==
- Crithidia bombi is a well documented species, notable for being a parasite of various bumblebee species, including common species like Bombus terrestris, Bombus muscorum, and Bombus hortorum.
- Crithidia mellificae is a parasite of the western honeybee, Apis mellifera.
- Crithidia brevicula might incorporate species of the genus Wallaceina (Wallaceina brevicula, W. inconstans, W. vicina, and W. podlipaevi) as suggested by molecular phylogenies based on 18S ribosomal RNA and glycosomal glyceraldehyde-3-phosphatedehydrogenase sequences.
- Other species include C. fasciculata, C. guilhermei and C. luciliae.
- C. luciliae is the substrate for the antinuclear antibody test used to diagnose lupus and other autoimmune disorders

== Impact on bumble bees ==
These parasites may be at least partially responsible for declining wild bumble bee populations. They cause the bumble bees to lose their ability to distinguish between flowers that contain nectar and those that don't. They make many mistakes by visiting nectar scarce flowers and in so doing, slowly starve to death. Commercially bred bumble bees are used in greenhouses to pollinate plants, for example tomatoes, and these bumble bees typically harbor the parasite, while wild bumble bees do not. It is believed that the commercial bumble bees transmitted the parasite to wild populations in some cases. They escape from the greenhouses through vents; a simple mesh could help prevent this.
