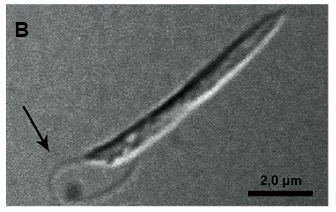
- Strigomonas culicis observed by differential interference contrast (DIC)

Scientific classification
- Domain: Eukaryota
- Supergroup: Discoba
- Phylum: Euglenozoa
- Class: Kinetoplastea
- Order: Trypanosomatida
- Family: Trypanosomatidae
- Genus: Strigomonas
- Species: S. culicis

Binomial name
- Strigomonas culicis Teixeira et al., 2011

Type strain
- ATCC12982, TCC043E

Synonyms
- Blastocrithidia culicis Wallace and Johnson, 1961; Herpetomonas culicis Novy et al. 1907

= Strigomonas culicis =

Species of parasitic flagellate protist in the Kinetoplastea class

Strigomonas culicis is a protist and member of flagellated trypanosomatids. It is an obligate parasite in the gastrointestinal tract of mosquito, and is in turn a host to symbiotic bacteria. It maintains strict mutualistic relationship with the bacteria as a sort of cell organelle (endosymbiont) so that it cannot lead an independent life without the bacteria. Along with Angomonas deanei, S. culicis is researched as model organism for the evolution of symbiotic relationships with intracellular bacteria.

== Taxonomy ==
S. culicis was first described as Trypanosoma (Herpetomonas) culicis in 1907 by Frederick G. Novy, Ward J. MacNeal, and Harry N. Torreyin 1907. The species name refers to the mosquito genus Culex in which it was found, although it has been found to also be present in other mosquitos such as Aedes. Another description by F.G. Wallace and A. Johnson as Blastocrithidia culicis, published in 1961 based on specimens from Aedes vexans, was later considered synonymous to Herpetomonas culicis. Eventually, by microbiological analysis of endosymbiont harboring Trypanosoma, this species was assigned to the genus Strigomonas in 2011, bearing the current name S. culicis.

The obligate bacterium belongs a group of ß-proteobacterium and provides nutrients to the host, in addition to influencing some of the cellular functions.

== Biology ==
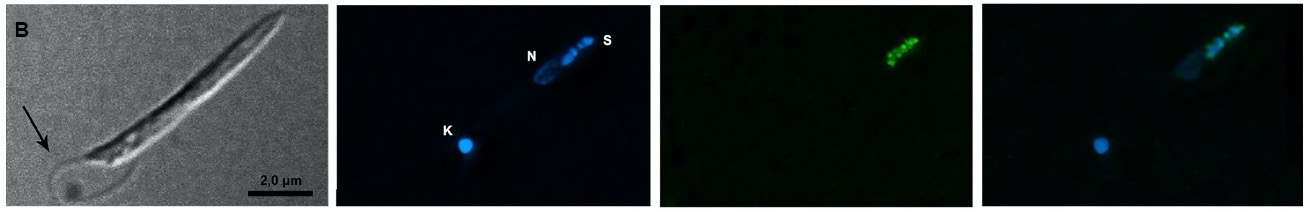
Stages of dividing Strigomonas culicis with its bacterial symbiont - S (blue in 2 picture) and green indicate the bacterium; K denotes the kinetoplast, and N, the nucleus

S. culicis spends its life cycle in mosquitos. It migrates from the mosquito midgut and enter the body cavity (haemocoel) and finally reside in the salivary glands. Unlike other trypanosomatids, S. culicis does not produce some amino acids such as methionine, histidine, and arginine; and vitamins such as thiamin, nicotinamide, and riboflavin. The bacterium provides these nutrients. In addition, it also provides enzymes required by the host for amino acid synthesis, lipid and purine/pyrimidine metabolism, urea cycle, haeme biosynthesis, protein synthesis, and protein folding. It can not reproduce on its own and relies on signals from the protist's nucleus. Isolated bacteria cannot survive on their own. When the bacteria are removed by antibiotic treatment, the protist survives but can not infect mosquitos.

S. culicis has about 12,162 open reading frames (ORFs).

=== Symbiont ===
The bacterium Ca. Kinetoplastibacterium blastocrithidii is a ß-proteobacterium of the family Alcaligenaceae. It is enclosed in two layers of cell membranes, and unlike typical bacterial membrane, peptidoglycan is greatly reduced. It acts as a cell organelle not only by supplying essential enzymes, but also by replacing paraflagellar rod associated to the axoneme, thus, intimately associated with the kinetoplast. In addition, it provides surplus supply of ATP molecules for increased metabolic activities. During cell division, as the kinetoplast of the host divides so do the bacterium. The host cell controls the number of bacterial division. This coordinated mitosis results in even distribution of one bacterium in each daughter cell.

== Ecology ==
Strigomonas culicis can be found in several mosquito genera, such as Anopheles, Culex, Aedes and Coquillettidia.
