= Glycosome =

Organelle containing glycolytic enzymes in some protists

The glycosome is a membrane-enclosed organelle that contains the glycolytic enzymes. The term was first used by Scott and Still in 1968 after they realized that the glycogen in the cell was not static but rather a dynamic molecule. It is found in a few species of protozoa including the Kinetoplastida which include the suborders Trypanosomatida and Bodonina, most notably in the human pathogenic trypanosomes, which can cause sleeping sickness, Chagas's disease, and leishmaniasis. The organelle is bounded by a single membrane and contains a dense proteinaceous matrix. It is believed to have evolved from the peroxisome. This has been verified by work done on Leishmania genetics.

The glycosome is currently being researched as a possible target for drug therapies.

Glycosomes are unique to kinetoplastids and their sister diplonemids. The term glycosome is also used for glycogen-containing structures found in hepatocytes responsible for storing sugar, but these are not membrane-bound organelles.

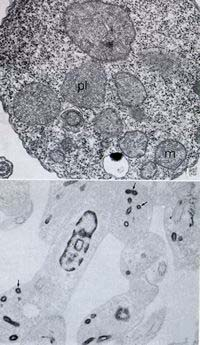
Glycosomes in the trypanosomatid

== Structure ==
Glycosomes are composed of glycogen and proteins. The proteins are the enzymes that are associated with the metabolism of glycogen. These proteins and glycogen form a complex to make a distinct and separate organelle. The proteins for glycosomes are imported from free cytosolic ribosomes. The proteins imported into the organelle have a specific sequence, a PTS1-ending sequence to make sure they go to the right place. They are similar to alpha-granules in the cytosol of a cell that are filled with glycogen. Glycosomes are typically round-to-oval shape with size varying in each cell. Although glycogen is found in the cytoplasm, that in the glycosome is separate, surrounded by membrane. The membrane is a lipid bilayer. The glycogen that is found within the glycosome is identical to glycogen found freely in the cytosol. Glycosomes can be associated or attached to many different types of organelles. They have been found to be attached to the sarcoplasmic reticulum and its intermediate filaments. Other glycosomes have been found to be attached to myofibrils and mitochondria, rough endoplasmic reticulum, sarcolemma, polyribosomes, or the Golgi apparatus. Glycosome attachment may bestow a functional distinction between them; the glycosomes attached to the myofibrils seem to serve the myosin by providing energy substrates for generation of ATP through glycolysis. The glycosomes in the rough and smooth endoplasmic reticulum make use of its glycogen synthase and phosphorylase phosphatases.

== Function ==
Glycosomes function in many processes in the cell. These processes include glycolysis, purine salvage, beta oxidation of fatty acids, and ether lipid synthesis.

=== Glycolysis ===
The main function that the glycosome serves is of the glycolytic pathway that is done inside its membrane. By compartmentalizing glycolysis inside of the glycosome, the cell can be more successful. In the cell, action in the cytosol, the mitochondria, and the glycosome are all completing the function of energy metabolism. This energy metabolism generates ATP through the process of glycolysis. The glycosome is a host of the main glycolytic enzymes in the pathway for glycolysis. This pathway is used to break down fatty acids for their carbon and energy. The entire process of glycolysis does not take place in the glycosome however. Rather, only the Embden-Meyerhof segment where the glucose enters into the glycosome. Importantly, the process in the organelle has no net ATP synthesis. This ATP comes later from processes outside of the glycosome. The inside of the glycosome does need NAD+ for functioning and its regeneration. Fructose 1,6-biphosphate is used in the glycosome as a way to help obtain oxidizing agents to help start glycolysis. The glycosome converts the sugar into 3-phosphoglycerate.

=== Purine salvage ===
Another function of glycosomes is purine salvage. The parasites which have glycosomes present in their cells cannot make purine de novo. This purine that is made in the glycosome is then exported out of the glycosome to be used in the cell in nucleic acid. In other cells the enzymes responsible for this are present in the cytosol. These enzymes found in the glycosome to help with synthesis are guanine and adenine phosphoribosyl transferase, hypoxanthine, and xanthine pho tran. All of these enzymes contain a PTS1 sequence at their carboxyl sequence so that they are sent to the glycosome.

== Evidence ==
=== Microscopic evidence ===
Microscopic techniques have revealed a lot about the glycosome in the cell and have indeed proven that there is a membrane-bound organelle in the cell for glycogen and its processes. Paul Erlich's findings as early as 1883 noted that from the microscope he could tell that glycogen in the cell was always found with what he called a carrier, later known to be protein. The glycogen itself was also always seen in the cell towards the lower pole in one group, fixed. When scientists tried to stain what was assumed was simple glycogen molecules, the staining had different outcomes. This is due to the fact that they weren't free glycogen molecules but really a glycosome. The glycosome was studied in the microscope by examining the glycosome that was stained with uranyl acetate. The U/Pb that was seen stained was the protein that was part of the glycosome. The glycogen in the glycosome in the cells is normally associated with protein that is two to four times the weight of the glycogen. The glycogen itself however, after purified, is found with very little protein, less than three percent normally, showing that the glycosome is responsible and functions by having the proteins and enzymes needed for the glycogen in the glycosome. With the uranyl staining, as an acid, it would cause dissociation of the protein from the glycogen. The glycogen without the protein would form large aggregates and the stain would be the protein. This gives the illusion of glycogen disappearing as it is not stained, but it dissociates from the protein that it is normally associated with in the glycosome.

=== Biochemical evidence ===
There has been a variety of evidence found biochemically to give evidence that glycosomes are present in cells. In the organelle that is assumed to be a glycosome, numerous proteins are found. These include glycogen synthase, phosphorylase, and branching and debranching enzymes for glycogen. All of these are regulatory enzymes that are needed in glycogen synthesis. The initiation of synthesis of glycogen requires glycogenin, found in glycosomes, a protein primer. Glycogen synthase as mentioned helps in glycogen elongation and the removal of the glucose from glycogen is aided by debranching enzymes and phosphorylase. All of these enzymes are found in the glycosome, showing that this organelle complete with glycogen as well is responsible for storing glycogen and separate from the cytosol.

== Types ==
There are two types of glycosomes that are found in cells exhibiting these specialized organelles. These two groups are lyoglycosomes and desmoglycosomes. They differ in their association with other organelles in the cell, along with their relative abundance. Studies have shown that healthy cells have more lyoglycosomes while starved cells have more desmoglycosomes.

=== Lyoglycosomes ===
Lyoglycosomes are glycosomes that are free in the cytosol of the cell. These types of glycosomes are affected by acid. They tend to be less electron dense than the other type of glycosome. Lyoglycosomes also are usually found in chains in the cytosol. Because the lyoglycosomes are not bound to tissue, it is possible to extract these glycosomes with water that is boiling.

=== Desmoglycosomes ===
Desmoglycosomes are not free in the cytosol but rather are with other organelles or structures in the cell. These structures relate to the other organelles mentioned such as the myofibrils, mitochondria, and endoplasmic reticulum. This accounts for why desmoglycosomes are found in muscle cells. These glycosomes are not affected by acid. These glycosomes are not found to form groups but rather stay separate as single organelles. Because of the high amount of protein that the glycosome associates with, a high electron density is usually observed. Desmoglycosomes are not extractable from boiling water as they are bound to tissue through their connection to protein.

== Origin ==
The glycosomes are known to have originated from peroxisomes despite the great divergence, especially as seen in the trypanosomes. This is because:

- Other variations of peroxisomes are known to exist, such as the glyoxysomes that are found in some plants and fungi.
- The glycosome shares the same basic level structure of a single membrane and a very dense protein matrix. The glycosome itself, along with the peroxisome, lacks a genome.
- Some of the proteins that are used to build the peroxisome are also seen in glycosomes of some species of the trypanosomes. For example, a variant of peroxin 2 is used in the building of glycosomes in Leishmania.
- The targeting sequences on the proteins that are sent to the glycosome for the protein matrix are similar in sequence to those sequences on proteins being imported into the peroxisome.
- The actual sequences of some enzymes going into the matrices for these two organelles are also similar, as are their corresponding metabolic pathways.

Glycosomes do differ in that they possess plastid-like proteins as well. It has been speculated that this was a result of an ancient lateral gene transfer, or a result of an ancient retargeting of plastid-destinated proteins.

== Potential drug target ==
Unlike peroxisomes, for most of the trypanosomes their glycosomes are needed for them to be able to survive. Because of this need for the glycosome, it has been suggested as a possible drug target to find a drug to halt its function. When the glycosome is not functioning correctly there is a severe lack of enzymes in the cell. These enzymes are those associated with ether-lipid synthesis or the beta oxidation of certain fatty acids. Cells without glycosomes are deficient in these enzymes as without the compartmentalization of the glycosome the enzymes are degraded in the cell in the cytosol. The organelle keeps metabolism of the enzymes from occurring. For parasites, ether-lipid synthesis is vital to be able to complete its life cycle, making the enzymes protected by the glycosome also vital. In their life cycle, glycolysis partly through the glycosome is very high in the blood stream form comparatively to the pro-cyclic form. The glycosomal glycolysis pathway is necessary in stress situations for the pathogen as glycolysis can be started when the substrates for the pathway are available even when ATP is not available yet. So as this organelle is so essential for the trypanosome, if a drug could target this organelle, it could be a successful therapy as studies have shown without the glycosome parasite death occurs.

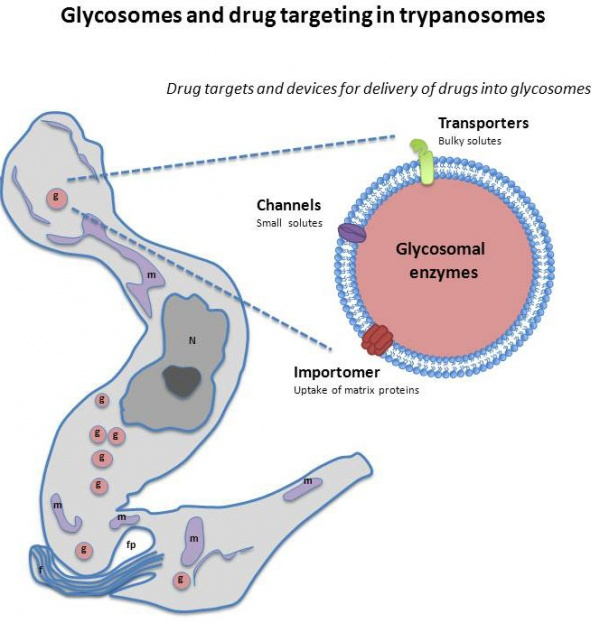
By taking advantage of the pores in the membrane of the glycosome, a drug can enter the organelle and be used to kill the trypanosoma brucei
