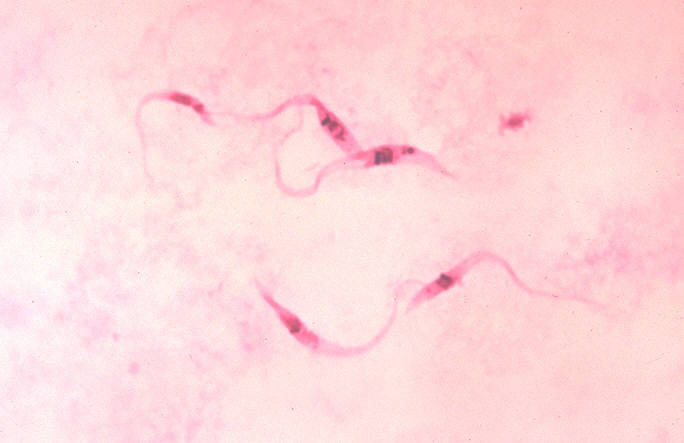
- Trypanosoma cruzi

Scientific classification
- Domain: Eukaryota
- Phylum: Euglenozoa
- Class: Kinetoplastea
- Subclass: Metakinetoplastina
- Order: Trypanosomatida; Kent 1880
- Family: Trypanosomatidae; Doflein 1901

Type genus
- Trypanosoma Gruby, 1843

Subfamilies and infrafamilies
- Blechomonadinae; Leishmaniinae; Crithidiatae; Leishmaniatae; Paratrypanosomatinae; Phytomonadinae; Strigomonadinae; Trypanosomatinae

= Trypanosomatida =

Trypanosomes Temporal range: Albian to recent 100–0 Ma

Group of single-celled parasitic organisms

Trypanosomatida is a group of kinetoplastid unicellular organisms distinguished by having only a single flagellum. The name is derived from the Greek trypano (borer) and soma (body) because of the corkscrew-like motion of some trypanosomatid species. All members are exclusively parasitic, found primarily in insects. A few genera have life-cycles involving a secondary host, which may be a vertebrate, invertebrate or plant. These include several species that cause major diseases in humans. Some trypanosomatida are intracellular parasites, with the important exception of Trypanosoma brucei.

== Medical importance ==
The three major human diseases caused by trypanosomatids are; African trypanosomiasis (sleeping sickness, caused by Trypanosoma brucei and transmitted by tsetse flies), South American trypanosomiasis (Chagas disease, caused by T. cruzi and transmitted by triatomine bugs), and leishmaniasis (a set of trypanosomal diseases caused by various species of Leishmania transmitted by sandflies).

== Evolution ==
The family is known from fossils of the extinct genus Paleoleishmania preserved in Burmese amber dating to the Albian (100 mya) and Dominican amber from the Burdigalian (20–15 mya) of Hispaniola. The genus Trypanosoma is also represented in Dominican amber in the extinct species T. antiquus.

The family contains both dixenous (two hosts in the life cycle) and monoxenous (one host in the life cycle) species. The dixenous lifestyle occurs in three lineages: one for plants (Phytomonas), two for vertebrates (Leishmania/Porcisia/Endotrypanum and Trypanosoma). These are believed to have evolved separately. The rest of the family is monoxenous, with the most common host being insects.

The trypanosomatids are also notable for the presence of a glycosome, which contains sugar-breakdown enzymes that are most closely related to algae. Some researchers believe that the presence of an entire block of enzymes is indicative of a past where an ancestral trypanosomatid engulfed an alga (probably a green alga) and co-opted some of its genetic material. Regardless of the cause of this occurrence, this difference in sugar metabolism is a potential target of therapies.

== Taxonomy ==
- Family Trypanosomatidae Calkins 1926 [Trypanomorphidae Woodcock 1906; Trypanosomataceae Senn 1911]
  - Genus Agamomonas Grassé 1952
  - Genus Batracoleishmania Dasgupta 2011
  - Genus Blastocrithidia Laird 1959
  - Genus Cercoplasma Roubaud 1911
  - Genus Cystotrypanosoma Roubaud 1911
  - Genus Jaenimonas Votypka & Hamilton 2015
  - Genus Lamellasoma Davis 1947
  - Genus Leptowallaceina Podlipaev & Frolov 2000
  - Genus Lewisonella Chalmers 1918 nomen dubium
  - Genus Malacozoomonas Nicoli, Penaud & Timon-David 1972
  - Genus Nematodomonas Nicoli, Penaud & Timon-David 1972
  - Genus †Paleoleishmania Poinar & Poinar, 2004
  - Genus †Paleotrypanosoma Poinar 2008
  - Genus Paramecioides Grassé 1882
  - Genus Sauroleishmania Ranque 1973
  - Genus Sergeia Svobodová et al. 2007 non Stimpson 1860 non Nasonov 1923 non Sergio Manning & Lemaitre 1994
  - Genus Trypanomonas Danilewsky 1885
  - Genus Trypanomorpha Woodcock 1906
  - Genus Undulina Lankester 187
  - Genus Wallaceina Bulat, Mokrousov & Podlipaev 1999 [Proteomonas Podlipaev, Frolov & Kolesnikov 1990 non Hill & Wetherbee 1986]
  - Genus Wallacemonas Kostygov & Yurchenko 2014
  - Subfamily Paratrypanosomatinae Votýpka & Lukeš 2013
    - Genus Paratrypanosoma Votypka & Lukes 2013
  - Subfamily Trypanosomatinae
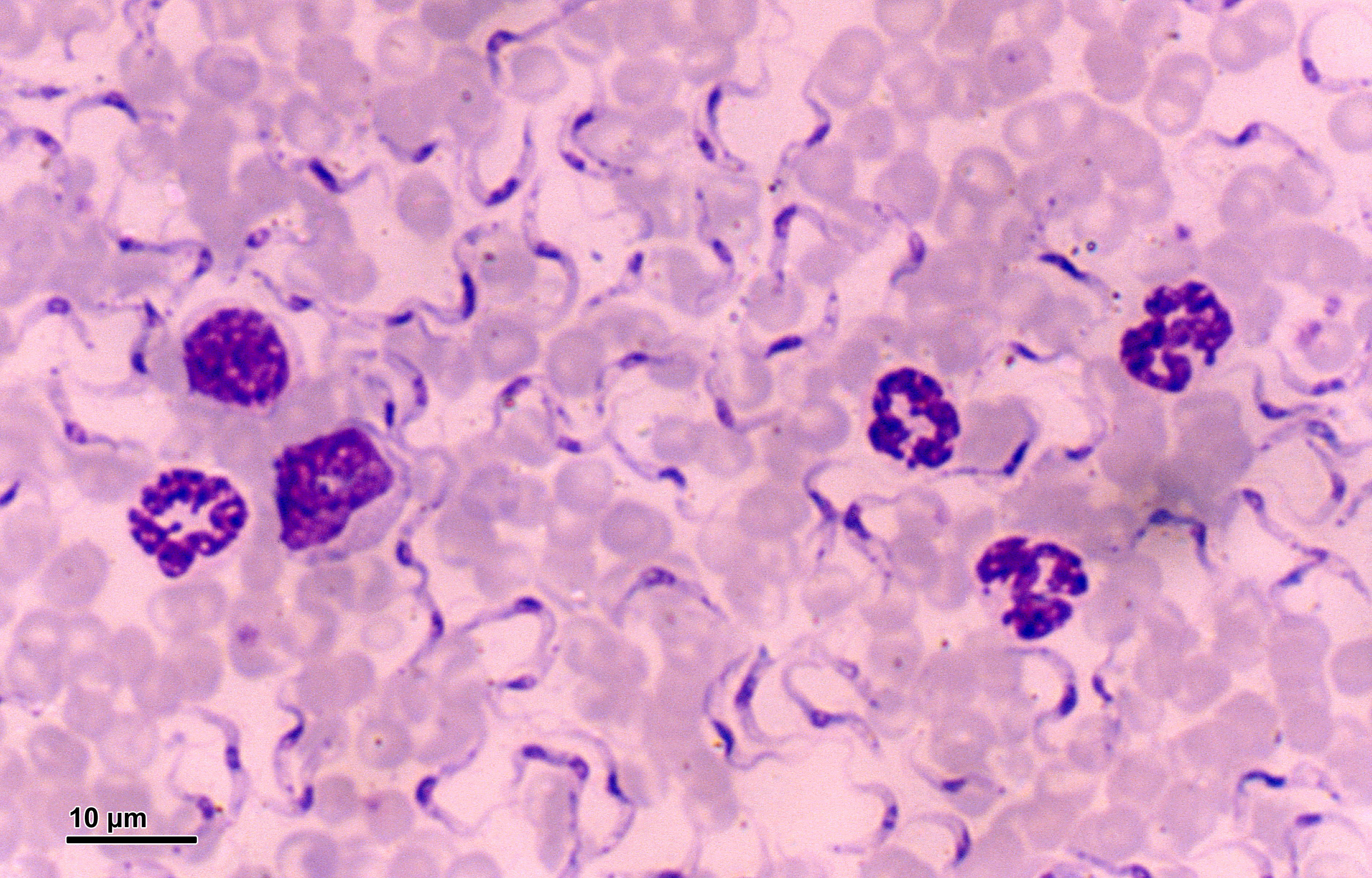
    - Trypanosoma equiperdum
      Genus Trypanosoma Gruby 1843
  - Subfamily Blechomonadinae Votypka & Suková 2013
    - Genus Blechomonas Votypka & Suková 2013
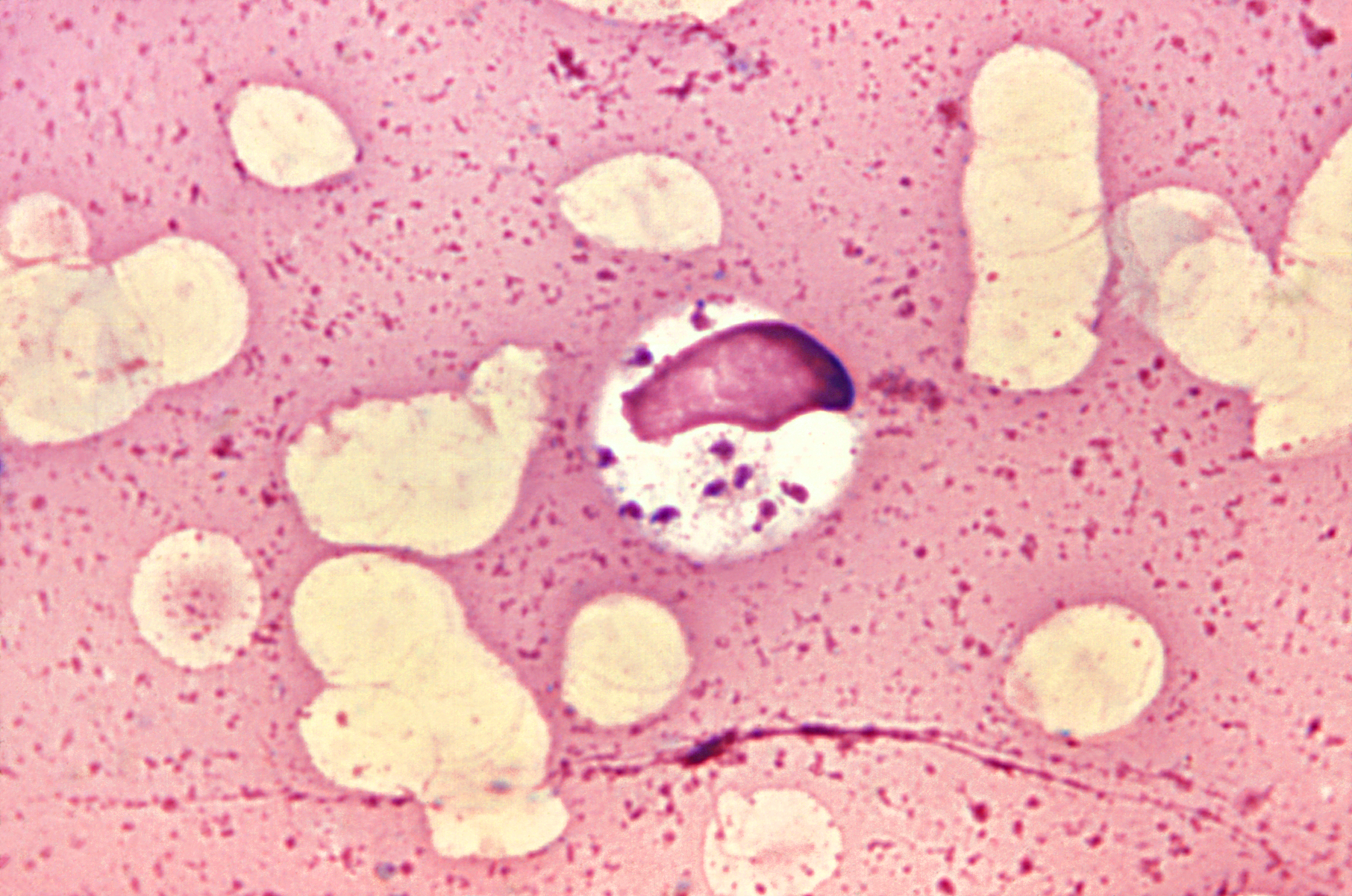
  - Leishmania donovani
    Subfamily Leishmaniinae sensu Maslov & Lukeš 2012
    - Infrafamily Crithidiatae Kostygov & Yurchenko 2017
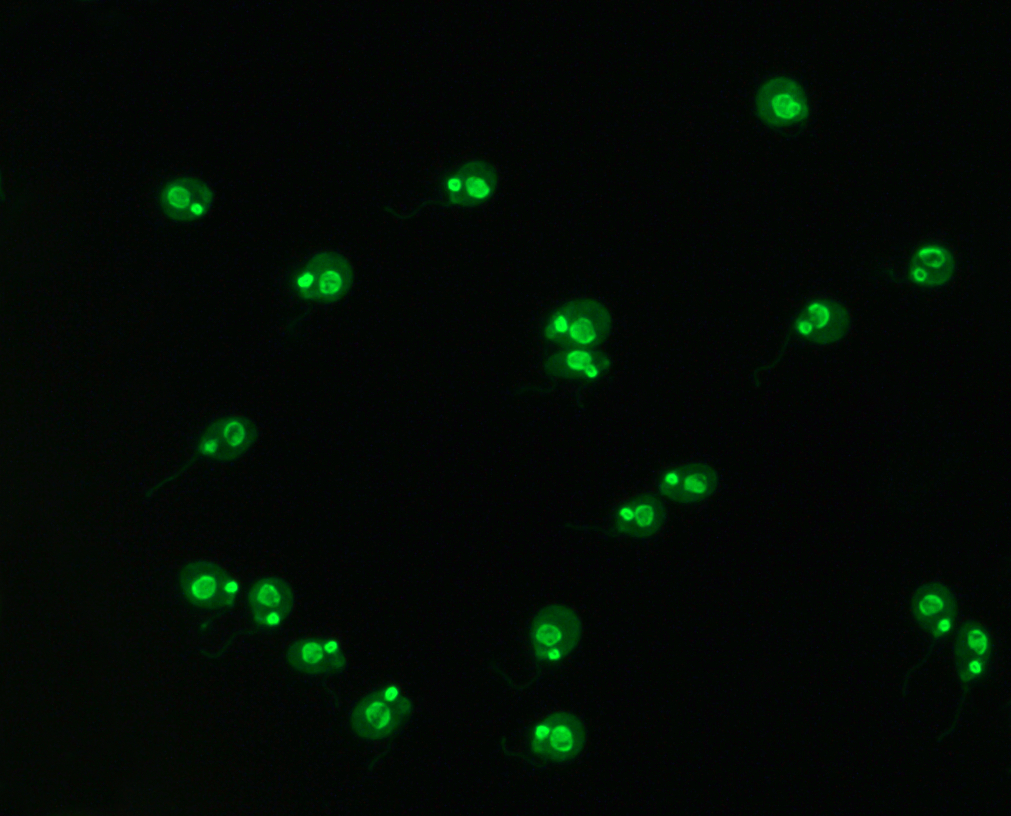
      - Crithidia luciliae
        Genus Crithidia Léger 1902
      - Genus Leptomonas Kent 1880
      - Genus Lotmaria Schwarz 2015
    - Infrafamily Leishmaniatae Maslov & Lukeš 2012
      - Genus Borovskyia Kostygov & Yurchenko 2017
      - Genus Endotrypanum Mesnil & Brimont 1908
      - Genus Leishmania Ross 1903
      - Genus Novymonas Votýpka et al. 2015
      - Genus Paraleishmania Cupolillo et al. 2000
      - Genus Zelonia Shaw, Camargo et Teixeira 2016
  - Subfamily Phytomonadinae Kostygov & Yurchenko 2015
    - Genus Herpetomonas Kent 1880 non Donovan 1909
    - Genus Lafontella Kostygov & Yurchenko 2015
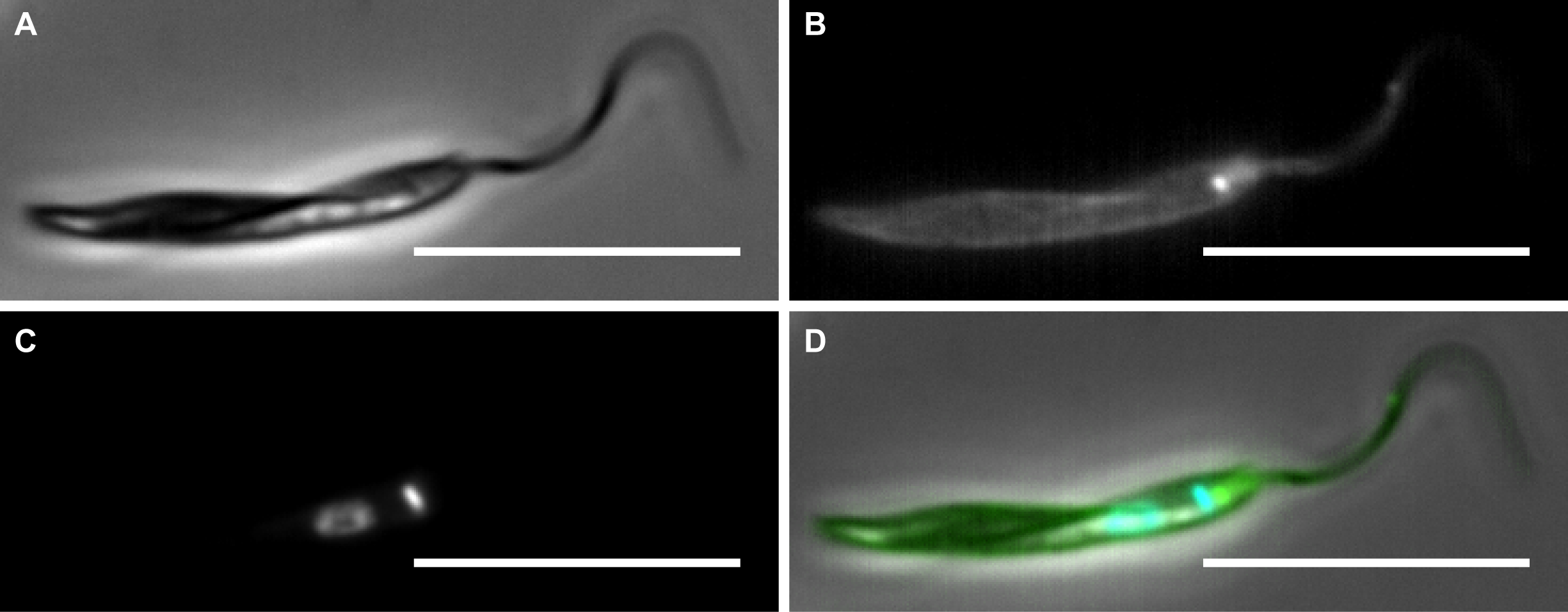
    - Phytomonas serpens
      Genus Phytomonas Donovan 1909
  - Subfamily Strigomonadinae Votypka et al. 2014 – characterised by the presence of obligatory intracellular bacteria of the Kinetoplastibacterium genus.
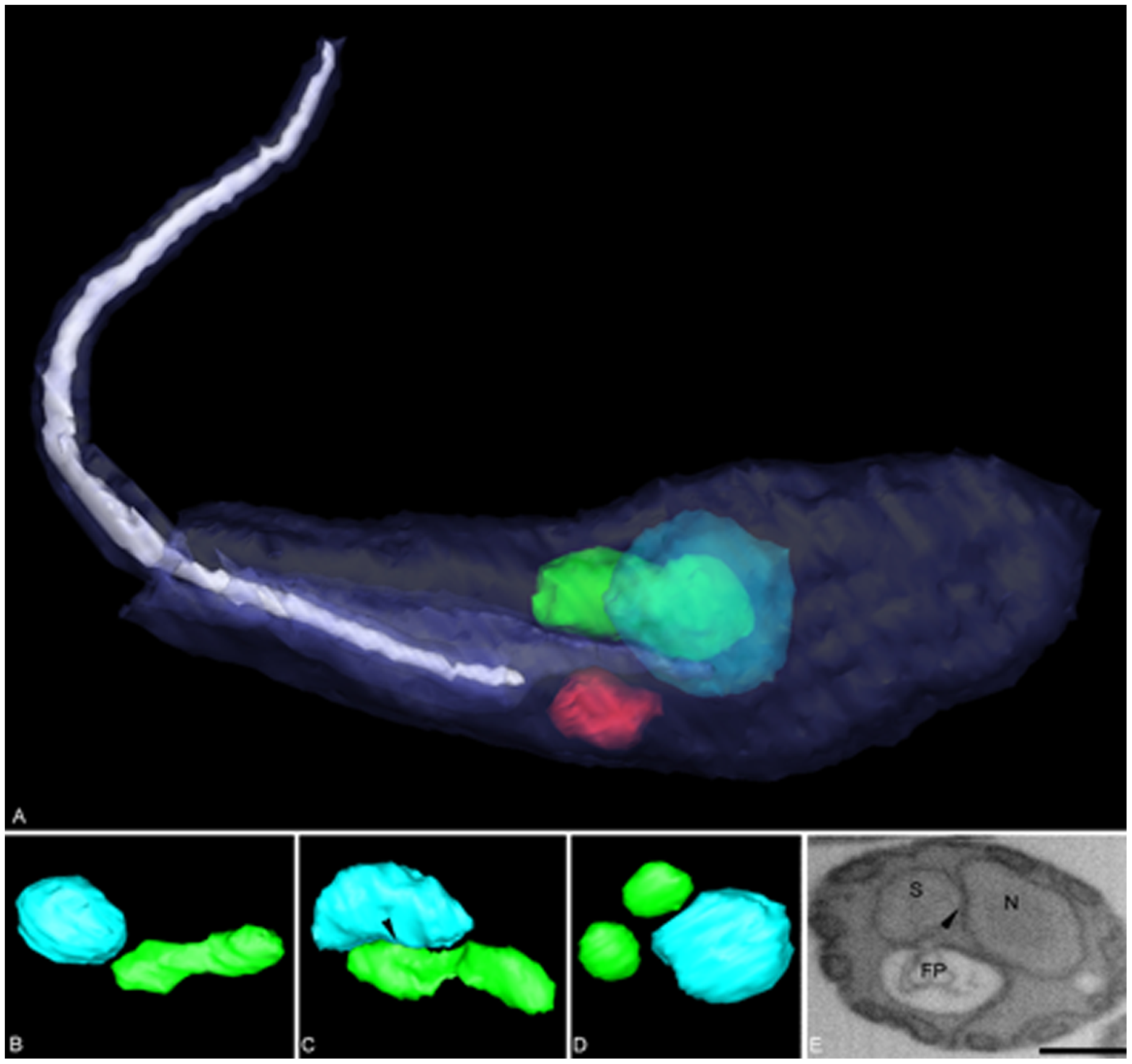
    - Angomonas deanei
      Genus Angomonas Souza & Corte-Real 1991
    - Genus Kentomonas Votypka et al. 2014
    - Genus Strigomonas Lwoff & Lwoff 1931

== Life cycle ==
Some trypanosomatids only occupy a single host, while many others are heteroxenous: they live in more than one host species over their life cycle. This heteroxenous life cycle typically includes the intestine of a bloodsucking insect and the blood and/or tissues of a vertebrate. Rarer hosts include other bloodsucking invertebrates, such as leeches, and other organisms such as plants. Different species go through a range of different morphologies at different stages of the life cycle, with most having at least two different morphologies. Typically the promastigote and epimastigote forms are found in insect hosts, trypomastigote forms in the mammalian bloodstream and amastigotes in intracellular environments.

Among commonly studied examples, T. brucei, T. congolense, and T. vivax are extracellular, while T. cruzi and Leishmania spp. are intracellular. Trypanosomatids with intracellular stages express δ-amastin proteins on their surfaces. de Paiva et al., 2015 illuminates δ-amastins' roles in intracellular success.

=== Sexual reproduction ===
Trypanosomatids that cause globally known diseases such leishmaniasis (Leishmania species), African trypanosomiasis referred to as sleeping sickness (Trypanosoma brucei), and Chagas disease (Trypanosoma cruzi) were found to be capable of meiosis and genetic exchange. These findings indicate the capability for sexual reproduction in the Trypanosomatida.

== Morphologies ==
Six main morphologies

A variety of different morphological forms appear in the life cycles of trypanosomatids, distinguished mainly by the position, length and the cell body attachment of the flagellum. The kinetoplast is found closely associated with the basal body at the base of the flagellum and all species of trypanosomatid have a single nucleus. Most of these morphologies can be found as a life cycle stage in all trypanosomatid genera however certain morphologies are particularly common in a particular genus. The various morphologies were originally named from the genus where the morphology was commonly found, although this terminology is now rarely used because of potential confusion between morphologies and genus. Modern terminology is derived from the Greek; "mastig", meaning whip (referring to the flagellum), and a prefix which indicates the location of the flagellum on the cell. For example, the amastigote (prefix "a-", meaning no flagellum) form is also known as the leishmanial form as all Leishmania have an amastigote life cycle stage.

- Amastigote (leishmanial). Amastigotes are a common morphology during an intracellular lifecycle stage in a mammalian host. All Leishmania have an amastigote stage of the lifecycle. Leishmania amastigotes are particularly small and are among the smallest eukaryotic cells. The flagellum is very short, projecting only slightly beyond the flagellar pocket.
- Promastigote (leptomonad). The promastigote form is a common morphology in the insect host. The flagellum is found anterior of nucleus emerging directly from the anterior cell body. The kinetoplast is located in front of the nucleus, near the anterior end of the body.
- Epimastigote (crithidial). Epimastigotes are a common form in the insect host and Crithidia and Blastocrithidia, both parasites of insects, exhibit this form during their life cycles. The flagellum exits the cell anterior of nucleus and is connected to the cell body for part of its length by an undulating membrane. The kinetoplast is located between the nucleus and the anterior end.
- Trypomastigote (trypanosomal). This stage is characteristic of the genus Trypanosoma in the mammalian host bloodstream as well as infective metacyclic stages in the fly vector. In trypomastigotes the kinetoplast is near the posterior end of the body, and the flagellum lies attached to the cell body for most of its length by an undulating membrane.
- Opisthomastigote (herpetomonad). A rarer morphology where the flagellum posterior of nucleus, passing through a long groove in the cell.
- Endomastigote. A morphotype where the flagellum does not extend beyond the deep flagellar pocket.
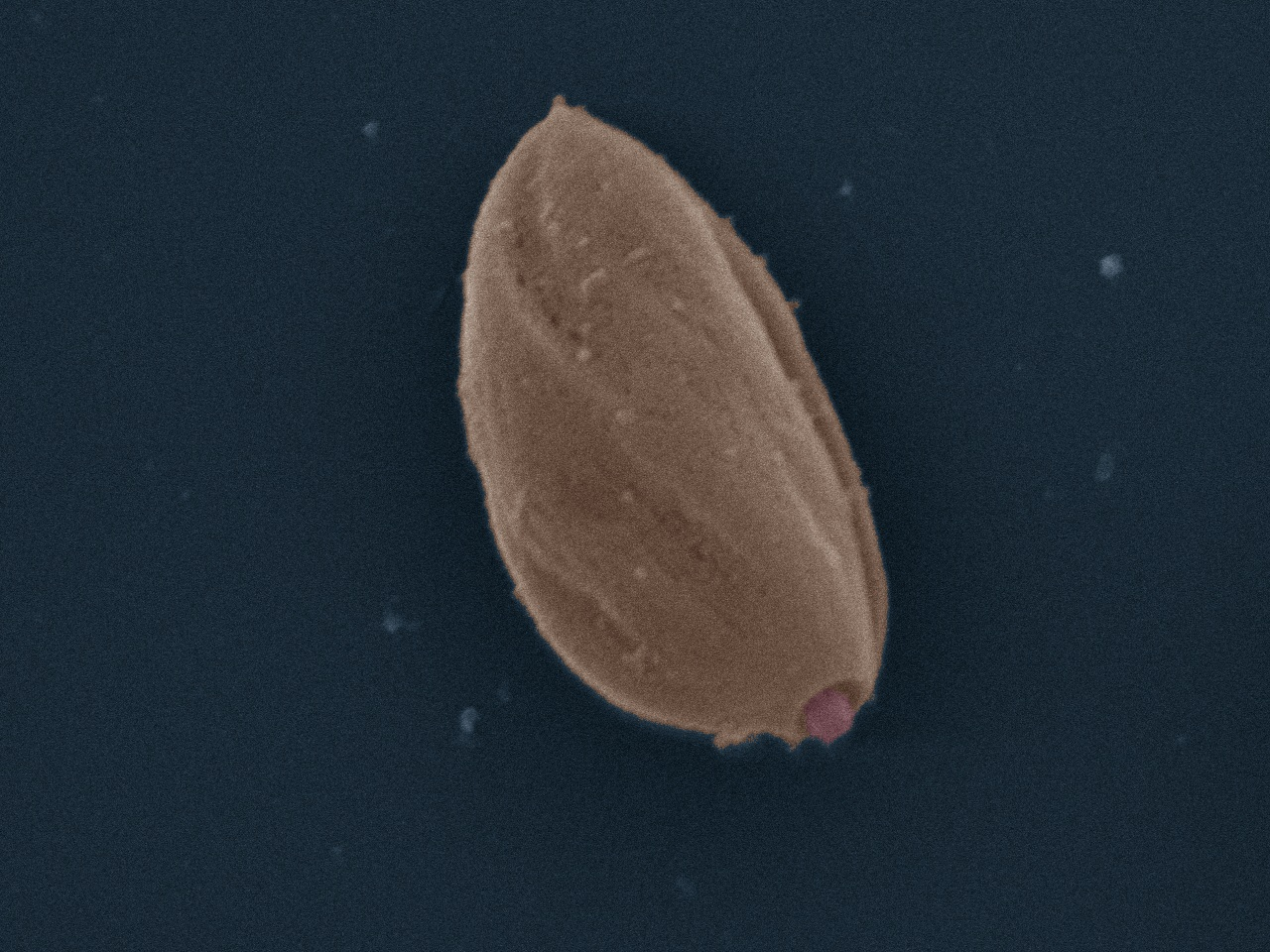
Amastigote: False colour SEM micrograph of amastigote form Leishmania mexicana. The cell body is shown in orange and the flagellum is in red. 219 pixels/μm.

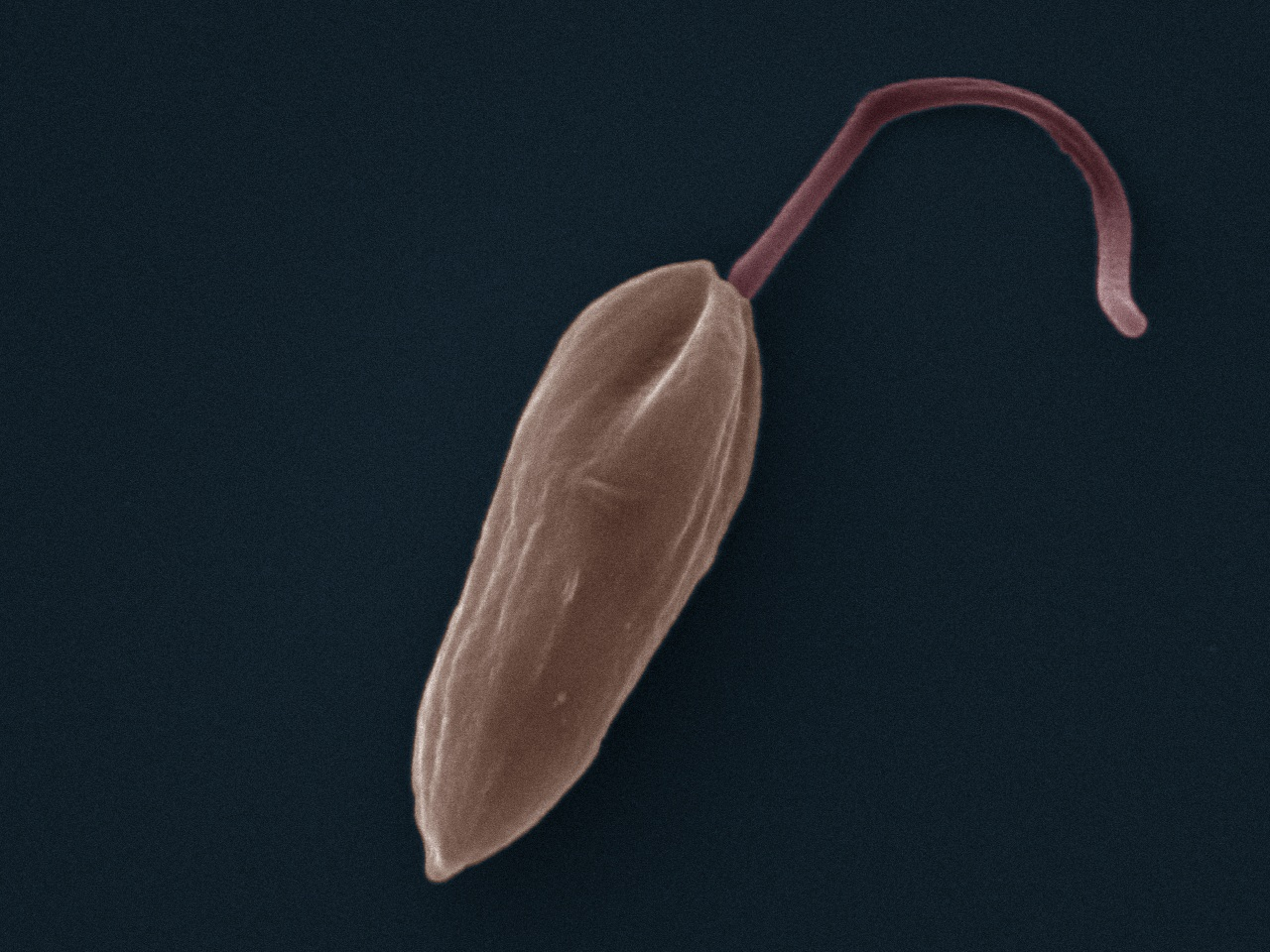
Promastigote: False colour SEM micrograph of promastigote form Leishmania mexicana. The cell body is shown in orange and the flagellum is in red. 119 pixels/μm.

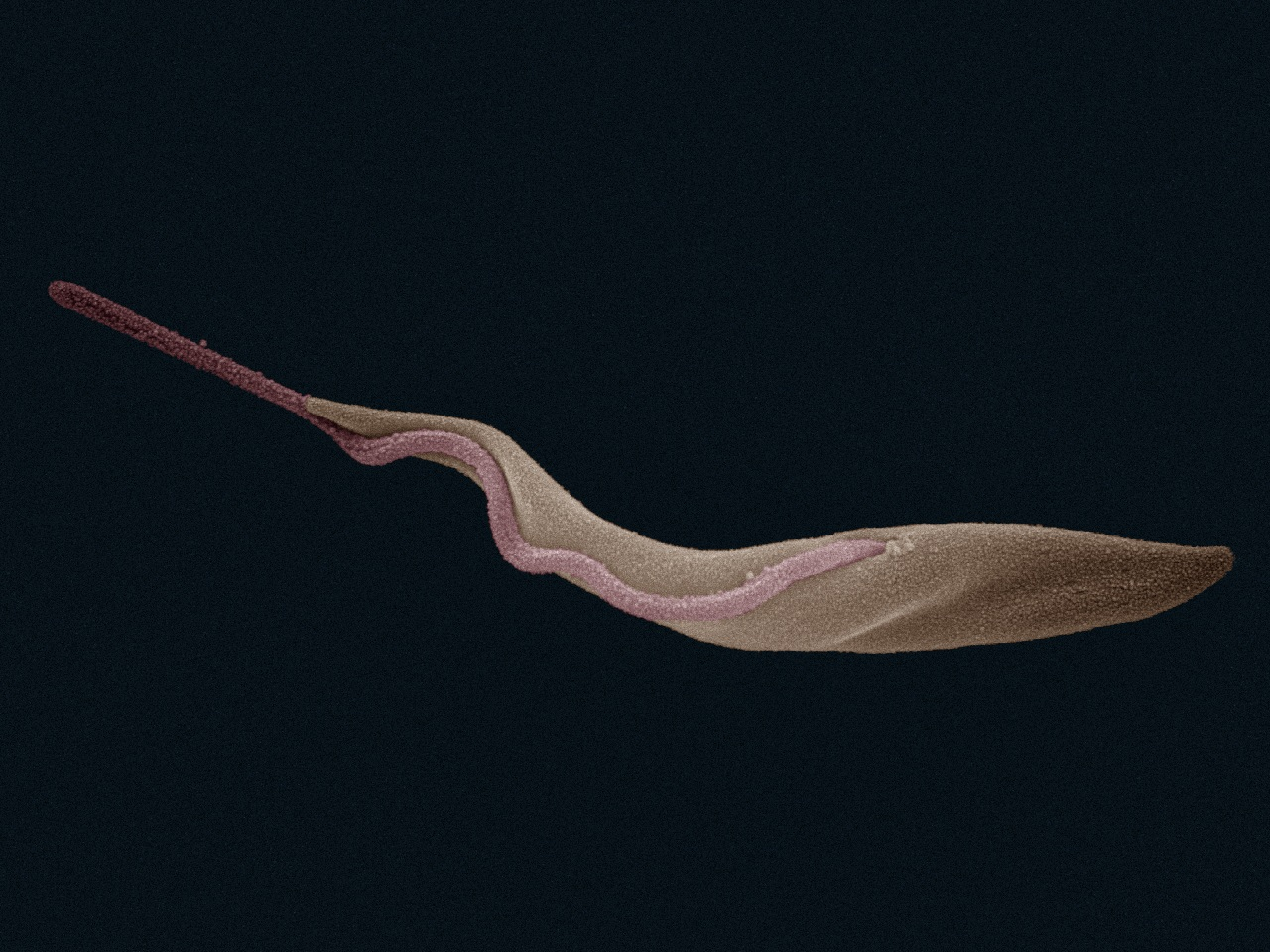
Trypomastigote: False colour SEM micrograph of procyclic form Trypanosoma brucei. The cell body is shown in orange and the flagellum is in red. 84 pixels/μm.

== Other features ==
Notable characteristics of trypanosomatids are the ability to perform trans-splicing of RNA and possession of glycosomes, where much of their glycolysis is confined to. The acidocalcisome, another organelle, was first identified in trypanosomes.

=== Bacterial endosymbiont ===
Kinetoplastibacterium

Scientific classification
- Domain: Bacteria
- Kingdom: Pseudomonadati
- Phylum: Pseudomonadota
- Class: Betaproteobacteria
- Order: Burkholderiales
- Family: Alcaligenaceae
- Genus: Ca. "Kinetoplastibacterium"; Du et al., 1994

Six species of trypanosomatids are known to carry an additional proteobacterial endosymbiont, termed TPE (trypanosomatid proteobacterial endosymbionts). These trypanosomatids (Strigomonas oncopelti, S. culicis, S. galati, Angomonas desouzai, and A. deanei) are in turn known as SHTs, for symbiont-harboring trypanosomatids. All such symbionts have a shared evolutionary origin and are classified in the Candidatus genus "Kinetoplastibacterium".

As with many symbionts, the bacteria have a much reduced genome compared to their free-living relatives of genera Taylorella and Achromobacter. (GTDB finds the genus sister to Proftella, a symbiont of Diaphorina citri.) Reflecting their inability to live alone, they have lost genes dedicated to essential biological functions, relying on the host instead. They have modified their division to become synchronized with the host. In S. culicis at least, the TPE helps the host by synthesizing heme and producing essential enzymes, staying tethered to the kinetoplast.
