= Monoxenous development =

One-host parasitic lifestyle

A monoxenous life cycle: the amoebozoan protist Entamoeba histolytica and its human definitive host.

Monoxenous development, or monoxeny, characterizes a parasite whose development is restricted to a single host species.

The etymology of the terms monoxeny / monoxenous derives from the two ancient Greek words μόνος (mónos), meaning "unique", and ξένος (xénos), meaning "foreign".

In a monoxenous life cycle, the parasitic species may be strictly host specific (using only a single host species, such as gregarines) or not (e.g. Eimeria, Coccidia).
