= Waminoa brickneri =

Scientific classification
- Kingdom: Animalia
- Phylum: Xenacoelomorpha
- Order: Acoela
- Family: Convolutidae
- Genus: Waminoa
- Species: W. brickneri

Binomial name
- Waminoa brickneri (Ogunlana, Hooge, Tekle, Benayahu, Barneah & Tyler, 2005)

Species of acoel

Waminoa brickneri is a species of acoel from the coral reefs around the northern Red Sea and the second described species in the genus (the first is Waminoa litus).

== Characteristics ==
Waminoa brickneri is discoid to obcordate in shape, flat, 3–4 mm in diameter, and 1 mm thick. Its bronze color with small white speckles is derived from the abundant dinoflagellate endosymbionts and the scattered white pigment spots. Two distinct types of dinoflagellate endosymbionts lay scattered throughout the parenchyma of the animal: small symbionts of the genus Symbiodinium and larger symbionts of the genus Amphidinium.

The epidermis is transparent, fully ciliated, and glandulous. The dorsal body wall and lateral sides are especially abundant with rhabdoid glands, while the ventral body wall is abundant with mucous glands; the mucous glands also occur scattered in the dorsal body wall, but there are no rhabdoid glands on the ventral side.

The mouth is ventrally located, somewhere in the posterior third of the body length, and opens directly into the digestive syncytium. Newly hatched juveniles possess a statocyst and paired eyes, but mature individuals lack both. They also lack a frontal organ. The brain is bilobed and lies just beneath the epidermis close behind the anterior tip of the body; the two main masses consist of a central neuropile and nucleated rind and are connected by a short medial commissure.

Like other acoelomorphs, Waminoa brickneri is a simultaneous hermaphrodite. The reproductive organs produce a slightly thickened ridge medially in the terminal quarter of the body. A pair of ventrally situated ovaries extends from about the second quarter of the body length posteriorly behind the mouth. The female pore is prominent and opens to a ciliated vagina located on the ventral body wall immediately anterior to the male gonadopore. Dorsally and laterally to the ovaries lies a pair of testes, which lead posteriorly to the seminal vesicle. The seminal vesicle, which lies just in front of the posterior notch in the body margin, is most prominent and appears white from contained sperm. It is well-developed and walled by thin, loosely concentric muscles and reaches to a penis papilla. Flanking the seminal vesicle are prominent false seminal vesicles continuous with the tracts of sperm descending from the testes. There is a seminal bursa with 2 or more (2–8) bursal nozzles. Sperm cells are elongated and biflagellate.

== Habitat ==
Waminoa brickneri is an epizoic organism living on corals in the Gulf of Aqaba. It occurs in groups of non-overlapping individuals, causing the corals it inhabits to appear spotted. It has been detected on 13 species of stony corals and on one species of soft coral. It can be found at depths of 2 to 50 meters.

The presence of Waminoa species on live corals has brought about several hypotheses about the nature of this coral-acoel association, one of which was that the acoels feed on the coral's mucus. A recent study by Naumann et al. (2010) corroborated this hypothesis.
