= Anaperus =

Anaperus may refer to:

- Anaperus (echinoderm), a genus of echinoderms in the family Cucumariidae
- Anaperus, a synonym for Cogia, a genus of butterflies
- Anaperus, a synonym for Thalassoanaperus, a genus of acoels
