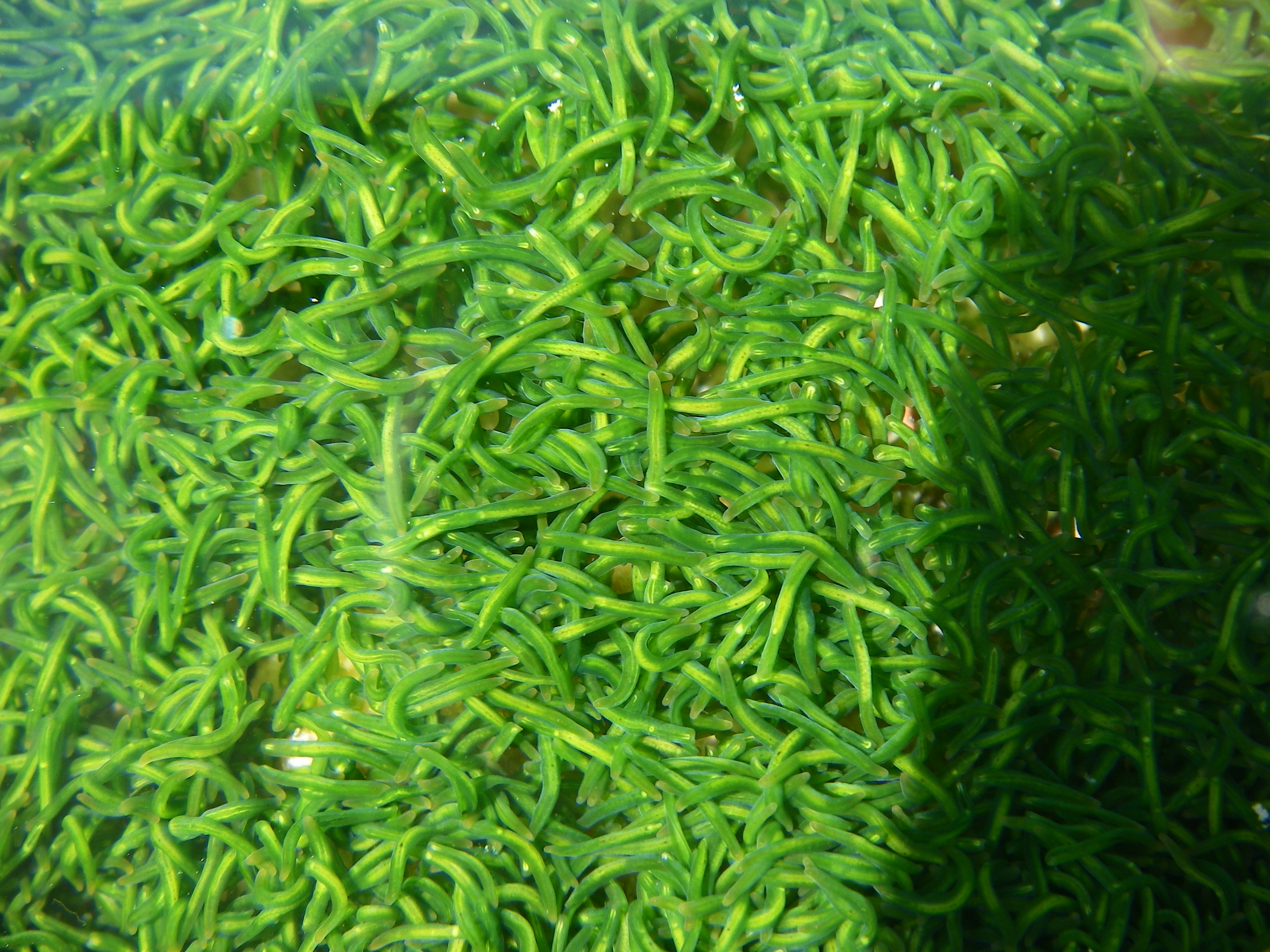

Scientific classification
- Kingdom: Animalia
- Phylum: Xenacoelomorpha
- Order: Acoela
- Family: Convolutidae
- Genus: Symsagittifera
- Species: S. roscoffensis

Binomial name
- Symsagittifera roscoffensis (Graff, 1891)

Synonyms
- Convoluta roscoffensis Graff, 1891

= Symsagittifera roscoffensis =

Species of acoel

Symsagittifera roscoffensis, also called the Roscoff worm, the mint-sauce worm, or the shilly-shally worm, is a marine acoel worm. The origin and nature of the green color of this worm stimulated the intrigued zoologists in the 1870s. It was discovered that the coloring resulted from the symbiosis between the animal and a green micro-alga, the species Tetraselmis convolutae, hosted under its epidermis. It is the photosynthetic activity of the micro-algae in hospite (in the host's body) that provides the essential nutrients for the worm. This partnership is called photosymbiosis, from "photo", "light", and symbiosis, "that which lives with". These photosynthetic marine animals live in colonies (up to several million individuals) in the tidal zone.

== Biology and ecology ==
Although roscoffensis means "who comes from Roscoff", this flatworm is not endemic to Roscoff or North Brittany. Its geographical distribution extends over the Atlantic coast of Europe; colonies were observed from Wales to the south of Portugal.

=== 130 years of history ===
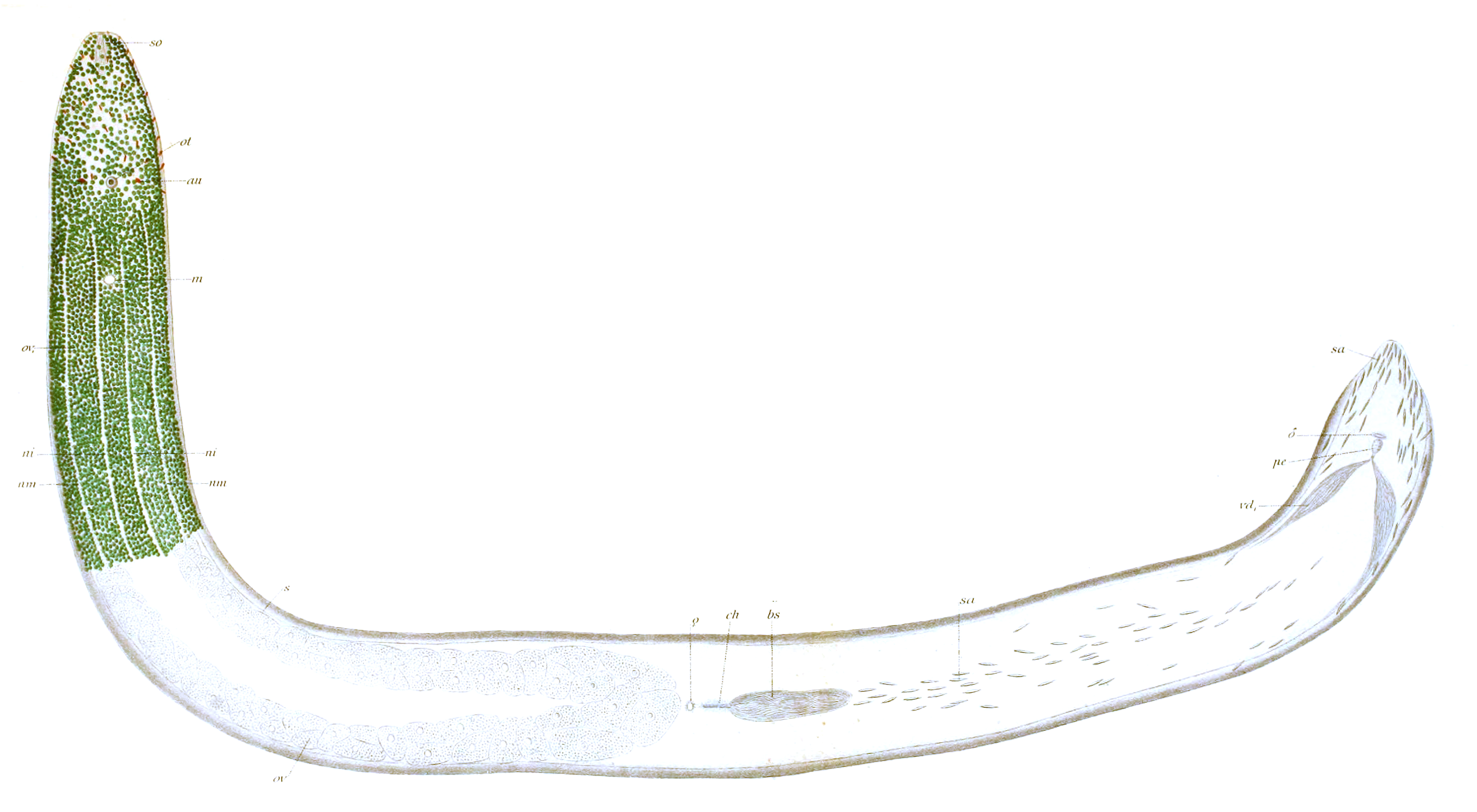
Original painting by Ludwig von Graff

In 1879, at the Station Biologique de Roscoff, founded by Henri de Lacaze-Duthiers, the British biologist Patrick Geddes pondered the nature and origin of the green compound of a local acoel he called Convoluta schultzii. He succinctly described "chlorophyll-containing cells" and the presence of associated starch "as in plant chlorophyll grains".

In 1886, French biologist Yves Delage published a detailed histological study describing (among other things) the nervous system and the sense organs of the same Roscoff acoel, Convoluta schultzii. In this article, Delage also inquired as to "the nature of zoochlorella (i.e., micro-algae): are they real algae? Where do they come from? What are the symbiotic relationships that unite them to their commensal?"

In 1891, Ludwig von Graff, a German zoologist from the University of Graz and a specialist in acoels, undertook a taxonomic redescription of the Roscoff acoel at the Station Biologique de Roscoff. His works highlight a taxonomic confusion in the previous works of Geddes and Delage: "... the researches made in Roscoff and on the Adriatic coasts showed me that the green convoluta of the Adriatic (Convoluta schultzii) ... is specifically different from the green Convoluta of Roscoff. I have preserved for the first one the old name Convoluta schultzii, for the second I give the name of Convoluta roscoffensis." The species name roscoffensis is thus a tribute to the Station Biologique de Roscoff and Henri de Lacaze-Duthiers. In this article, von Graff also writes about zoochlorella (i.e., micro-algae): "Although they undoubtedly derive from algae ... they represent however, in their current state of adaptation, a specific tissue of the worm dedicated to assimilation".

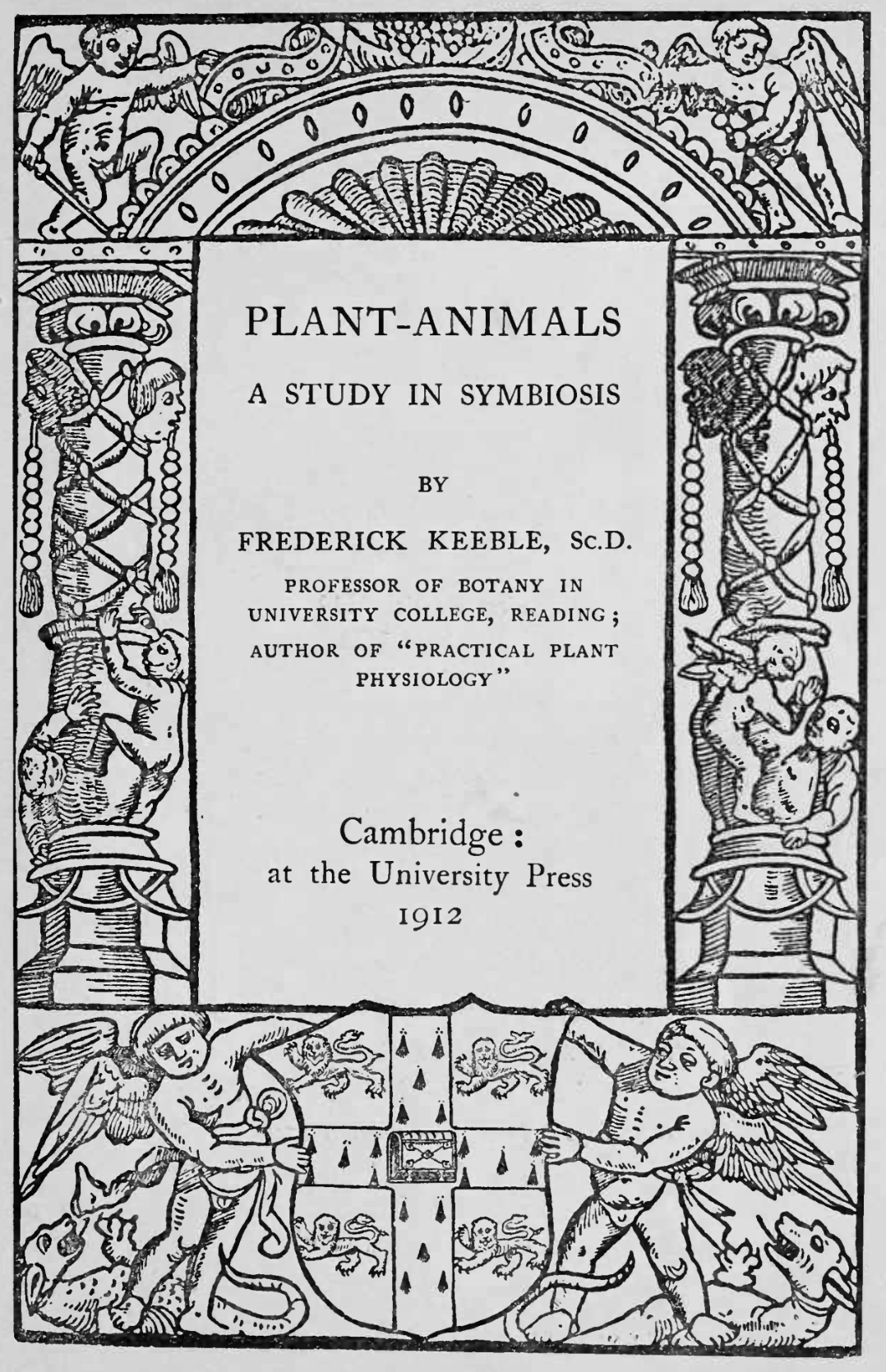
First cover of the book published in 1912 by Keeble on the biology of the partnership Convoluta roscoffensis and its micro-algae

It is in an academic book entitled Plant-Animals published in 1912 by Frederick Keeble, the co-discoverer of the nature and the origin of micro-algae, where a set of works describes the specific relationship between Convoluta roscoffensis and its photosynthetic partners.

The 1960's brought with them a better understanding that called upon emerging electron microscopical techniques. Luigi Provasoli, a pioneering micro-algologist in the art of isolating and cultivating micro-algae, maintained for several years, between 1965 and 1967 in New York (Haskins Laboratories, now in Connecticut), generations of S. roscoffensis directly received from the Station Biologique de Roscoff. Thus, generations of non-symbiotic juveniles were born in New York and were used to test the specificity of association between S. roscoffensis and different species of microalgae. A century after its formal description, in 1991, thanks to the techniques of molecular biology and the emerging tools of bioinformatics, the phylogeny of acoela was revisited and modified: the green Convoluta of Roscoff, Convoluta roscoffensis, became Symsagittifera roscoffensis, the "Roscoff worm".

==== Biotope and ethology ====
Symsagittifera roscoffensis lives in the tidal balancing zone, preferentially in a sandy substrate, poor in organic matter. The accumulation of the latter generates reduced, hypoxic, or anoxic conditions, which promote the development of anaerobic bacteria releasing compounds such as hydrogen sulfide (H_{2}S) incompatible with the oxygen requirements of the worm.

Circatidal rhythms (dynamic alternation of high and low tides) influence the behavior of these animals that migrate vertically at each tide: at rising tide, the colonies sink into the sand, they rise to the surface at the beginning of the ebb tide, and become visible in the interstitial seawater flowing. Sand particle size is an important factor because it determines the ease of vertical movements of the worms. The latter always remain in contact with seawater when the interstitial flows dry up during the ebb tide and are also protected (buried in the sand) at rising tide, from the dispersive effects of the waves.

The colonies are located on the upper part of the foreshore, which is the least long-term covered layer of water during the tidal cycle. Colonies of S. roscoffensis are therefore in this place theoretically exposed to the longest light exposure to maximize the photosynthetic activity of micro-algae partners. Light is an essential biotic factor since the photosynthetic activity of algae in hospite is the only contribution to nutrient intake for the animals.

The works of Louis Martin refer to the presence of S. roscoffensis in the interstitial seawater flows at low tide nights, showing a bright reflection of the Sun on the Moon. The latter has also shown that the worms, captive in the laboratory, gather mostly on the surface of the container when the tide is low and migrate to the bottom when the tide is high. In the thermo and photo-regulated chambers where the worms do not physically perceive the rising or falling tide, this vertical oscillation persists for 4 to 5 days and is then gradually lost and evolves into a random occupation of the space in the container.

Another movement characteristic of the species, sometimes observed in puddles of seawater and in the laboratory, brings together hundreds or even thousands of individuals to realize a circular procession. Modeling work shows that this social behavior is self-organized and is initiated by the movement of an individual who drives the worms to its proximity, thereby propagating the movement to an increasing density of worms that move in a coordinated way. Symsagittifera roscoffensis is thus a model for studying and understanding how individual behavior can lead to collective behavior.

As early as 1924, zoologists observed the behavior of S. roscoffensis in response to the acidification of its environment. After forced diffusion of CO_{2} (carbon dioxide) gas into seawater, the dissolved CO_{2} concentration increases until the medium is saturated and generates carbonic acid and releases an H^{+} ion (CO_{2} + H_{2}O ⇔ H^{+} + HCO_{3}^{–}). The increase in H^{+} ions causes a decrease in pH and, therefore, an increase in acidity. Under the effect of the abrupt and pronounced decrease in pH, S. roscoffensis contracts, turns on itself, and then gradually expels its algal partners. The worm gradually loses its green color and usually dies after a few hours. This experience mimics the effects of ocean acidification, which is today the major consequence (with the rise in temperatures) of anthropogenic activities, particularly the combustion of fossil fuels, which generates very high concentrations of CO_{2}. This photosymbiotic system, "S.roscoffensis/T. convolutae," allows us to explore and evaluate the effect of acidification on oceanic photosymbiotic species, the most emblematic of which are corals. Coral bleaching, which results mainly from the rise in ocean temperature but is aggravated by acidification, results in the dissociation of the algae/animal partnership, leading to the expulsion of the algae. Although it may be reversible, bleaching is a direct illustration of the environmental changes that are threatening more coral reefs and the many associated species.

=== Anatomy of the adult and reproduction of the species ===
The adult worm is about 4 to 5 mm long. In the anterior part (the head), there is a statocyst or otolith: a gravity-sensor that allows the worm to orient itself in space and to show a negative geotropism (a mechanical stimulus against the wall of a tube containing worms triggers their active dive to the bottom of the tube).

The worm has two photoreceptors flanking the statocyst: the perception of light allows the worm to move towards illuminated environments; one speaks of positive phototropism. This adaptation likely maximizes the probability of encounter between the free microalga and the non-symbiotic juvenile, which also presents this positive phototropism. S. roscoffensis, exposed to different light intensities, tends to move and expose itself to higher intensities than those at which free micro-algae perform optimal photosynthesis. Other works have shown experimentally that if it has the choice, the photosymbiotic worm avoids exposing itself to extreme light conditions: either too weak or too strong. In its environment, it is suspected that a temporary burial allows it to escape from too strong intensities (photoinhibition).

This worm has a central (brain) and a peripheral nervous system. When one amputates the anterior part ("the head" containing the brain), one can observe a capacity of regeneration of the whole central nervous system in about twenty days with a joint recovery of the normal behavior. However, the different biological functions are not regenerated at the same speed: if the phototropism, which is associated with the regeneration of the photoreceptors, is recovered quickly, the geotropism, which is associated with the regeneration of the statocyst, is not recovered for several weeks.

S. roscoffensis does not have a circulatory blood system: the diffusion of oxygen through the tissues is passive. Part of this oxygen also comes from the photosynthetic activity of the in-hospite algae.

The surface of the animal is abundantly ciliated and strewn with numerous mucus-secreting glands. Mucus provides a physical network allowing the worms to move in the crevices of seawater. An in-depth study on the behavior of S. roscoffensis in situ explains that the only possibility for the worm to move horizontally is to make a support (invisible to the naked eye), which is nothing other than a matrix synthesized from secreted mucus. The animals do not slide directly on the sand but "give the impression of sliding on an invisible surface".

The author of this study hypothesized that animals, moving "above" the sandy substrate, would also receive more light by reflecting light rays, taking advantage of more photosynthesis and hence nutrient transfer for the worm.

Secreted mucus is also an interface (biofilm) between the animal and its environment. Specific bacterial populations develop and appear to be hosted in the mucus, being hence intimately involved in the worm biology.

This triptych (animal + micro-algae + bacterial consortium) is a good example of the Holobiont paradigm that explains that an organism (animal or plant) is a complex and dynamic association involving microbial populations necessary for development, growth, and, to some extent, for the life of the organism.

S. roscoffensis does not have a digestive system at any time during its development. However, on its ventral side, there is an orifice considered as "a mouth" which allows it to ingest (without digesting) the micro-algae Tetraselmis convolutae. The latter gives access to a digestive syncytium through which the future micro-algae in hospite is first vacuolated (it loses its flagella and its theca), then transits to be finally located under the epidermis of the animal without being internalized in the cells but in contact and between the cells of the worm.

Symsagittifera roscoffensis also has a muscular system consisting of a complex network of transversal, longitudinal, circular, and dorsal-ventral muscle fibers.

This worm is a hermaphrodite but does not self-fertilize; it must mate with a partner to reproduce. Mature spermatozoa are produced at the posterior end of the animal. The oocytes are fertilized by the spermatozoa of the partners, who are stored, after mating, in a spermatheca. This spermatheca is connected to the oocytes by one canal. Each gravid individual will produce from the mucus that it secretes abundantly a transparent cocoon in which are released the fertilized oocytes. Embryos, whose number varies and can reach twenty, develop synchronously. In the laboratory and depending on the rearing conditions, after 4 to 5 days, the juveniles hatch, escape from the cocoon, and begin their quest for the photosynthetic partner. If the micro-algae are not ingested, the non-symbiotic juveniles in the laboratory die after about 20 days.

=== Phylogeny: incertae sedis? ===
In 1886, Yves Delage wondered about the simplicity of the acoela body plan organization: is it the consequence of a loss, of regressions of characters during the evolution, or do the acoels preserve, for certain characters, an ancestral body plan organization? The flatworms were first assimilated into Turbellaria within the phylum Platyhelminthes, mainly based on morphological resemblances. After numerous phylogenetic and phylogenomic studies, these acoela worms were placed within the subphylum Acoelomorpha, phylum Xenacoelomorpha.

The phylogenetic position of the acoela is unstable and has been the subject of much discussion: arguments place them at the base of the bilaterians, before the deuterostomia/protostomia dichotomy, while others place them rather at the base of deuterostomia. Regardless of their phylogenetic position within metazoans, acoela may have retained some ancestral traits of bilaterians during evolution and thus represent an object of study that would potentially help to better understand the diversification of body plan organization in animals with bilateral symmetry.

== The photosynthetic partner and the modus vivendi between the animal and the microalgae ==
=== Discovery and characteristics of the partner microalgae ===
Neither Geddes (1879), who observed the presence of starch and chlorophyll in the green cells present in the tissues, nor Delage (1886) and Haberlandt (1891) had formally been able to identify their origin and nature; however, suspecting micro-algae.

In 1901, in Roscoff, William Gamble and Frederick Keeble began to study these green cells in hospite and tried to isolate them and put them into cultivation, with no success. In 1905, they observed non-symbiotic juveniles that were greening as they had hatched from cocoons, originally laid in unfiltered seawater, but transferred and incubated in filtered seawater. They hypothesized that the factor infecting juveniles and conferring the green color was probably on the surface or inside the cocoon.

In a second experiment, they removed empty cocoons (post-hatching) initially contained in unfiltered seawater and then transferred and incubated them in filtered seawater. After 3 weeks, they observed in the filtered seawater a greening of these cocoons and the accumulation of green and flagellated unicellular organisms. This experiment allowed them to isolate these green microorganisms. The microscopic observations of these cells showed characteristics of the micro-algae, showing (among other things) the presence of a violet color after treatment with iodine, revealing the presence of starch, and diagnosis of photosynthetic activity. The contact between non-symbiotic juveniles, reared under sterile conditions, with these flagellate green cells allowed to induce photosymbiosis: these founding works demonstrated that the green cells in hospite were in fact flagellated microalgae in the free-living state and that they were the "infective" factor causing the green coloration of adults (absent in non-symbiotic juveniles). Thus, there is no vertical transmission of the symbionts (transmitted by the parents) but a horizontal acquisition at each new generation (i.e., the symbionts are in the environment).

Tetraselmis convolutae belongs to the class Chlorodendrophyceae within the division Chlorophyta. This alga has remarkable characteristics, including four flagella, a theca (polysaccharide envelope), and a vacuole (stigma or "eyespot") that contains photo-receptor molecules. T. convolutae lives in the free-living state in the water column but is mainly benthic. Thus, in hospite, the alga does not have the same phenotype as in the free-living state: it no longer has its flagella, its theca and stigma. These phenotypical differences did not allow Geddes, Delage, and Haberlandt to deduce that the green cells in the tissues could have been microalgae.

=== Modus vivendi: a highly integrated partnership—not only additive ===
Few works describe the trophic nature of the exchanges between the animal and its photosynthetic partners. The photosynthetic activity provides, in addition to oxygen, various organic compounds: amino acids, proteins, polysaccharides, and fatty acids. The photosynthetic partner is estimated to provide S. roscoffensis with 174% body C d^{−1} ind^{−1}.

Micro-algae recycle uric acid (coming from the worm's nitrogen metabolism) for the synthesis of their amino acids/proteins. The assimilation of uric acid by S. roscoffensis has attracted the attention of early experimenters, including Louis Destouches, aka Louis Ferdinand Céline, who carried out work on the physiology of these animals and who concluded in 1920, "that it is therefore very likely that symbiotic exchanges lead to the transformation of uric acid into nitrogenous food for zoochlorella". Douglas has formally shown that endogenous uric acid from the worm (derived from its metabolism) is a source of nitrogen for micro-algae and that non-symbiotic juveniles contain uric acid crystals that disappear 15 to 20 days after the establishment of symbiosis. However, the author proposes that if exogenous uric acid is not used by the worm, and if its concentration in the medium culture decreases over time, it is because of a bacterial activity associated with the animals.

Near resurgences rich in nitrate, in intertidal areas, where S. roscoffensis worms are able to assimilate significant amounts of nitrate depending on the exposure and intensity of light. This quantity is ten times greater than that absorbed by the alga in the free-living state. So, S. roscoffensis could be a major nitrate interceptor.

In the tissues of the animal, the micro-algae produce a sulfur compound, DMSP (dimethylsulfoniopropionate), which also diffuses into the environment. This compound is generally degraded enzymatically by DMSP-lyases to acrylic acid and DMS (Dimethyl sulfide). However, no DMSP-lyase activity was measured in cultures of Tetraselmis convolutae alone. Bacterial DMSP-lyase activity has been hypothesized to explain the presence of DMS and acrylic acid in colonies of S. roscoffensis. Likely, S. roscoffensis mucus (such as the mucus of other photosymbiotic animals, such as corals) harbors specific bacterial populations expressing DMSP-lyases. DMSP is a sulfur compound that exhibits, among other things, a repellent property that could confer a chemical barrier, explaining the absence of known or observed predators and, consequently, the abundance of worms within colonies.

== See also ==
- Climate change
- Marine biodiversity
