= Peridinin-chlorophyll-protein complex =

Peridinin-chlorophyll A binding protein
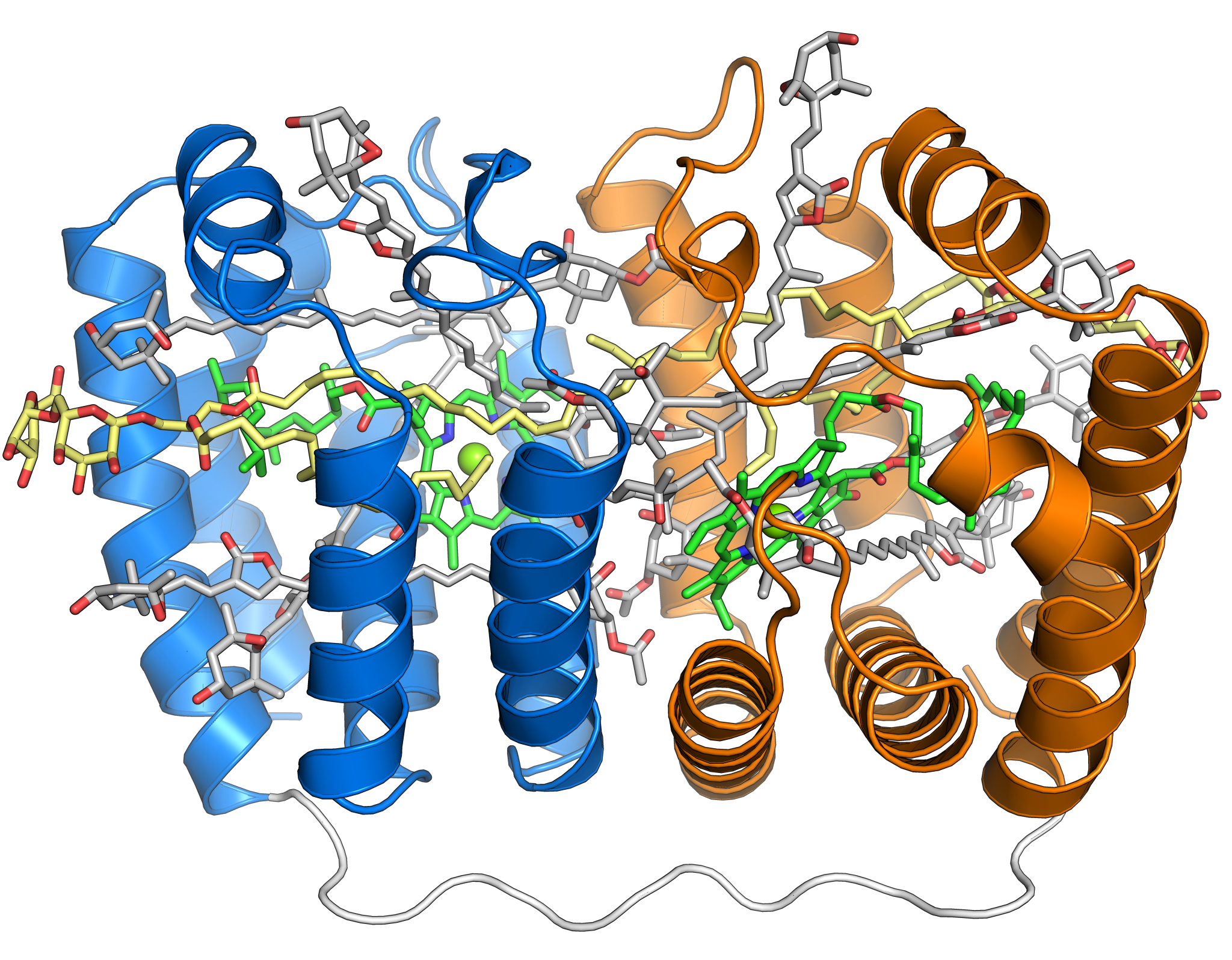
- Crystal structure of the soluble peridinin-chlorophyll-protein complex from the photosynthetic dinoflagellate Amphidinium carterae. This complex is found in many photosynthetic dinoflagellates and involves a boat or cradle-shaped protein with two pseudosymmetrical repeats of eight alpha helices (shown in blue and orange) wrapped around a pigment-filled central cavity. Each eight-helix segment binds one chlorophyll molecule (green, with central magnesium ion shown as a green sphere), one diacylglycerol molecule (yellow) and four peridinin molecules (gray).

Identifiers
- Symbol: PCP
- Pfam: PF02429
- InterPro: IPR003376
- SCOP2: 1ppr / SCOPe / SUPFAM
Available protein structures:
- Pfam: structures / ECOD
- PDB: RCSB PDB; PDBe; PDBj
- PDBsum: structure summary

The peridinin-chlorophyll-protein complex (PCP or PerCP) is a soluble molecular complex consisting of the peridinin-chlorophyll a-protein bound to peridinin, chlorophyll, and lipids. The peridinin molecules absorb light in the blue-green wavelengths (470 to 550 nm) and transfer energy to the chlorophyll molecules with extremely high efficiency. PCP complexes are found in many photosynthetic dinoflagellates, in which they may be the primary light-harvesting complexes.

== Structure ==
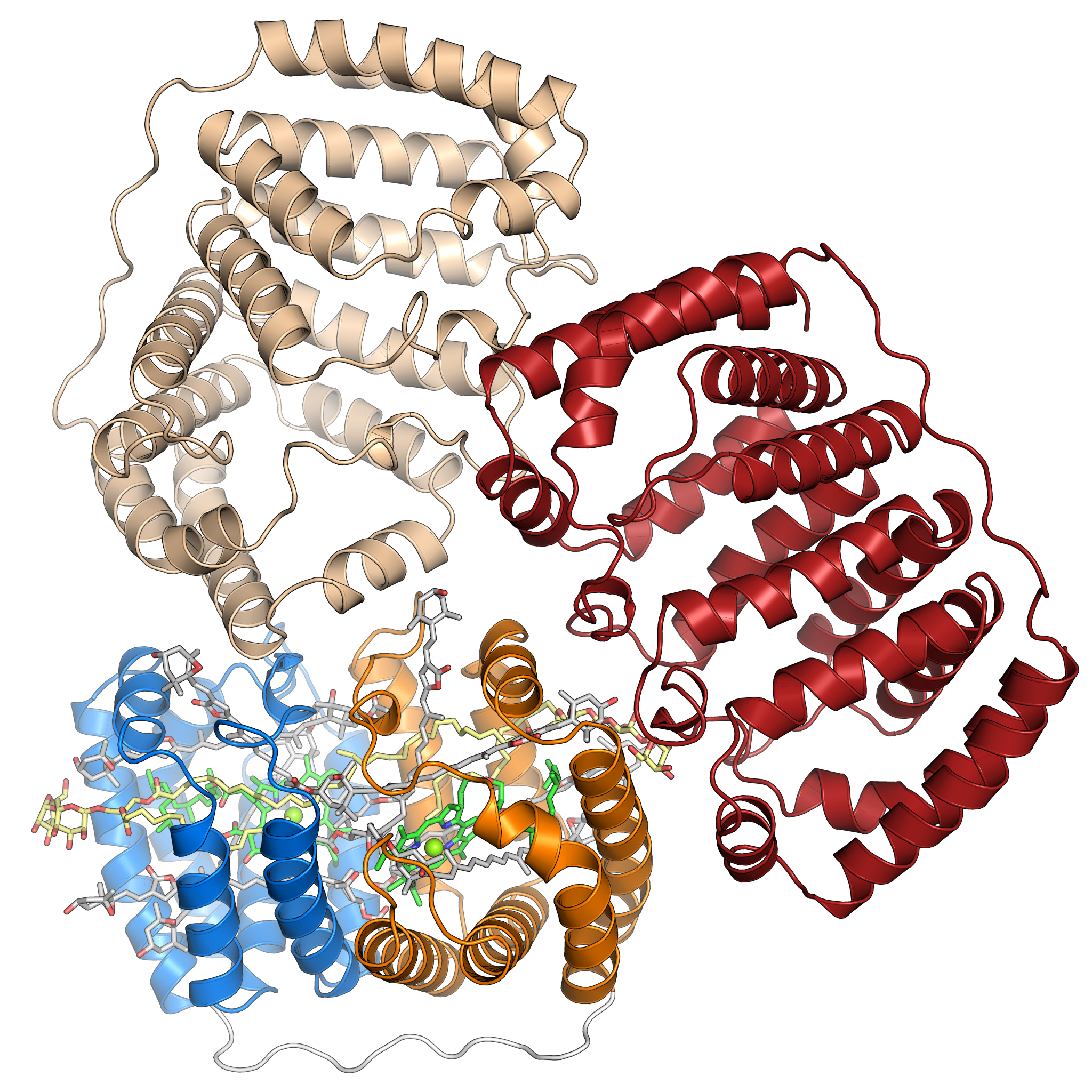
The noncrystallographic trimer thought to be the biologically functional state of the A. carterae PCP complex. The lower left monomer is shown with pigments and lipids and is colored to indicate the pseudosymmetrical repeat; for the other two monomers, only the protein is shown, in tan and red.

The PCP protein has been identified in dinoflagellate genomes in at least two forms, a homodimeric form composed of two 15-kD monomers, and a monomeric form of around 32kD believed to have evolved from the homodimeric form via gene duplication. The monomeric form consists of two pseudosymmetrical eight-helix domains in which the helices are packed in a complex topology resembling that of the beta sheets in a jelly roll fold. The three-dimensional arrangement of helices forms a boat-shaped molecule with a large central cavity in which the pigments and lipids are bound. Each eight-helix segment typically binds four peridinin molecules, one chlorophyll a molecule, and one lipid molecule such as digalactosyl diacyl glycerol; however, this stoichiometry varies among species and among PCP isoforms. The most common 4:1 peridinin:chlorophyll ratio was predicted by spectroscopy in the 1970s, but was unconfirmed until the crystal structure of the Amphidinium carterae PCP complex was solved in the 1990s. Whether formed from a protein monomer or dimer, the assembled protein-pigment complex is sometimes known as bPCP (for "building block") and is the minimal stable unit. In at least some PCP forms, including that from A. carterae, these building blocks assemble into a trimer thought to be the biologically functional state.

When the X-ray crystallography structure of PCP was solved in 1997, it represented a novel protein fold, and its topology remains unique among known proteins. The structure is referred to by the CATH database, which systematically classifies protein structures, as an "alpha solenoid" fold; however, elsewhere in the literature the term alpha solenoid is used for open and less compact helical protein structures.

== Function ==
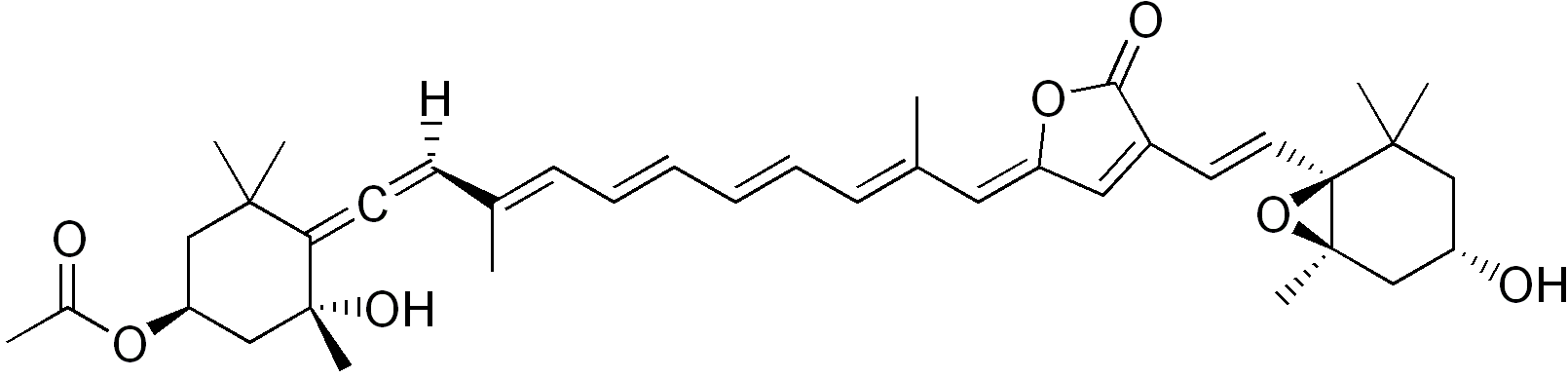
A single peridinin molecule.

Photosynthetic dinoflagellates contain membrane-bound light-harvesting complexes similar to those found in green plants. They additionally contain water-soluble protein-pigment complexes that exploit carotenoids such as peridinin to extend their photosynthetic capacity. Peridinin absorbs light in the blue-green wavelengths (470 to 550 nm) which are inaccessible to chlorophyll by itself; instead the PCP complex uses the geometry of the relative pigment orientations to effect extremely high-efficiency energy transfer from the peridinin molecules to their neighboring chlorophyll molecule. PCP has served as a common model system for spectroscopy and for theoretical calculations relating to the protein's photophysics.

PCP complexes are thought to occupy the thylakoid lumen. After energy transfer from the peridinin to the chlorophyll pigment, PCP complexes are believed to then transfer energy from the excited chlorophyll to membrane-bound light harvesting complexes.
