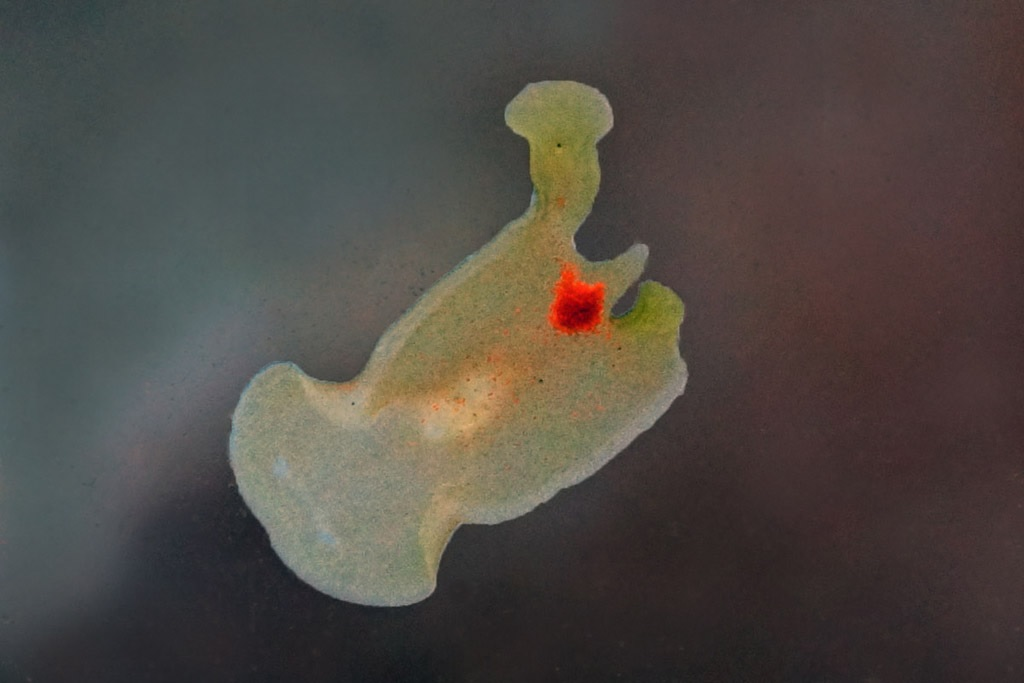

Scientific classification
- Kingdom: Animalia
- Phylum: Xenacoelomorpha
- Order: Acoela
- Family: Convolutidae
- Genus: Convolutriloba; Hendelberg & Akesson, 1988

Type species
- Convolutriloba longifissura

= Convolutriloba =

Genus of acoels

Convolutriloba is a genus of marine acoels.

They possess shield-shaped bodies with a rounded anterior and three caudal lobes, though the number may vary in mature individuals. They may have an indentation on each side of the body near the anterior end. They usually are a few millimeters to a centimeter in length and under a millimeter thick. Though they have muscles throughout their body, they move using cilia to glide.

They have symbiotic algae that give them a green or brown colour. They also prey on small crustacean larvae like Artemia and copepods. However, they cannot survive for long periods in the dark, even if they are fed. The mouth is located on the ventral surface. When feeding, they raise their front ends and fold the lateral edges of their body downward, forming a funnel. Prey are trapped by lowering the body onto them.

Individuals are hermaphrodites. They reproduce both sexually and asexually. They have captured scientific interest because of the various ways of agametic asexual reproduction. During budding or architomy, the offspring separate from the body by attaching to the substrate and tearing away. The offspring produced by sexual reproduction lack the symbiotic algae and will die unless they can pick them up within a few weeks.

Like all members of the family Sagittiferidae, they possess sagittocysts on their skin. Sagittocysts are needle-like bodies 18-50 μm long that contain some secretory product. They can be extruded from the body by an associated muscle. They are believed to play a role in defence and prey capture. Ultrastructurally, they have a vesicular core surrounded by a mesh of actin filaments.

Due to their rapid growth in well-lit aquariums, they are considered pests.

== Systematics ==
- Convolutriloba hastifera (Winsor, 1990): The only species discovered naturally - the other three were discovered in aquaria. This species undergoes transverse fission (architomy) near the caudal end, with a relatively undifferentiated fragment of the animal tearing away by holding onto the substrate. The smaller fragment produced by the fission grows a new head and begins moving around in a few days.
- Convolutriloba longifissura (Bartolomaeus & Balzer, 1997): Asexual reproduction in this species occurs by architomy of the caudal end to give a small butterfly-shaped piece. This piece splits longitudinally to give two daughter organisms. Thus, at the end of each cycle, three new individuals are formed.
- Convolutriloba macropyga (Shannon & Achatz, 2007): This species is green in colour and has a pair of indentations on either side of the head. Asexual reproduction occurs by the formation of buds facing away from the head at the caudal ends.
- Convolutriloba retrogemma (Hendelberg & Akesson, 1988): Asexual reproduction occurs by the formation of buds from the caudal lobes. The body axis of these buds faces away from that of the mother. This results in an individual with one or more extra heads at the tips of the tails.
