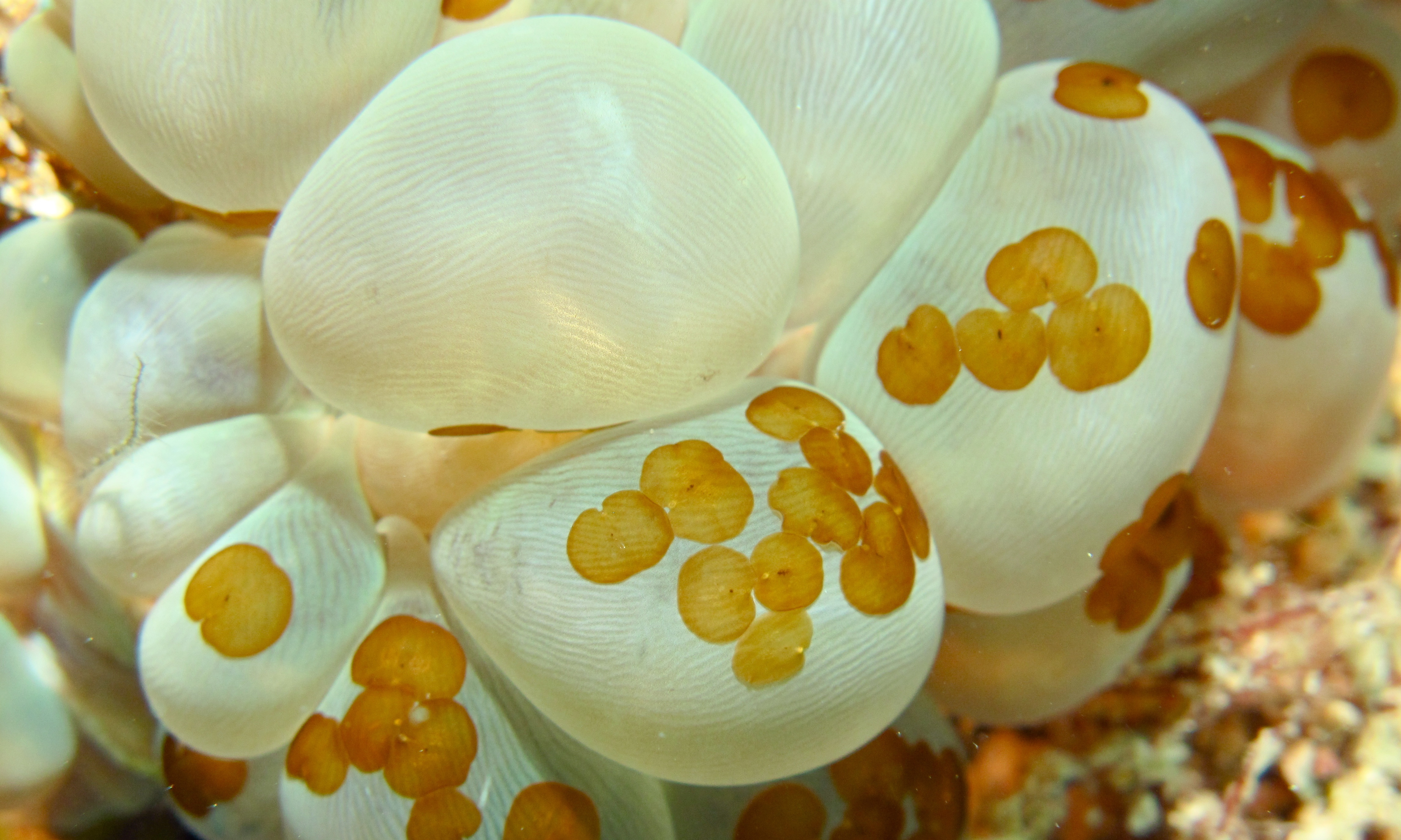
- Waminoa sp. (orange structure) on the Plerogyra sinuosa coral (whitish bubbles).

Scientific classification
- Kingdom: Animalia
- Phylum: Xenacoelomorpha
- Order: Acoela
- Family: Convolutidae
- Genus: Waminoa; Winsor, 1990

Species
- Waminoa brickneri Waminoa litus

= Waminoa =

Genus of acoels

Waminoa is a genus of acoels which are epizoic on living corals, using the coral's mucus as a source of food. Unusually, these acoels harbor two genera of endosymbiotic dinoflagellates: Symbiodinium and Amphidinium; it is not typical for two different genera of dinoflagellates to coexist in a single host. Waminoa's host coral may also contain dinoflagellates of the genus Symbiodinium but not Amphidinium.

Only two species belonging to this genus have been discovered (W. litus and W. brickneri), and they inhabit coral reefs in the Red Sea, Australia, and Indonesia.
