= Paratomy =

Form of asexual reproduction in animals

Paratomy is a form of asexual reproduction in animals where the organism splits in a plane perpendicular to the antero-posterior axis and the split is preceded by the "pregeneration" of the anterior structures in the posterior portion. The developing organisms have their body axis aligned, i.e., they develop in a head to tail fashion.

Budding can be considered to be similar to paratomy except that the body axes need not be aligned: the new head may grow toward the side or even point backward (e.g. Convolutriloba retrogemma an acoel flat worm). In animals that undergo fast paratomy a chain of zooids packed in a head to tail formation may develop. Many oligochaete annelids, acoelous turbellarians, echinoderm larvae and coelenterates reproduce by this method.

== See also ==
- Autotomy – Self-amputation
- Architomy – Form of asexual reproduction

== External resources ==
This paper has a detailed description of the changes during paratomy.
