= Achoerus =

Scientific classification
- Kingdom: Animalia
- Phylum: Xenacoelomorpha
- Order: Acoela
- Family: Anaperidae
- Genus: Achoerus; Beklemischev, 1914

Genus of acoels

Achoerus is a genus of acoels belonging to the family Convolutidae.

Species:

- Achoerus caspius Beklemischev, 1914
- Achoerus ferox Beklemischev, 1937
- Achoerus pachycaudatus Dörjes, 1968
