= Wulguru cuspidata =

Scientific classification
- Kingdom: Animalia
- Phylum: Xenacoelomorpha
- Order: Acoela
- Family: Convolutidae
- Genus: Wulguru; Winsor, 1988
- Species: W. cuspidata

Binomial name
- Wulguru cuspidata Winsor, 1988

Species of acoel

Wulguru cuspidata is a microscopic acoel species that lives on the sandy beaches of northern Queensland (Australia). It is the second species of Australian free-living acoel to be described (the first is Heterochaerus australis). Its generic name, Wulguru, is derived from Wulgurukaba, an Indigenous Australian people from Queensland, and the specific epithet is derived from cuspis (Latin: point, tip), alluding to the characteristic single pointed tail of this animal.

== Characteristics ==
Wulguru cuspidata individuals are colored green due to the presence of zoochlorellae of the order Chlamydomonadales. When hatched, juveniles of this species are colorless, but they quickly turn green as symbiotic microalgae enter their bodies.

The body is less than 2 mm in length, oblong in shape, and has a distinct, pointed, nipple-like tail. The surface of the body is entirely covered with cilia, while along the body margins there are longer sensory cilia. The mouth is mid-ventral, although it is not known whether they are able to feed independently or gain nourishment solely from the symbiotic algae. Like many other acoel species, Wulguru cuspidata is a hermaphrodite.

== Ecology ==
Wulguru cuspidata lives in intertidal zones of open sandy beaches in northern Queensland (Australia). Thousands, or even millions, of individuals aggregate in small, water-filled runnels created by waves. They are known to be able to tolerate extremes of temperature, high levels of sunlight, prolonged periods of shading (due to annual decomposition of seaweeds in the dry season), low oxygen levels, and cyanobacterial blooms.
