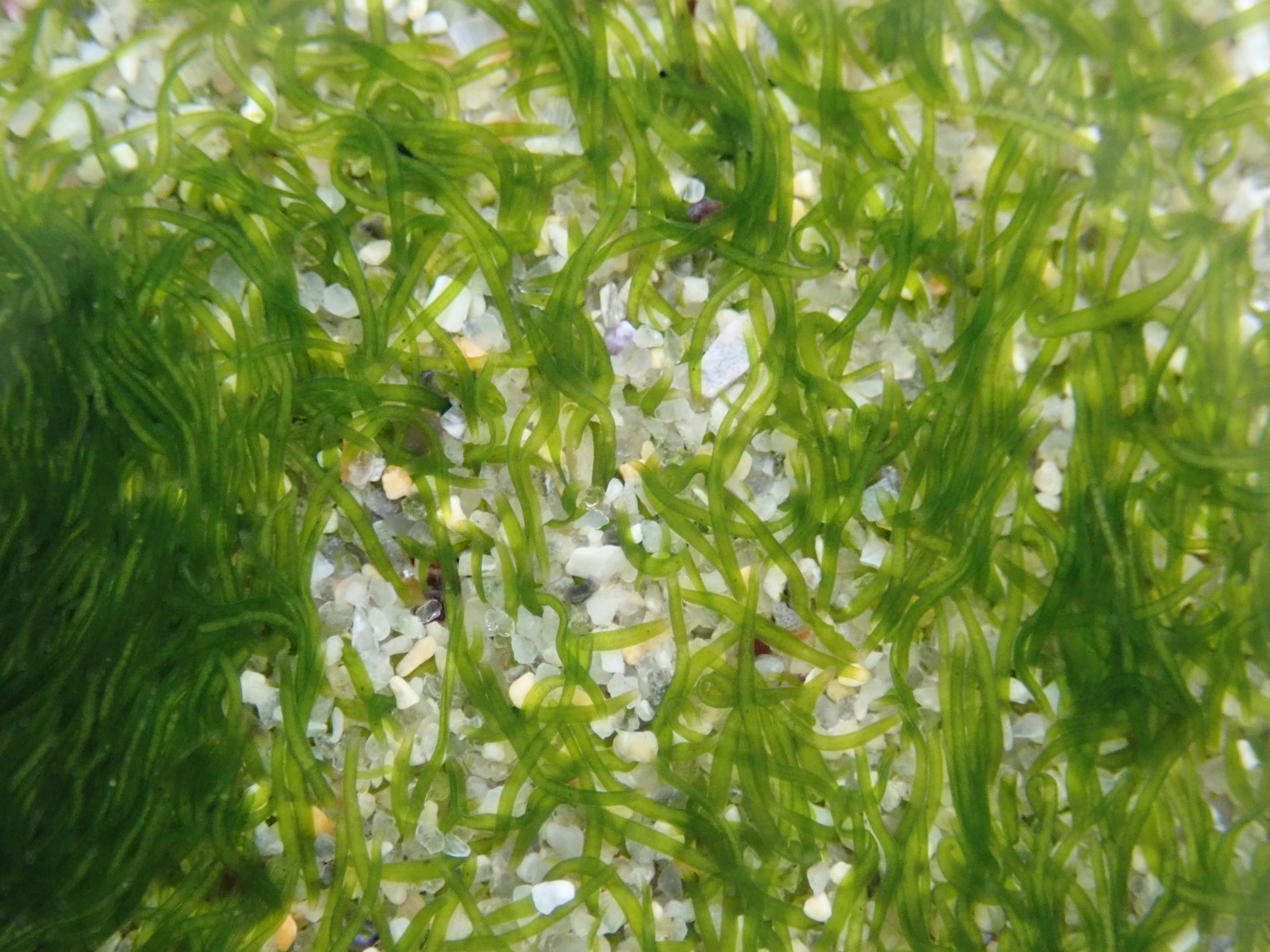

Scientific classification
- Kingdom: Animalia
- Phylum: Xenacoelomorpha
- Order: Acoela
- Family: Convolutidae
- Genus: Symsagittifera; Kostenko & Mamkaev, 1990

Species
- See text

= Symsagittifera =

Genus of acoels

Symsagittifera is a genus of acoels belonging to the family Convolutidae.

The species of this genus are found in Western Europe, the Mediterranean Sea, Black Sea, and South Africa.

Species:

- Symsagittifera bifoveolata (Mamkaev, 1971)
- Symsagittifera corsicae Gschwentner, Baric & Rieger, 2002
- Symsagittifera japonica (Kato, 1951)
- Symsagittifera macnaei (Du Bois-Reymond Marcus, 1957)
- Symsagittifera nitidae (Yamasu, 1982)
- Symsagittifera poenicea Kozloff, 1998
- Symsagittifera psammophila (Beklemischev, 1957)
- Symsagittifera roscoffensis (Graff, 1891)
- Symsagittifera schultzei (Schmidt, 1852)
- Symsagittifera smaragdina Achatz, Gschwentner & Rieger, 2005
