= Peridinin =

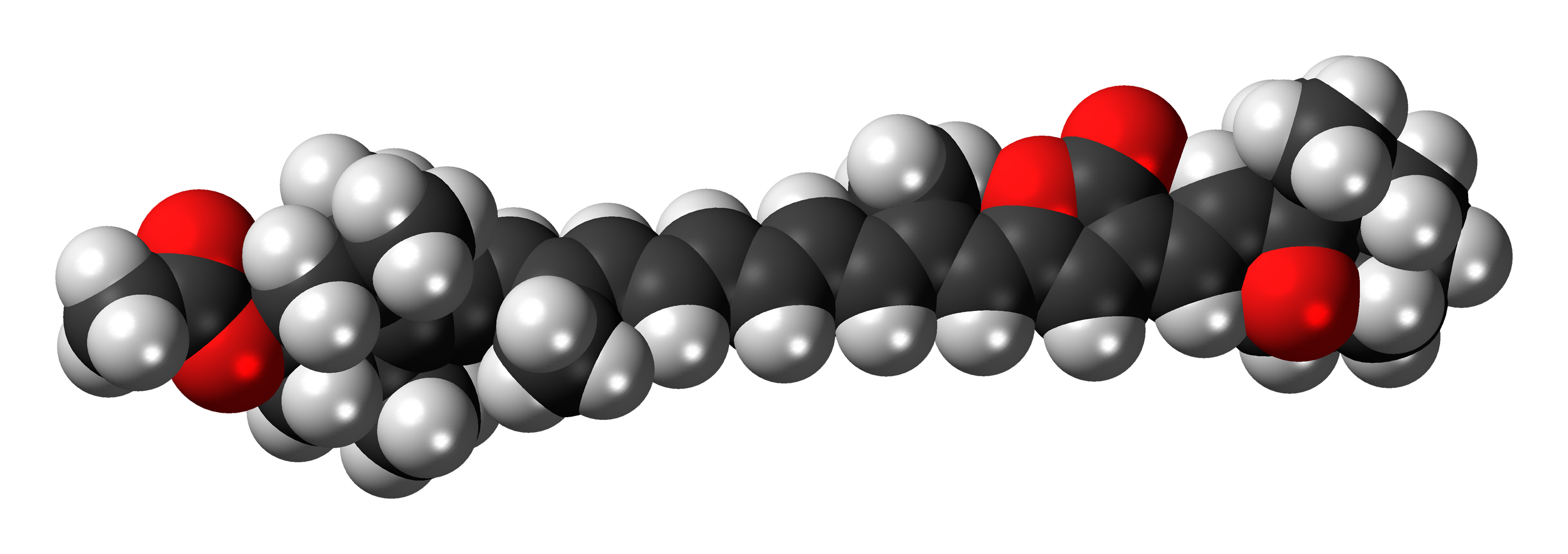

Names
- IUPAC name Acetic acid [(1S,3R)-3-hydroxy-4-[(3E,5E,7E,9E,11Z)-11-[4-[(E)-2-[(1S,4S,6R)-4-hydroxy-2,2,6-trimethyl-7-oxabicyclo[4.1.0]heptan-1-yl]vinyl]-5-oxo-2-furylidene]-3,10-dimethylundeca-1,3,5,7,9-pentaenylidene]-3,5,5-trimethylcyclohexyl] ester

Identifiers
CAS Number	33281-81-1
3D model (JSmol)	Interactive image
ChEMBL	ChEMBL1980535
ChemSpider	4451174
DrugBank	DB03001
PubChem CID	5289155
CompTox Dashboard (EPA)	DTXSID20903948
- InChI: InChI=1S/C39H50O7/c1-26(16-17-33-35(4,5)24-32(44-28(3)40)25-37(33,8)43)14-12-10-11-13-15-27(2)20-31-21-29(34(42)45-31)18-19-39-36(6,7)22-30(41)23-38(39,9)46-39/h10-16,18-21,30,32,41,43H,22-25H2,1-9H3/b12-10+,13-11+,19-18+,26-14+,27-15+,31-20-/t17?,30-,32-,37+,38+,39-/m0/s1 Key: UYRDHEJRPVSJFM-VSWVFQEASA-N
- SMILES: [H][C@@](/[C@@](C)=C/C=C/C=C/C=C(C)/C=C2C=C(/C=C/[C@@]3(O4)[C@]4(C)C[C@@H](O)CC(C)3C)C(O\2)=O)=C=C1[C@](C)(O)C[C@@H](OC(C)=O)CC(C)1C

Properties
Chemical formula	C_{39}H_{50}O_{7}
Molar mass	630.822 g·mol^{−1}
- Except where otherwise noted, data are given for materials in their standard state (at 25 °C [77 °F], 100 kPa). verify (what is ?) Infobox references

Peridinin is a light-harvesting apocarotenoid, a pigment associated with chlorophyll and found in the peridinin-chlorophyll-protein (PCP) light-harvesting complex in dinoflagellates, best studied in Amphidinium carterae.

== Biological significance ==
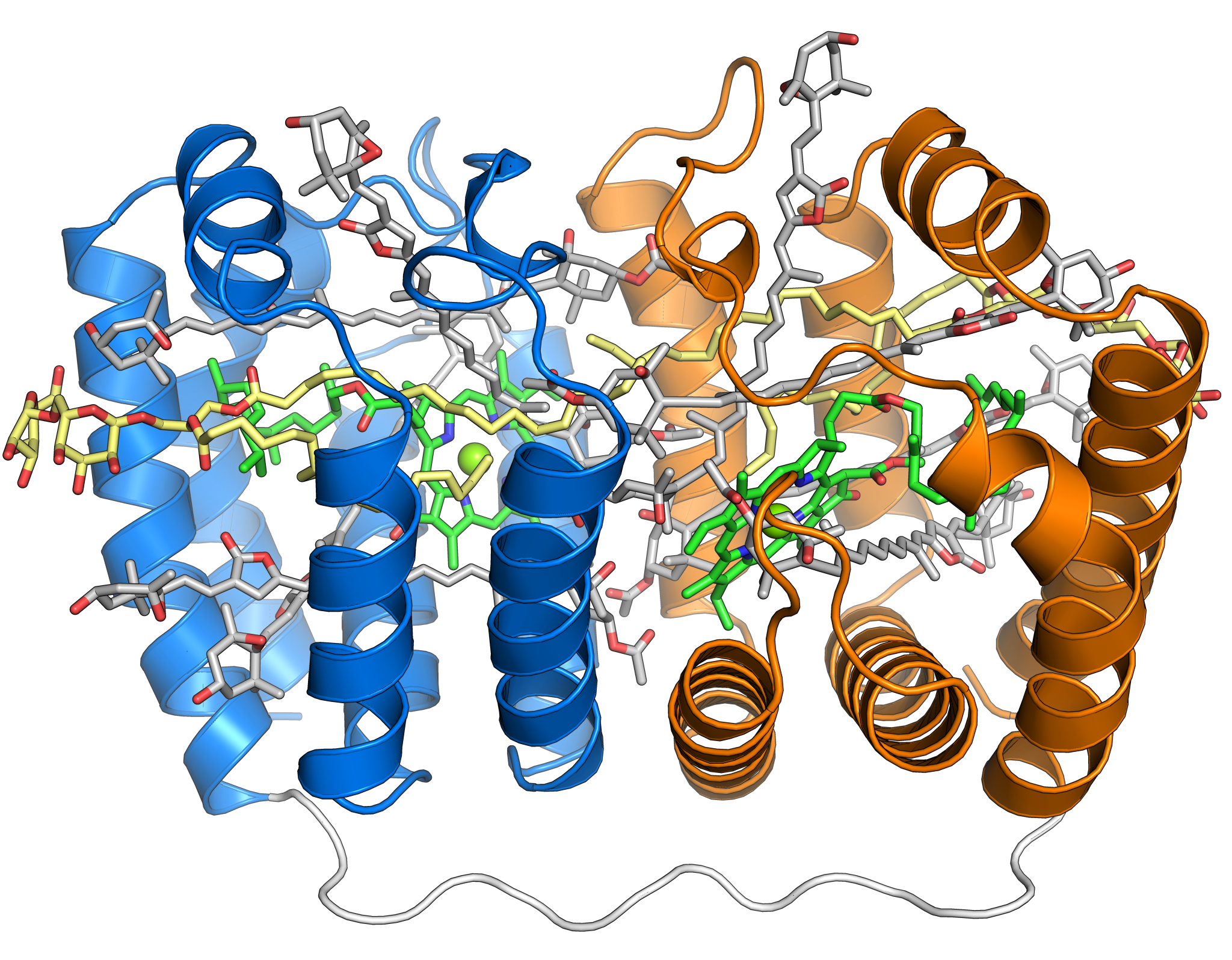
Crystal structure of the soluble peridinin-chlorophyll-protein complex from the photosynthetic dinoflagellate Amphidinium carterae. This complex is found in many photosynthetic dinoflagellates and involves a boat or cradle-shaped protein with two pseudosymmetrical repeats of eight alpha helices (shown in blue and orange) wrapped around a pigment-filled central cavity. Each eight-helix segment binds one chlorophyll molecule (green, with central magnesium ion shown as a green sphere), one diacylglycerol molecule (yellow) and four peridinin molecules (gray).

Peridinin is an apocarotenoid pigment that some organisms use in photosynthesis. Many photosynthetic dinoflagellates use peridinin, which absorbs blue-green light in the 470–550 nm range, outside the range accessible to chlorophyll molecules. The peridinin-chlorophyll-protein complex is a specialized molecular complex consisting of a boat-shaped protein molecule with a large central cavity that contains peridinin, chlorophyll, and lipid molecules, usually in a 4:1 ratio of peridinin to chlorophyll.

== Spectral characteristics ==
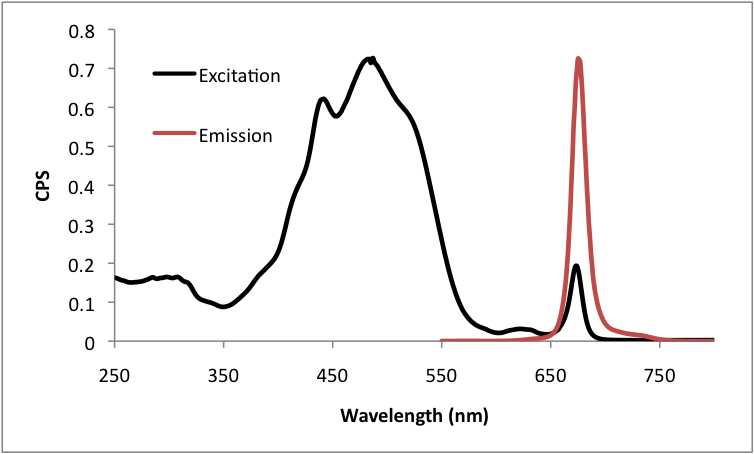
Emission and excitation spectra of Peridinin Chlorophyll (PerCP)

- Absorption maximum: 483 nm
- Emission maximum: 676 nm
- Extinction coefficient (ε): 1.96 × 10^{6}M^{−1}cm^{−1}
- A_{483}/A_{280} ≥ 4.6

== Applications ==
Peridinin chlorophyll (PerCP) is commonly used in immunoassays such as fluorescence-activated cell sorting (FACS) and flow cytometry. The fluorophore is covalently linked to proteins or antibodies for use in research applications.
