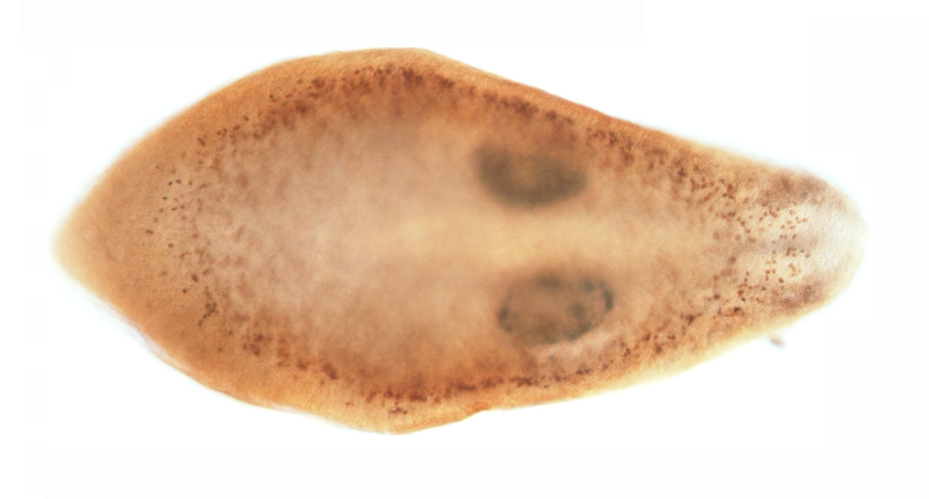
- Neochildia fusca

Scientific classification
- Domain: Eukaryota
- Kingdom: Animalia
- Phylum: Xenacoelomorpha
- Order: Acoela
- Family: Convolutidae
- Genus: Neochildia; Bush, 1975
- Species: N. fusca

Binomial name
- Neochildia fusca (Bush, 1975)

= Neochildia =

Genus of acoels

Neochildia is a monotypic genus of a dark brown acoel belonging to the family Convolutidae. The only species is Neochildia fusca.

The nervous system is composed of an anterior compact brain organized as a layer of neural somata surrounding a central neuropil free of cell bodies.
