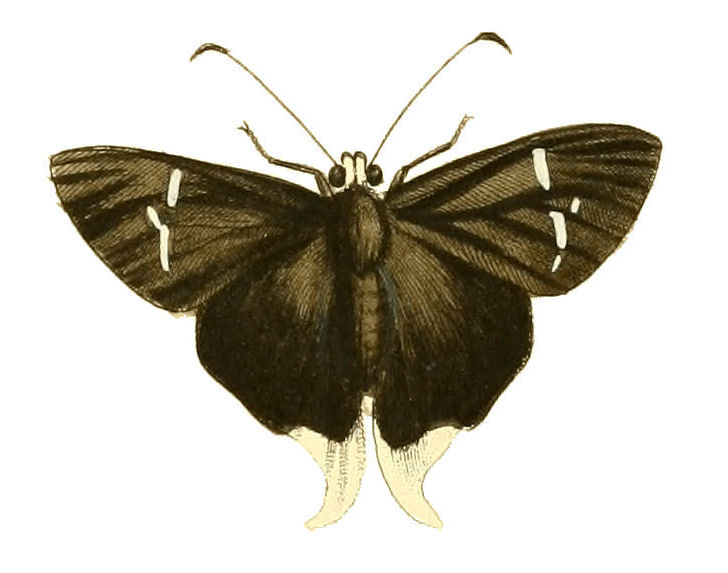
- Illustration by Dru Drury

Scientific classification
- Kingdom: Animalia
- Phylum: Arthropoda
- Class: Insecta
- Order: Lepidoptera
- Family: Hesperiidae
- Genus: Cogia
- Species: C. crameri

Binomial name
- Cogia crameri (McHenry, 1960)

Synonyms
- Papilio orion Cramer, 1777; Typhedanus crameri McHenry, 1960

= Cogia crameri =

Species of butterfly

Cogia crameri is a species of butterfly in the family Hesperiidae, native to Central America and Suriname. It was described by Pieter Cramer in 1777 using the name Papilio orion, which was preoccupied (see Scolitantides orion). A replacement name honouring Cramer was designated in 1960.

== Description ==
Upper side. Antennae black. Thorax, abdomen, and wings dark olive brown. Anterior wings having a small narrow transparent white line crossing them from the anterior edges to the lower corners, intersected by the brown tendons of the wings. Posterior wings terminating in two white, short, and broad tails.

Under side. Palpi white. Breast, abdomen, and wings coloured as on the upper side; the posterior differing merely in having their outward edges bordered with white. Wing-span 2 inches (50 mm).
