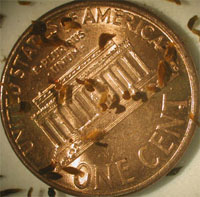
- C. convoluta with a coin 19 mm in diameter

Scientific classification
- Domain: Eukaryota
- Kingdom: Animalia
- Phylum: Xenacoelomorpha
- Order: Acoela
- Family: Convolutidae
- Genus: Convoluta
- Species: C. convoluta

Binomial name
- Convoluta convoluta Peter Christian Abildgaard, 1806. In: O.F. Müller, Zoologia Danica, 4.

Synonyms
- List: Convoluta albicincta Schultze, 1851; Convoluta armata Graff, 1874; Convoluta diesingii Schmidt, 1852; Convoluta haustrum Dalyell, 1853; Convoluta infundibulum Schmidt, 1861; Convoluta johnstoni Diesing, 1862; Convoluta paradoxa Ørsted, 1843; Monotus albicinctus (Schultze, 1849); Monotus diesingi Schmidt, 1861; Monotus johnstoni Diesing, 1862 (nomen nudum); Monotus paradoxa Claperede, 1861; Planaria convoluta Abildgaard, 1806

= Convoluta convoluta =

Species of acoel

Convoluta convoluta is a small acoel in the family Convolutidae. Native to the Baltic Sea, it invaded the Gulf of Maine in the late 1990s.

== Diet and symbiosis ==
It consumes juvenile settling mussels and harpacticoid copepods. It also engages in a symbiosis with a diatom of the genus Lichmophora, which has also invaded the Gulf of Maine.

== Impact and ecology in the Gulf of Maine ==
In the Gulf of Maine, the impact of this species appears minimal as the habitat is presumably saturated with food, and the species is ultimately self-limited by species competition. It also appears limited to wave-protected habitats, where it prefers filamentous algae. In 2001, it occurred in densities of up to 19 per square centimeter.
