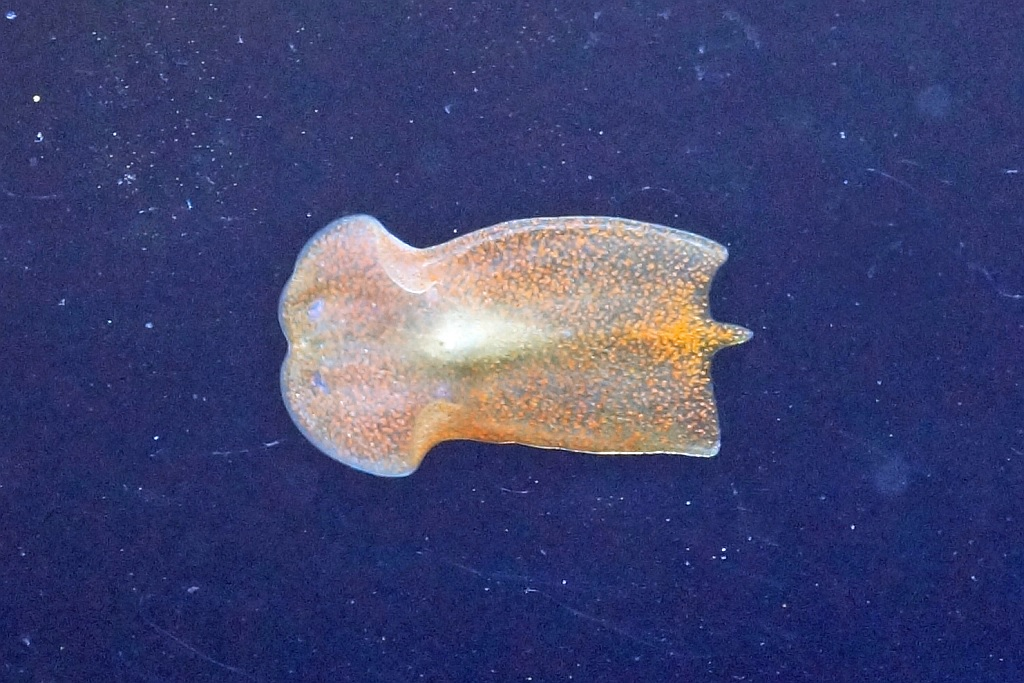

Scientific classification
- Kingdom: Animalia
- Phylum: Xenacoelomorpha
- Order: Acoela
- Family: Convolutidae
- Genus: Convolutriloba
- Species: C. retrogemma

Binomial name
- Convolutriloba retrogemma Hendelberg & Akesson, 1988

= Convolutriloba retrogemma =

Species of acoel

Convolutriloba retrogemma is a reddish-brown acoel 2 mm in length, also commonly known as redbug, red planaria, rust flatworm, or simply red flatworm. It is a marine animal that gets energy from its endosymbiotic algae or from the consumption of small invertebrates such as copepods and rotifers. Like some other acoels, it is known to starve coral of sunlight while searching for food on the corals' surface due to its rapid reproduction.

C. retrogemma, like many other acoels, contains dangerous toxins to keep its predators away, and, on death, it can release these toxins. This is harmful to nearby life, such as coral and fish, and even people if infected fish are consumed.

== Reproduction ==
Convolutriloba retrogemma reproduces quickly either sexually by laying eggs or asexually by using budding and binary fission, where it splits up and makes a bud that will create a new worm, or by using fragmentation, where it forms new parent organisms from fragments of one original parent organism.

== Distribution ==
It is found globally but originates from Cuba. Due to their reproduction techniques, they can be a plague to aquariums and fish tanks, as they are very harmful, unsightly, and difficult to remove without harming other life nearby.
