= Heterochaerus =

Scientific classification
- Domain: Eukaryota
- Kingdom: Animalia
- Phylum: Xenacoelomorpha
- Order: Acoela
- Family: Convolutidae
- Genus: Heterochaerus; Haswell, 1905

Genus of acoels

Heterochaerus is a genus of acoels belonging to the family Convolutidae.

The species of this genus are found in Australia and Central America.

Species:

- Heterochaerus australis Haswell, 1905
- Heterochaerus blumi (Achatz, Hooge & Tyler, 2007)
- Heterochaerus carvalhoi (Marcus, 1952)
- Heterochaerus langerhansi (Graff, 1882)
- Heterochaerus sargassi (Hyman, 1939)
