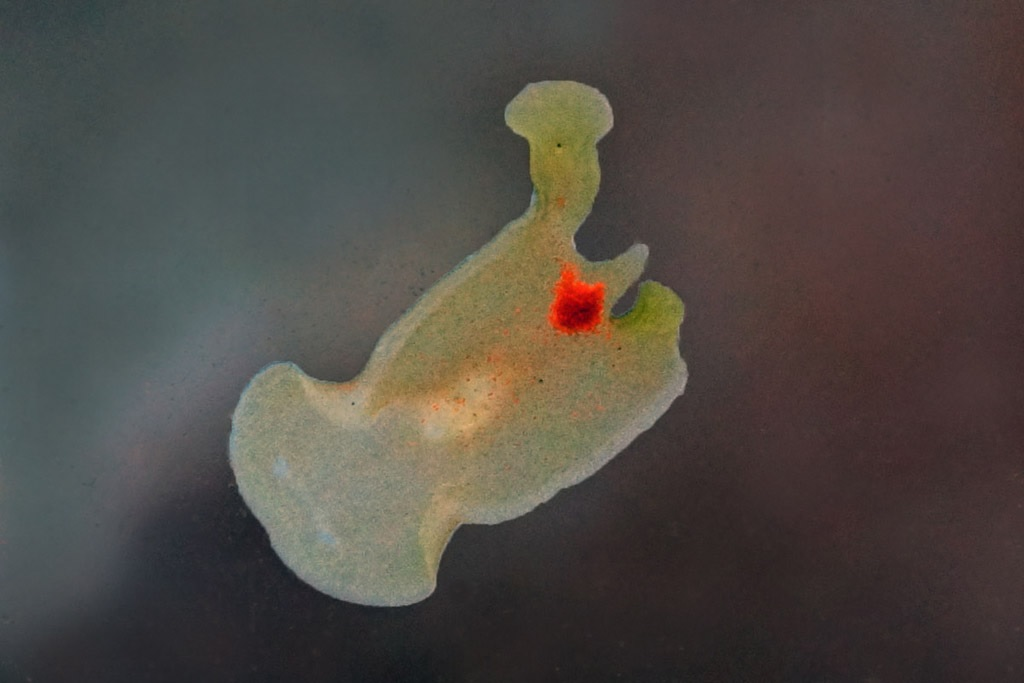
- Convolutriloba macropyga in an aquarium glass

Scientific classification
- Kingdom: Animalia
- Phylum: Xenacoelomorpha
- Order: Acoela
- Family: Convolutidae
- Genus: Convolutriloba
- Species: C. macropyga

Binomial name
- Convolutriloba macropyga Shannon & Achatz, 2007

= Convolutriloba macropyga =

Species of Acoel

Convolutriloba macropyga is a species within the order Acoela.
