= Waminoa litus =

Scientific classification
- Domain: Eukaryota
- Kingdom: Animalia
- Phylum: Xenacoelomorpha
- Order: Acoela
- Family: Convolutidae
- Genus: Waminoa
- Species: W. litus

Binomial name
- Waminoa litus (Winsor, 1990)

Species of acoel

Waminoa litus is a species of dinoflagellate-bearing acoel which is epizoic on living corals. This species is unique in that it transmits its endosymbiotic dinoflagellates (zooxanthellae) vertically (from the parent host to the offspring) via eggs, regardless of the heterogeneity of the zooxanthellae. Two dinoflagellate genera have been found to simultaneously live in the parenchyma of W. litus: Symbiodinium and Amphidinium.
