= Convolutriloba hastifera =

Scientific classification
- Kingdom: Animalia
- Phylum: Xenacoelomorpha
- Order: Acoela
- Family: Convolutidae
- Genus: Convolutriloba
- Species: C. hastifera

Binomial name
- Convolutriloba hastifera (Winsor, 1990)

Species of acoel

Convolutriloba hastifera is a species of acoel. It is known from Australia, being originally collected from Magnetic Island, and is the only species of Convolutriloba to be described from its natural habitat.

C. hastifera reproduces by transversal fission.

== Description ==
C. hastifera are usually about 3 mm long and 1.5 mm wide. It is translucent greenish yellow to greenish brown in colour, flattened, broad, and rounded anteriorly. The colouring is a result of symbiotic algae. The mid-third of the body is slightly narrowed before forming three lobes. The middle lobe is slightly elevated.

Two elliptic eyes, 19 μm by 34 μm, are present in the anterior regions, with reddish-brown granules. The cerebral ganglion is bilobed and sunken, and there is no statocyst-statolith present.

The mouth is positioned on the anterior half of the body, and ingested amphipods were found in a live specimen.

== Etymology ==
The species epithet, "hastifera", is derived from the Latin words hasta - a spear, and ferens - bearing. This refers to the prominent anterior batteries of the sagittocysts present in C. hastifera.
