= Amphiscolops =

Scientific classification
- Domain: Eukaryota
- Kingdom: Animalia
- Phylum: Xenacoelomorpha
- Order: Acoela
- Family: Convolutidae
- Genus: Amphiscolops; Graff, 1904

Genus of acoels

Amphiscolops is a genus of acoels belonging to the family Convolutidae.

The species of this genus are found in America.

== Species ==
The following species are recognised in the genus Amphiscolops:

- Amphiscolops bermudensis Hyman, 1939
- Amphiscolops castellonensis Steinböck, 1954
- Amphiscolops cinereus (Graff, 1874)
- Amphiscolops evelinae Marcus, 1947
- Amphiscolops fuligineus Peebles, 1913
- Amphiscolops gemelliporus Marcus, 1954
- Amphiscolops gerundensis Steinböck, 1954
- Amphiscolops japonicus Kato, 1947
- Amphiscolops marinelliensis Beltagi & Khafagi, 1984
- Amphiscolops mosaicus Kozloff, 1998
- Amphiscolops potocani Achatz, 2008
- Amphiscolops trifurcatus (Beltagi, 1983)
- Amphiscolops zeii Riedl, 1956
