= Achoerus ferox =

Scientific classification
- Kingdom: Animalia
- Phylum: Xenacoelomorpha
- Order: Acoela
- Family: Anaperidae
- Genus: Achoerus
- Species: A. ferox

Binomial name
- Achoerus ferox Beklemischev, 1937

Species of worm

Achoerus ferox is a species of acoel belonging to the family Convolutidae. It was first described by Vladimir Beklemishev in 1937. It is found in the Caspian Sea.
