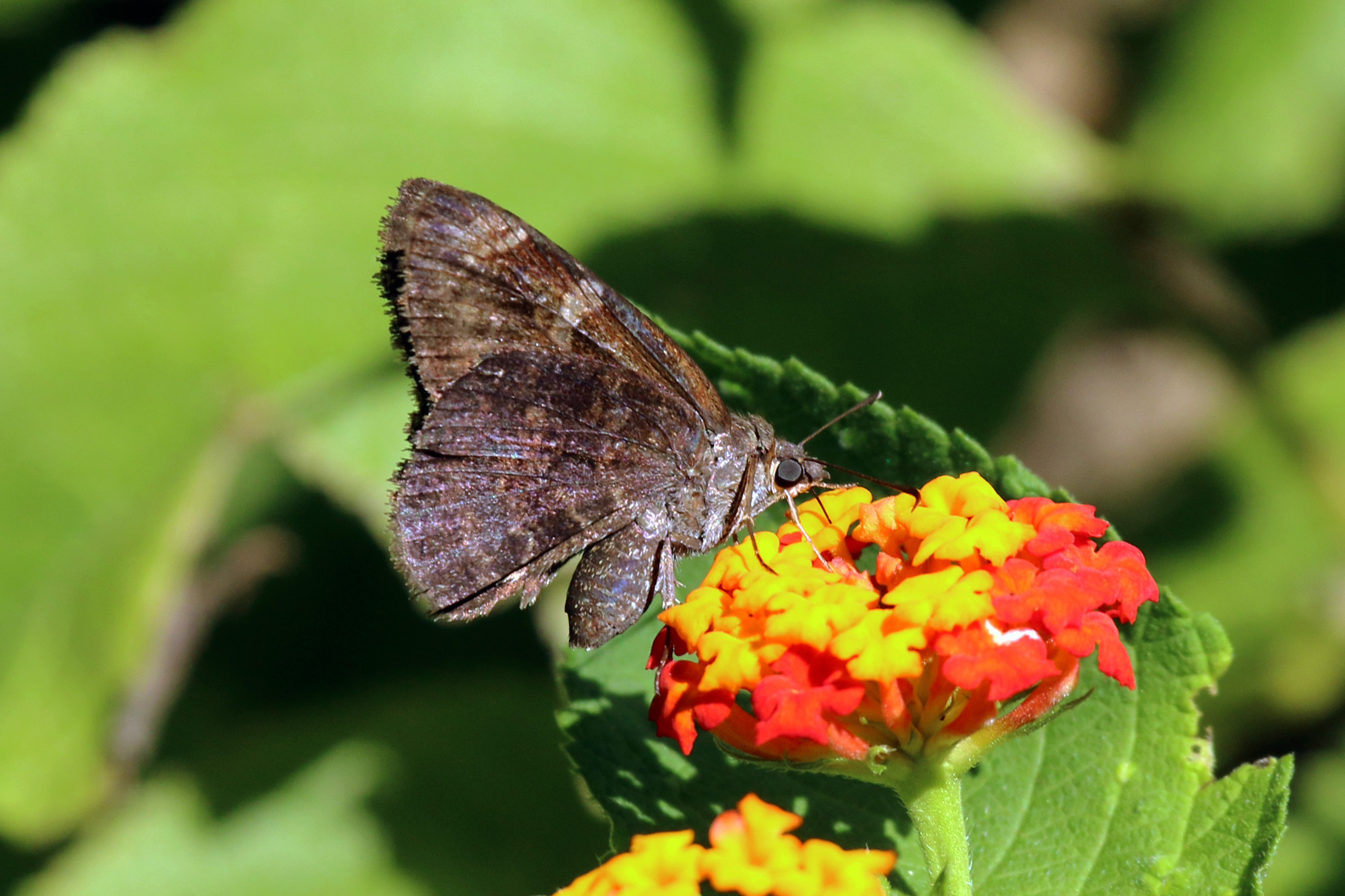
- In Tobago

Scientific classification
- Kingdom: Animalia
- Phylum: Arthropoda
- Class: Insecta
- Order: Lepidoptera
- Family: Hesperiidae
- Genus: Cogia
- Species: C. calchas

Binomial name
- Cogia calchas (Herrich-Schaffer, 1869)

Synonyms
- Spathilepia terranea Butler, 1872

= Cogia calchas =

Species of butterfly

Cogia calchas, the mimosa skipper, is a Nearctic species of dicot skipper in the butterfly family Hesperiidae.
