= Brachypea =

Scientific classification
- Domain: Eukaryota
- Kingdom: Animalia
- Phylum: Xenacoelomorpha
- Order: Acoela
- Family: Convolutidae
- Genus: Brachypea; Antonius, 1968

Genus of acoels

Brachypea is a genus of acoels belonging to the family Convolutidae.

Species:

- Brachypea kenoma Antonius, 1968
