= Antrosagittifera =

Scientific classification
- Domain: Eukaryota
- Kingdom: Animalia
- Phylum: Xenacoelomorpha
- Order: Acoela
- Family: Sagittiferidae
- Genus: Antrosagittifera; Hooge & Tyler, 2001

Genus of acoels

Antrosagittifera is a genus of acoels belonging to the family Convolutidae.

Species:

- Antrosagittifera corallina Hooge & Tyler, 2001
