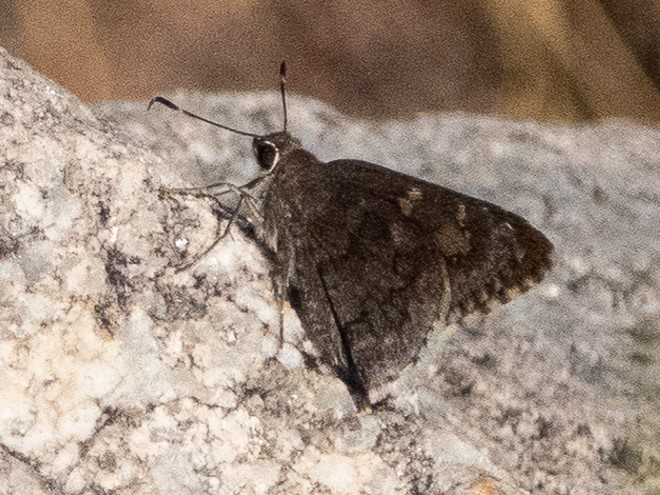

Scientific classification
- Kingdom: Animalia
- Phylum: Arthropoda
- Class: Insecta
- Order: Lepidoptera
- Family: Hesperiidae
- Genus: Cogia
- Species: C. hippalus

Binomial name
- Cogia hippalus (W. H. Edwards, 1882)

= Cogia hippalus =

Species of butterfly

Cogia hippalus, the acacia skipper, is a species of dicot skipper in the butterfly family Hesperiidae. It is found in Central America, North America, and South America.

== Subspecies ==
The following subspecies are recognised:

- Cogia hippalus hester Evans, 1953
- Cogia hippalus hippalus (W. H. Edwards, 1882)
- Cogia hippalus hiska Evans, 1953
- Cogia hippalus peninsularis Miller & MacNeill, 1969
