= Haplodiscus =

Scientific classification
- Domain: Eukaryota
- Kingdom: Animalia
- Phylum: Xenacoelomorpha
- Order: Acoela
- Family: Convolutidae
- Genus: Haplodiscus; Weldon, 1888

Genus of acoels

Haplodiscus is a genus of acoels belonging to the family Convolutidae.

Species:

- Haplodiscus acuminatus Bohmig, 1895
- Haplodiscus bocki Dörjes, 1970
- Haplodiscus incola (Leiper, 1902)
- Haplodiscus obtusus Bohmig, 1895
- Haplodiscus ovatus Bohmig, 1895
- Haplodiscus piger Weldon, 1888
- Haplodiscus ussovi Sabussow, 1896
- Haplodiscus weldoni Bohmig, 1895
