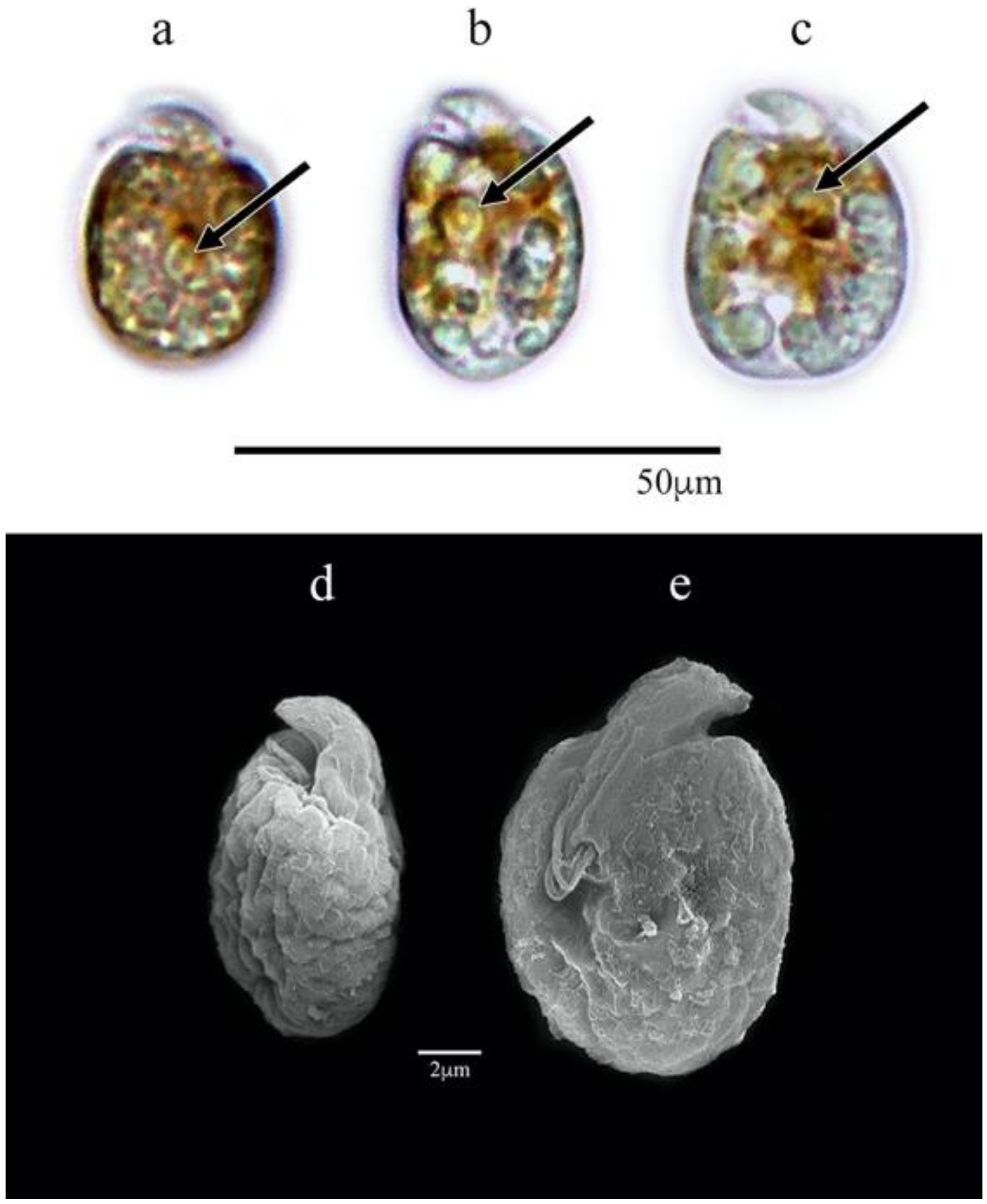
- LM (above) and SEM (below) micrographs of A. carterae

Scientific classification
- Domain: Eukaryota
- Clade: Sar
- Clade: Alveolata
- Phylum: Dinoflagellata
- Class: Dinophyceae
- Order: Gymnodiniales
- Family: Gymnodiniaceae
- Genus: Amphidinium
- Species: A. carterae

Binomial name
- Amphidinium carterae Hulburt, 1957

Synonyms
- A. microcephalum R.E.Norris; A. klebsii Carter 1937

= Amphidinium carterae =

Species of single-celled organism

Amphidinium carterae is a species of dinoflagellates. It was first described by Edward M. Hulburt in 1957, and was named in honour of the British phycologist Nellie Carter-Montford. The type locality is Great Pond, Barnstable County, Massachusetts, USA. Some strains of this species are considered as toxic (against fungi, for example).

== Distribution ==
Amphidinium carterae is known from both sides of the North Atlantic Ocean, the Bay of Fundy, the Gulf of Mexico, the Baltic Sea, the North Sea and the Mediterranean Sea. It also occurs in Brazil and New Zealand. It is found in shallow waters in coastal bays and estuaries.

== Ecology ==
Amphidinium carterae is a species that sometimes causes algal blooms. In laboratory, the presence of a lysate of an A. carterae strain affects the embryonic development of sea urchins.

== Use in research ==
Amphidinium carterae is a photosynthetic organism and can be cultured in the laboratory under suitable conditions of temperature and light. It is a peridinin-containing dinoflagellate, and has been used as a model organism for research. It has a highly unusual chloroplast genome with genes mounted on many small minicircle elements, and an unusual pattern of RNA metabolism.
