= Adenopea =

Scientific classification
- Domain: Eukaryota
- Kingdom: Animalia
- Phylum: Xenacoelomorpha
- Order: Acoela
- Family: Antroposthiidae
- Genus: Adenopea; Antonius, 1968

Genus of acoels

Adenopea is a genus of acoels belonging to the family Convolutidae.

Species:

- Adenopea cenata (Du Bois-Reymond Marcus, 1955)
- Adenopea chuni (Brauner, 1920)
- Adenopea illardata Löhner & Micoletzky, 1911
- Adenopea illardatus (Lohner & Micoletzky, 1911)
