= Conaperta =

Scientific classification
- Domain: Eukaryota
- Kingdom: Animalia
- Phylum: Xenacoelomorpha
- Order: Acoela
- Family: Convolutidae
- Genus: Conaperta; Antonius, 1968

Genus of acoels

Conaperta is a genus of acoels belonging to the family Convolutidae.

Species:

- Conaperta antonii Achatz, Hooge & Tyler, 2007
- Conaperta cirrata Achatz, Hooge & Tyler, 2007
- Conaperta flavibacillum (Jensen, 1878)
- Conaperta lineata (Peebles, 1915)
