= Achoerus caspius =

Scientific classification
- Kingdom: Animalia
- Phylum: Xenacoelomorpha
- Order: Acoela
- Family: Anaperidae
- Genus: Achoerus
- Species: A. caspius

Binomial name
- Achoerus caspius Beklemischev, 1914

Species of acoel

Achoerus caspius is a species of acoel belonging to the family Convolutidae.
