= Luteophanol =

Group of chemical compounds

Luteophanol is a type of organic compound. There are variants labeled luteophanol A through luteophanol D. They contain the following common fragments with amphidinols:

1. Polyhydroxyl groups.
2. Two tetrahydropyran rings.

Luteophanols have demonstrated antibacterial properties, but unlike amphidinols, they do not show antifungal activity.

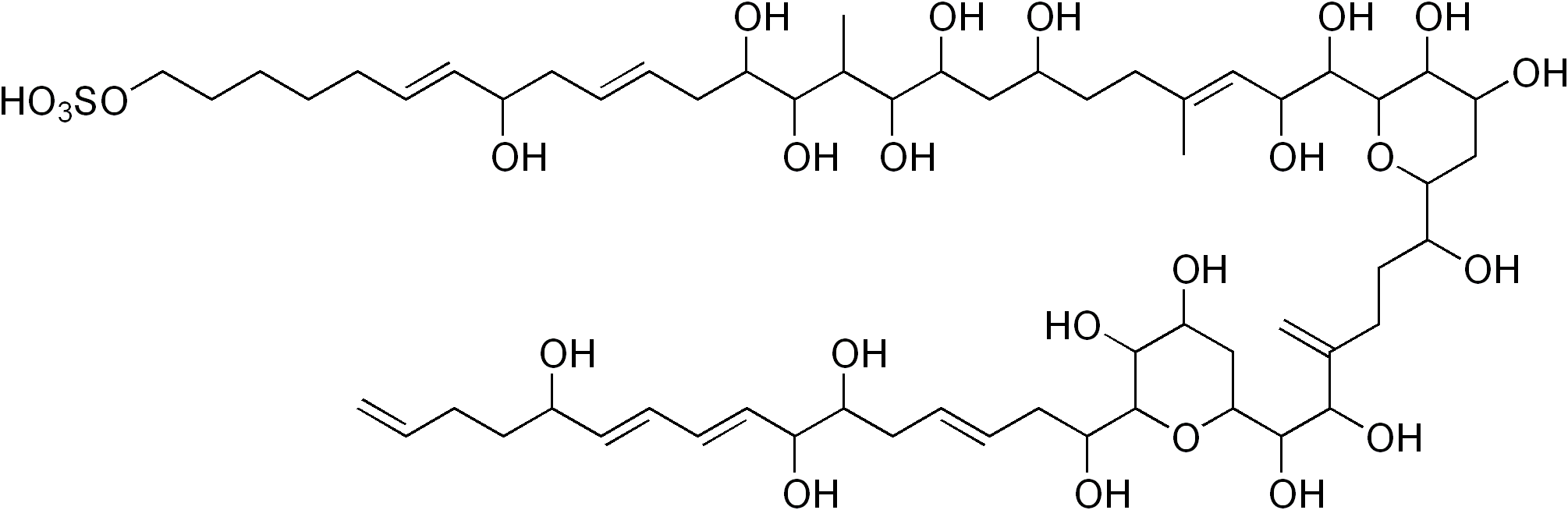
Chemical structure of luteophanol A
