= Fragmentation (reproduction) =

Form of asexual reproduction

Fragmentation in multicellular or colonial organisms is a form of asexual reproduction or cloning, where an organism splits into fragments upon maturation, creating a new individual if the split part is large enough.

The organism may develop specific organs or zones to shed or be easily broken off. If the splitting occurs without the prior preparation of the organism, both fragments must be able to regenerate the complete organism for it to function as reproduction.

Fragmentation as a method of reproduction is seen in organisms such as spirogyra, filamentous cyanobacteria, molds, lichens, sponges, acoel flatworms, some annelid worms and sea stars.

== Fragmentation in various organisms ==
Molds, yeasts and mushrooms, all of which are part of the Fungi kingdom, produce tiny filaments called hyphae. These hyphae obtain food and nutrients from the body of other organisms to grow and fertilize. Then a piece of hyphae breaks off and grows into a new individual and the cycle continues.

Many lichens produce specialized structures that can easily break away and disperse. These structures contain both hyphae of the mycobiont and the algae (phycobiont) (see soredia and isidia). Larger fragments of the thallus may break away when the lichen dries or due to mechanical disturbances (see the section on reproduction in lichens).

== Plants ==
Fragmentation is a very common type of vegetative reproduction in plants. Many trees, shrubs, nonwoody perennials, and ferns form clonal colonies by producing new rooted shoots by rhizomes or stolons, which increases the diameter of the colony. If a rooted shoot becomes detached from the colony, then fragmentation has occurred. There are several other mechanisms of natural fragmentation in plants.

- Production of specialized reproductive structures: A few plants produce adventitious plantlets on their leaves, which drop off and form independent plants, e.g. Tolmiea menziesii and Kalanchoe daigremontiana. Others produce organs like bulbils and turions.
- Easily lost parts that have high potential to grow into a complete plant: Some woody plants like the willow naturally shed twigs. This is termed cladoptosis. The lost twigs may form roots in a suitable environment to establish a new plant. River currents often tear off branch fragments from certain cottonwood species growing on riverbanks. Fragments reaching suitable environments can root and establish new plants. Some cacti and other plants have jointed stems. When a stem segment, called a pad, falls off, it can root and form a new plant. Leaves of some plants readily root when they fall off, such as Sedum and Echeveria.
- Fragmentation is observed in nonvascular plants as well, for example, in liverworts and mosses. Small pieces of moss "stems" or "leaves" are often scattered by the wind, water or animals. If a moss fragment reaches a suitable environment, it can establish a new plant. They also produce gemmae, for example in the splash-cups of Marchantia polymorpha, that are easily broken off and distributed.

People use fragmentation to artificially propagate many plants via division, layering, cuttings, grafting, micropropagation and storage organs, such as bulbs, corms, tubers and rhizomes.

Many algae too, spirogyra for example also fragment, the mother plant breaks into two or more smaller fragments which then grow independently. After growing these individual spirogyra fragment, repeating the cycle.

== Animals ==
Sponges and coral colonies naturally fragment and reproduce. Many species of annelids and flatworms produce by this method. When the splitting occurs due to specific developmental changes, the terms architomy, paratomy, and budding are used. In 'architomy' the animal splits at a particular point and the two fragments regenerate the missing organs and tissues. The splitting is not preceded by the development of the tissues to be lost. Before splitting, the animal may develop furrows at the zone of splitting. The headless fragment must regenerate a completely new head. In 'paratomy', the split occurs perpendicular to the antero-posterior axis and the split is preceded by the "pregeneration" of the anterior structures in the posterior portion. The two organisms have their body axis aligned i.e. they develop in a head to tail fashion. Budding is similar to paratomy except that the body axes need not be aligned: the new head may grow toward the side or even point backward (e.g. Convolutriloba retrogemma an acoel flat worm).

=== Coral ===
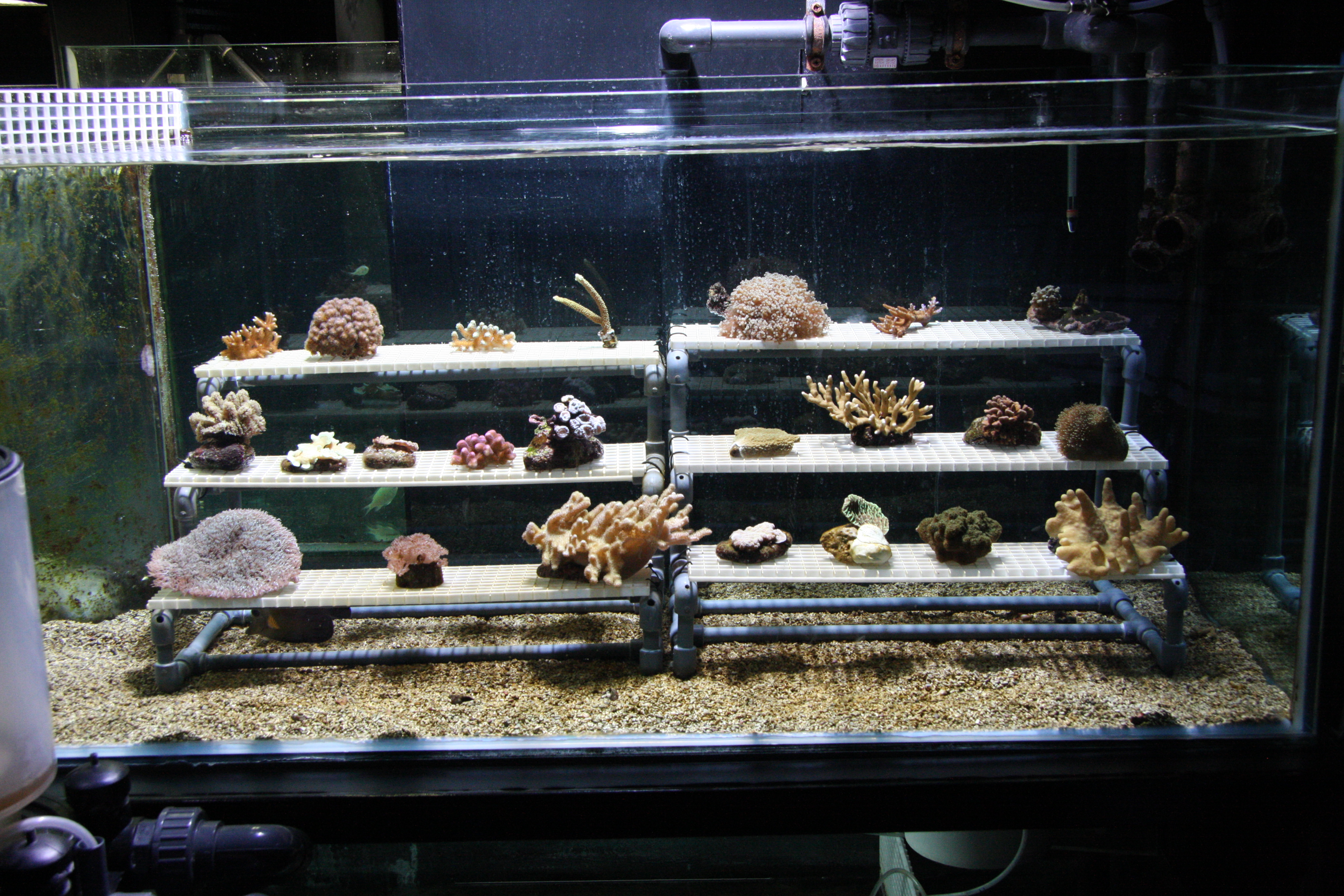
Corals can be multiplied in aquaria by attaching "frags" from a mother colony to a suitable substrate, such as a ceramic plug or a piece of live rock. This aquarium is designed specifically for growing coral colonies from frags.

Many types of coral colonies can increase in number by fragmentation occurring naturally or artificially. Reef aquarium enthusiasts fragment corals for various purposes including shape control; sharing with others; regrowth experiments; and minimizing damage to natural coral reefs. Both hard and soft corals can be fragmented. Genera highly tolerant of fragmentation include Acropora, Montipora, Pocillopora, Euphyllia, and Caulastraea among others. Most sea anemones reproduce through fragmentation via a variety of methods including longitudinal fission, where the original anemone splits across the middle forming two equal-sized anemones, and basal laceration, in which small parts of the animal split from the base to form new anemones.

=== Echinoderms ===
In echinoderms, the process is usually known as fissiparity (a term also used infrequently for biological fission in general). Some species can intentionally reproduce in this manner through autotomy. This method is more common during the larval editing stages.

== Disadvantage of this process of reproduction ==
As this process is a form of asexual reproduction, it does not produce genetic diversity in the offspring. Therefore, these are more vulnerable to changing environments, parasites, and diseases.

== See also ==
- Fission (biology)
- Budding
- Micropropagation
