= Thalassoanaperus =

Scientific classification
- Kingdom: Animalia
- Phylum: Xenacoelomorpha
- Order: Acoela
- Family: Convolutidae
- Genus: Thalassoanaperus; Hernandez, 2018

Genus of acoels

Thalassoanaperus is a genus of acoels belonging to the family Convolutidae.

The species of this genus are found in Europe.

Species:

- Thalassoanaperus australis (Westblad, 1952)
- Thalassoanaperus biaculeatus (Boguta, 1970)
- Thalassoanaperus gardineri (Graff, 1911)
- Thalassoanaperus ornatus (Beltagi, 2001)
- Thalassoanaperus rubellus (Westblad, 1945)
- Thalassoanaperus singularis (Hooge & Smith, 2004)
- Thalassoanaperus sulcatus (Beklemischev, 1914)
- Thalassoanaperus tvaerminnensis (Luther, 1912)
