= Cogia =

Scientific classification
- Kingdom: Animalia
- Phylum: Arthropoda
- Class: Insecta
- Order: Lepidoptera
- Family: Hesperiidae
- Subfamily: Eudaminae
- Genus: Cogia; Butler, 1870

Synonyms
- Phoedinus Godman & Salvin, 1894; Anaperus Mabille & Boullet, 1919; Caicella Hemming, 1934

Genus of butterflies

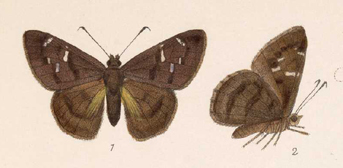
Cogia cajeta (Herrich-Schäffer, 1869)

Cogia is a genus of Neotropical butterflies in the family Hesperiidae (Eudaminae).

== Species ==
The following species are recognised in the genus Cogia:

- Cogia abdul Hayward, 1947
- Cogia azila Evans, 1953
- Cogia aziris (Hewitson, 1867)
- Cogia caicus (Herrich-Schäffer, 1869)
- Cogia calchas (Herrich-Schäffer, 1869)
- Cogia cerradicola (Mielke, 1967)
- Cogia crameri (McHenry, 1960)
- Cogia cursinoi (O. Mielke, 1979)
- Cogia elaites (Hewitson, 1867)
- Cogia eliasi (O. Mielke, 1979)
- Cogia galbula (Plötz, 1881)
- Cogia goya (Evans, 1952)
- Cogia grandis Riley, 1921
- Cogia hassan Butler, 1870
- Cogia hippalus (Edwards, 1882)
- Cogia hiska Evans, 1953
- Cogia moschus (Edwards, 1882)
- Cogia optica (Evans, 1952)
- Cogia outis (Skinner, 1894)
- Cogia punctilia Plötz, 1882
- Cogia stylites (Herrich-Schäffer, 1869)
- Cogia troilus Mabille, 1898
- Cogia undulatus (Hewitson, 1867)

== Biology ==
The larvae feed on Leguminosae including Acacia Indigofera, Mimosa and on Moraceae (Milicia)
