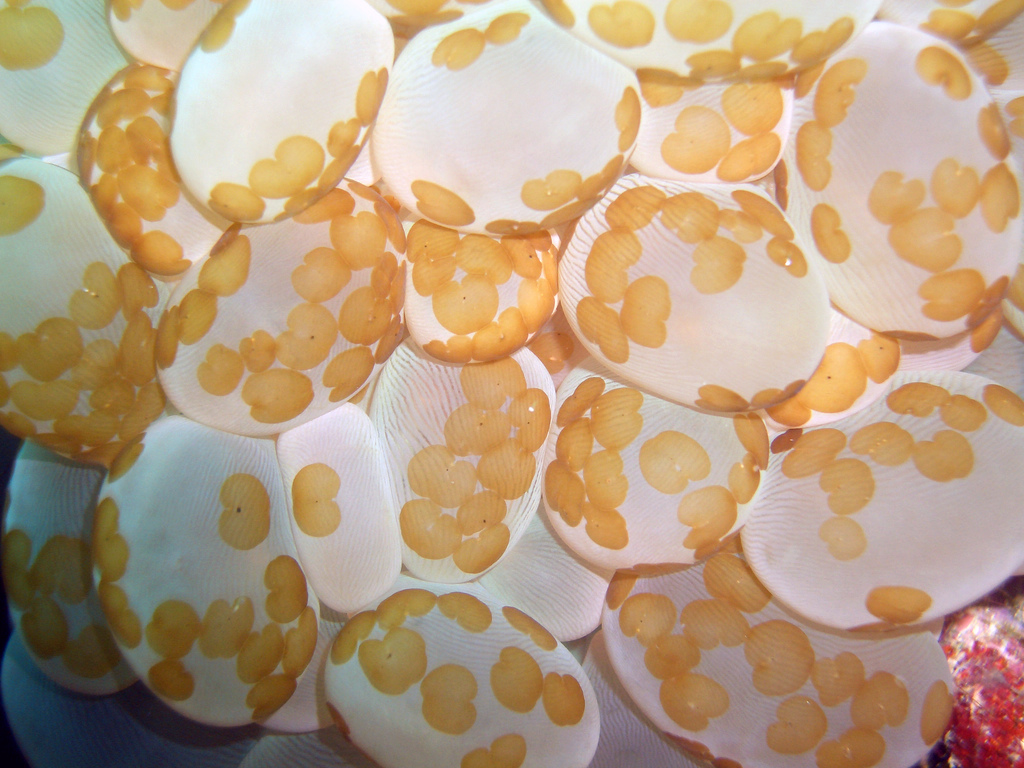
- Flatworm-like Waminoa sp. on Plerogyra sp.

Scientific classification
- Kingdom: Animalia
- Phylum: Xenacoelomorpha
- Order: Acoela
- Superfamily: Aberrantospermata
- Family: Convolutidae; Graff, 1905

Synonyms
- Anaperidae Dörjes, 1968; Sagittiferidae Kostenko & Mamkaev, 1990

= Convolutidae =

Convolutidae Temporal range: Middle Triassic–Recent

Family of acoels

Convolutidae is a family of acoels, belonging to the phylum Xenacoelomorpha. This family contains more than a third of all known acoel species.

== Description ==
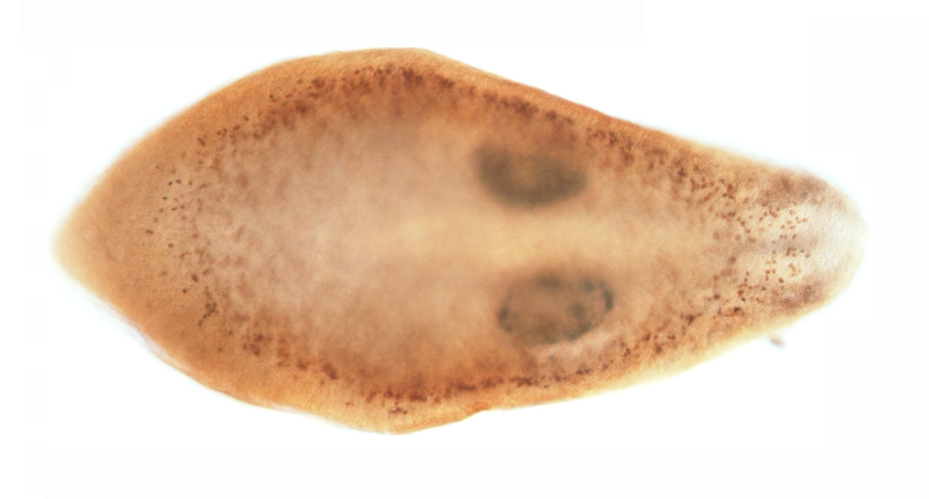
Neochildia fusca

The family Convolutidae includes acoels with a ventral mouth opening and a body-wall musculature composed both dorsally and ventrally of circular, longitudinal, and longitudinal crossover muscle fibers. The ventral body wall also has a group of U-shaped fibers. Most species are symbionts with algae. The anterior end has a cluster of frontal glands, a pair of eyes, and a statocyst. The body has a pigmented lens. The intestine and excretory system are absent. They are hermaphroditic, but protandry is common.

== Taxonomy ==
=== Genera ===
There are 26 genera in the family Convolutidae, of which 25 are extant. The type genus is Convoluta.

- †Gutticorpus Knaust, 2021
- Achoerus Beklemischev, 1914
- Adenopea Antonius, 1968
- Amphiscolops Graff, 1904
- Antrosagittifera Hooge & Tyler, 2001
- Brachypea Antonius, 1968
- Conaperta Antonius, 1968
- Convoluta Ørsted, 1843
- Convolutriloba Hendelberg & Akesson, 1988
- Haplodiscus Weldon, 1888
- Heterochaerus Haswell, 1905
- Neochildia Bush, 1975
- Oligochoerus Beklemischev, 1963
- Oxyposthia Ivanov, 1952
- Pelophila Dörjes, 1968
- Philachoerus Dörjes, 1968
- Polychoerus Mark, 1892
- Praesagittifera Kostenko & Mamkaev, 1990
- Pseudanaperus Dörjes, 1968
- Pseudoconvoluta Beklemischev, 1929
- Sagittifera Kostenko & Mamkaev, 1990
- Stomatricha Hooge, 2003
- Symsagittifera Kostenko & Mamkaev, 1990
- Thalassoanaperus Hernandez, 2018
- Waminoa Winsor, 1990
- Wulguru Winsor, 1988

=== Species ===
There are over 100 species recognised in the family Convolutidae:

- †Gutticorpus concentrica Knaust, 2021
- Achoerus caspius Beklemischev, 1914
- Achoerus ferox Beklemischev, 1937
- Achoerus pachycaudatus Dörjes, 1968
- Adenopea cenata (Du Bois-Reymond Marcus, 1955)
- Adenopea chuni (Brauner, 1920)
- Adenopea illardata Löhner & Micoletzky, 1911
- Adenopea illardatus (Lohner & Micoletzky, 1911)
- Amphiscolops bermudensis Hyman, 1939
- Amphiscolops castellonensis Steinböck, 1954
- Amphiscolops cinereus (Graff, 1874)
- Amphiscolops evelinae Marcus, 1947
- Amphiscolops fuligineus Peebles, 1913
- Amphiscolops gemelliporus Marcus, 1954
- Amphiscolops gerundensis Steinböck, 1954
- Amphiscolops japonicus Kato, 1947
- Amphiscolops marinelliensis Beltagi & Khafagi, 1984
- Amphiscolops mosaicus Kozloff, 1998
- Amphiscolops potocani Achatz, 2008
- Amphiscolops trifurcatus (Beltagi, 1983)
- Amphiscolops zeii Riedl, 1956
- Antrosagittifera corallina Hooge & Tyler, 2001
- Brachypea kenoma Antonius, 1968
- Conaperta antonii Achatz, Hooge & Tyler, 2007
- Conaperta cirrata Achatz, Hooge & Tyler, 2007
- Conaperta flavibacillum (Jensen, 1878)
- Conaperta lineata (Peebles, 1915)
- Convoluta albomaculata (Pereyaslawzewa, 1892)
- Convoluta baltica Meixner, 1938
- Convoluta bimaculata Graff, 1882
- Convoluta bohmigi (Brauner, 1920)
- Convoluta borealis Sabussow, 1900
- Convoluta boyeri Bush, 1984
- Convoluta chiridotae (Beklemischev, 1915)
- Convoluta confusa Graff, 1904
- Convoluta convoluta (Abildgaard, 1806)
- Convoluta enelitta Antonius, 1968
- Convoluta furugelmi Mamkaev, 1971
- Convoluta henseni Böhmig, 1895
- Convoluta hipparchia Pereyaslawzewa, 1892
- Convoluta kikaiensis Yamasu, 1982
- Convoluta krana Antonius, 1968
- Convoluta lacazii Graff, 1891
- Convoluta lacrimosa Achatz, Hooge & Tyler, 2007
- Convoluta marginalis Ivanov, 1952
- Convoluta maris-alba (Sabussow, 1899)
- Convoluta marisalbi Sabussov, 1900
- Convoluta naviculae Yamasu, 1982
- Convoluta niphoni Achatz, 2008
- Convoluta pelagica Lohner & Micoletzky, 1911
- Convoluta philippinensis Bush, 1984
- Convoluta punctata Riedl, 1959
- Convoluta pygopora Antonius, 1968
- Convoluta schmidti Czerniavsky, 1881
- Convoluta schuelii Achatz, 2008
- Convoluta semperi Graff, 1882
- Convoluta sordida Graff, 1882
- Convoluta thela (Antonius, 1968)
- Convoluta uljanini Graff, 1904
- Convoluta variabilis (Pereyaslawzewa, 1892)
- Convolutriloba hastifera Winsor, 1990
- Convolutriloba longifissura Bartolomaeus & Balzer, 1997
- Convolutriloba macropyga Shannon & Achatz, 2007
- Convolutriloba retrogemma Hendelberg & Akesson, 1988
- Haplodiscus acuminatus Böhmig, 1895
- Haplodiscus bocki Dörjes, 1970
- Haplodiscus incola (Leiper, 1902)
- Haplodiscus obtusus Böhmig, 1895
- Haplodiscus ovatus Böhmig, 1895
- Haplodiscus piger Weldon, 1888
- Haplodiscus ussovi Sabussow, 1896
- Haplodiscus weldoni Böhmig, 1895
- Heterochaerus australis Haswell, 1905
- Heterochaerus blumi (Achatz, Hooge & Tyler, 2007)
- Heterochaerus carvalhoi (Marcus, 1952)
- Heterochaerus langerhansi (Graff, 1882)
- Heterochaerus sargassi (Hyman, 1939)
- Neochildia fusca Bush, 1975
- Oligochoerus bakuensis Beklemischev, 1963
- Oligochoerus chlorella Beklemischev, 1963
- Oligochoerus conops Beklemischev, 1963
- Oligochoerus erythrophthalmus Beklemischev, 1963
- Oligochoerus limnophilus Ax & Doerjes, 1966
- Oligochoerus melanops Beklemischev, 1963
- Oligochoerus xanthella Beklemischev, 1963
- Oxyposthia praedator Ivanov, 1952
- Pelophila lutheri (Westblad, 1946)
- Philachoerus johanni Dörjes, 1968
- Praesagittifera gracilis (Yamasu, 1982)
- Praesagittifera naikaiensis (Yamasu, 1982)
- Praesagittifera shikoki Kostenko & Mamkaev, 1990
- Sagittifera sagittifera (Ivanov, 1952)
- Stomatricha hochbergi Hooge, 2003
- Thalassoanaperus australis (Westblad, 1952)
- Thalassoanaperus biaculeatus (Boguta, 1970)
- Thalassoanaperus gardineri (Graff, 1911)
- Thalassoanaperus ornatus (Beltagi, 2001)
- Thalassoanaperus rubellus (Westblad, 1945)
- Thalassoanaperus singularis (Hooge & Smith, 2004)
- Thalassoanaperus sulcatus (Beklemischev, 1914)
- Thalassoanaperus tvaerminnensis (Luther, 1912)
- Waminoa brickneri Ogunlana, Hooge, Tekle, Benayahu, Barneah & Tyler, 2005
- Waminoa litus Winsor, 1990
- Wulguru cuspidata Winsor, 1988
