= Budding =

Form of cellular asexual reproduction

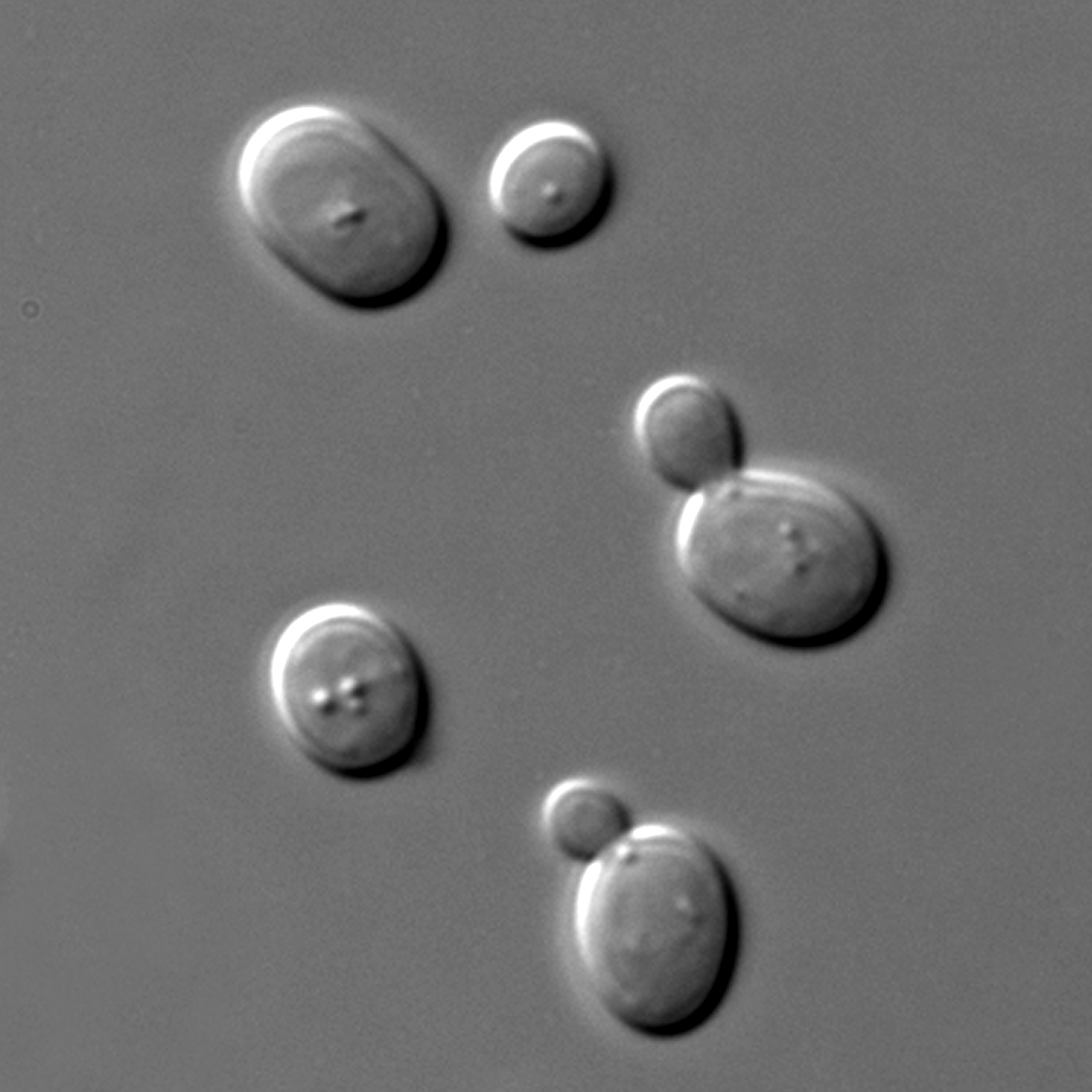
Saccharomyces cerevisiae reproducing by budding

Budding or blastogenesis is a type of asexual reproduction in which a new organism develops from an outgrowth or bud due to cell division at one particular site. For example, the small bulb-like projection coming out from the yeast cell is known as a bud. Since the reproduction is asexual, the newly created organism is a clone and, excepting mutations, is genetically identical to the parent organism. Organisms such as hydra use regenerative cells for reproduction in the process of budding.

In hydra, a bud develops as an outgrowth due to repeated cell division of the parent body at one specific site. These buds develop into tiny individuals and, when fully mature, detach from the parent body and become new independent individuals.

Internal budding or endodyogeny is a process of asexual reproduction, favored by parasites such as Toxoplasma gondii. It involves an unusual process in which two daughter cells are produced inside a mother cell, which is then consumed by the offspring prior to their separation.

Endopolygeny is the division into several organisms at once by internal budding.

== Cellular reproduction ==
Some cells divide asymmetrically by budding, for example Saccharomyces cerevisiae, the yeast species used in baking and brewing. This process results in a 'mother' cell and a smaller 'daughter' cell. Cryo-electron tomography recently revealed that mitochondria in cells divide by budding.

== Animal reproduction ==
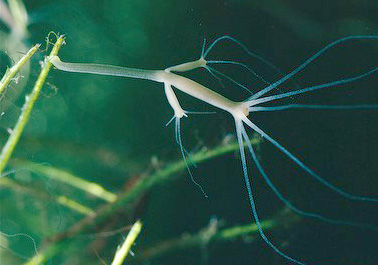
Hydra with two buds

Hydra budding: 1. Non-reproducing, 2. Creating a bud, 3. Daughter growing out, 4. Beginning to cleave, 5. Daughter broke off, 6. Daughter clone of parent

In some multicellular animals, offspring may develop as outgrowths of the mother. Animals that reproduce by budding include corals, some sponges, some acoels (for example, Convolutriloba), echinoderm larvae, placozoans, symbions, pterobranchians, entoproctans, some polychaetes, bryozoans, tunicates, flatworms and a single phoronid species.

== Colony division ==
Colonies of some bee species have also exhibited budding behavior, such as Apis dorsata. Although budding behavior is rare in this bee species, it has been observed when a group of workers leave the natal nest and construct a new nest usually near the natal one.

== Virology ==
In virology, budding is a form of viral shedding by which enveloped viruses acquire their external envelope from the host cell membrane, which bulges outwards and encloses the virion.

== Plant multiplication ==
In agriculture and horticulture, budding refers to grafting the bud of one plant onto another.

== See also ==
- Fragmentation (reproduction)
- Paratomy
- Fission (biology)
- Strobilation
