= Minicircle =

Small, circular replicating units of DNA

Minicircle preparation from a parental plasmid. The parental plasmid contains two recombinase target sites (black half arrows). Recombination between these sites generates the desired minicircle (bottom right) together with the miniplasmid (bottom left). The hook on the red minicircle-insert stands for a scaffold-matrix attachment region ( S/MAR-Element), which allows for autonomous replication in the recipient cell.

Minicircles are small (~4kb) circular replicons. They occur naturally in some eukaryotic organelle genomes. In the mitochondria-derived kinetoplast of trypanosomes, minicircles encode guide RNAs for RNA editing. In Amphidinium, the chloroplast genome is made of minicircles that encode chloroplast proteins.

== In vitro experimentally-derived minicircles ==
Minicircles are small (~4kb) circular plasmid derivatives that have been freed from all prokaryotic vector parts. They have been applied as transgene carriers for the genetic modification of mammalian cells, with the advantage that, since they contain no bacterial DNA sequences, they are less likely to be perceived as foreign and destroyed. (Typical transgene delivery methods involve plasmids, which contain foreign DNA.) The smaller size of minicircles also extends their cloning capacity and facilitates their delivery into cells.

Their preparation usually follows a two-step procedure:

- production of a 'parental plasmid' (bacterial plasmid with eukaryotic inserts) in E. coli
- induction of a site-specific recombinase at the end of this process but still in bacteria. These steps are followed by the
  - excision of prokaryotic vector parts via two recombinase-target sequences at both ends of the insert
  - recovery of the resulting minicircle (vehicle for the highly efficient modification of the recipient cell) and the miniplasmid by capillary gel electrophoresis (CGE)

The purified minicircle can be transferred into the recipient cell by transfection or lipofection and into a differentiated tissue by, for instance, jet injection.

Conventional minicircles lack an origin of replication, so they do not replicate within the target cells and the encoded genes will disappear as the cell divides (which can be either an advantage or disadvantage depending on whether the application demands persistent or transient expression). A novel addition to the field are nonviral self-replicating minicircles, which owe this property to the presence of a S/MAR-Element. Self-replicating minicircles hold great promise for the systematic modification of stem cells and will significantly extend the potential of their plasmidal precursor forms ("parental plasmids"), the more as the principal feasibility of such an approach has amply been demonstrated for their plasmidal precursor forms.

== See also ==
- Episomes – Type of plasmid
