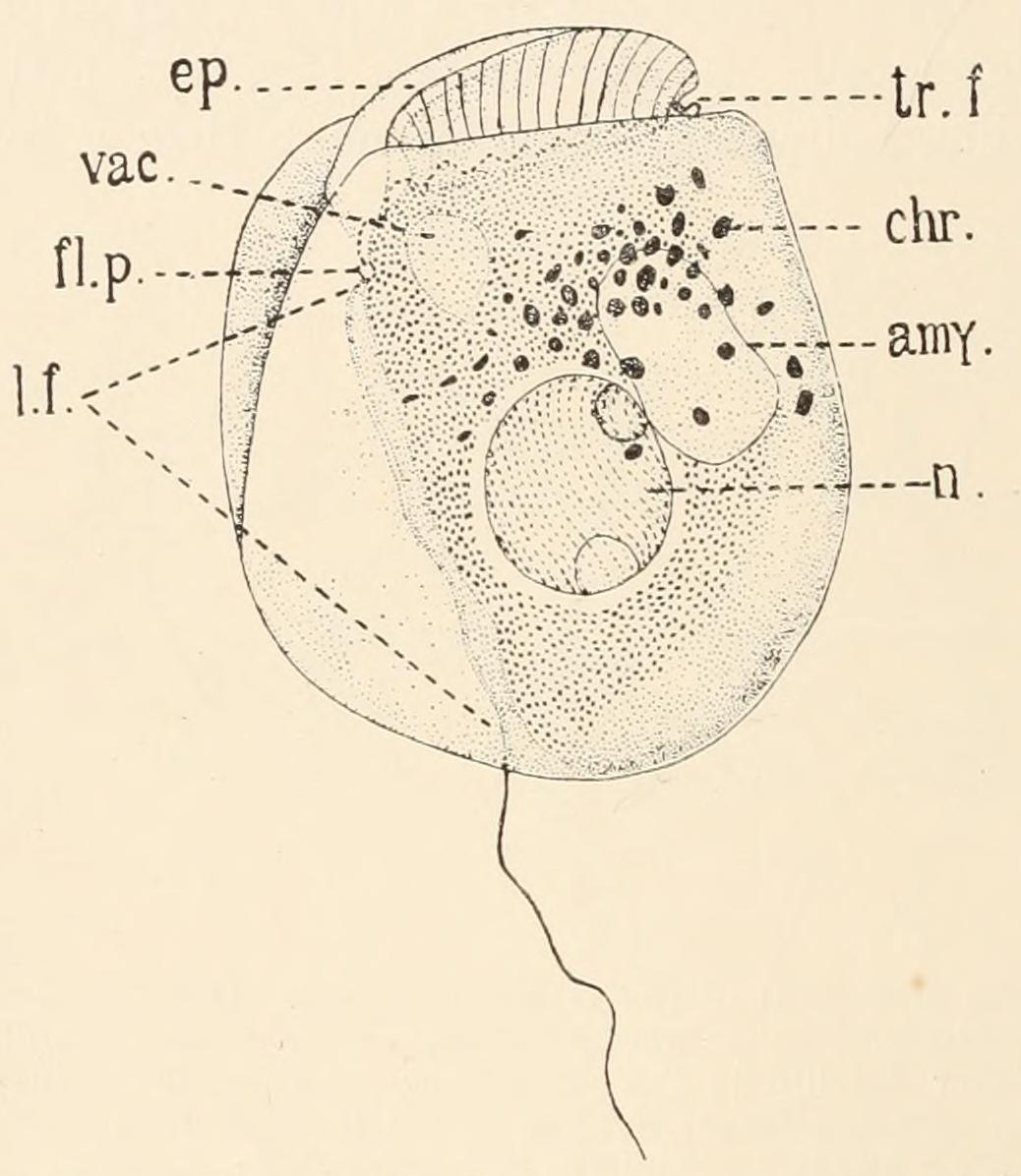
- Lateral view of Amphidinium sulcatum. amy., amyloid body; chr., chromatophore; ep., anterior part of cell in front of transverse furrow; fl.p., flagellar pore; l.f., longitudinal furrow; n., cell nucleus; tr.f., transverse furrow (with flagellum); vac., vacuole.

Scientific classification
- Domain: Eukaryota
- Clade: Sar
- Clade: Alveolata
- Phylum: Dinoflagellata
- Class: Dinophyceae
- Order: Gymnodiniales
- Family: Gymnodiniaceae
- Genus: Amphidinium; Clap. & J.Lachm. 1859

= Amphidinium =

Genus of dinoflagellates

Amphidinium is a genus of dinoflagellates. The type for the genus is Amphidinium operculatum Claparède & Lachmann. The genus includes the species Amphidinium carterae which is used as a model organism.

As dinoflagellates, Amphidinium spp. have chloroplasts. The Amphidinium chloroplast genome is unusual in not having a single contiguous circular genome. Instead, chloroplast genes encoded in chloroplast DNA are found on numerous 2-3 kbp minicircles, analogous to plasmids. Most minicircles have only a few protein-coding genes; many have just a single gene. There are reports of minicircles that do not have known transcripts, like in the Amphidinium carterae chloroplast genome, although these were not found in the Symbiodinium sp. Clade C3 chloroplast genome. Minicircle-derived transcripts can be processed in ways not typical of eukaryotes, including the addition of a 3' poly(U) tail, as opposed to the typical poly(A) tail derived from polyadenylation of eukaryotic transcripts. Minicircle-derived antisense transcripts are also produced, but without 3' poly(U) tails.

== See also ==
- Luteophanol, a type of amphidinol present in species of the genus.
