= Cutaneous leishmaniasis =

- Other names: Oriental sore, tropical sore, Chiclero ulcer, Chiclero's ulcer, Aleppo boil, Delhi boil, or desert boil
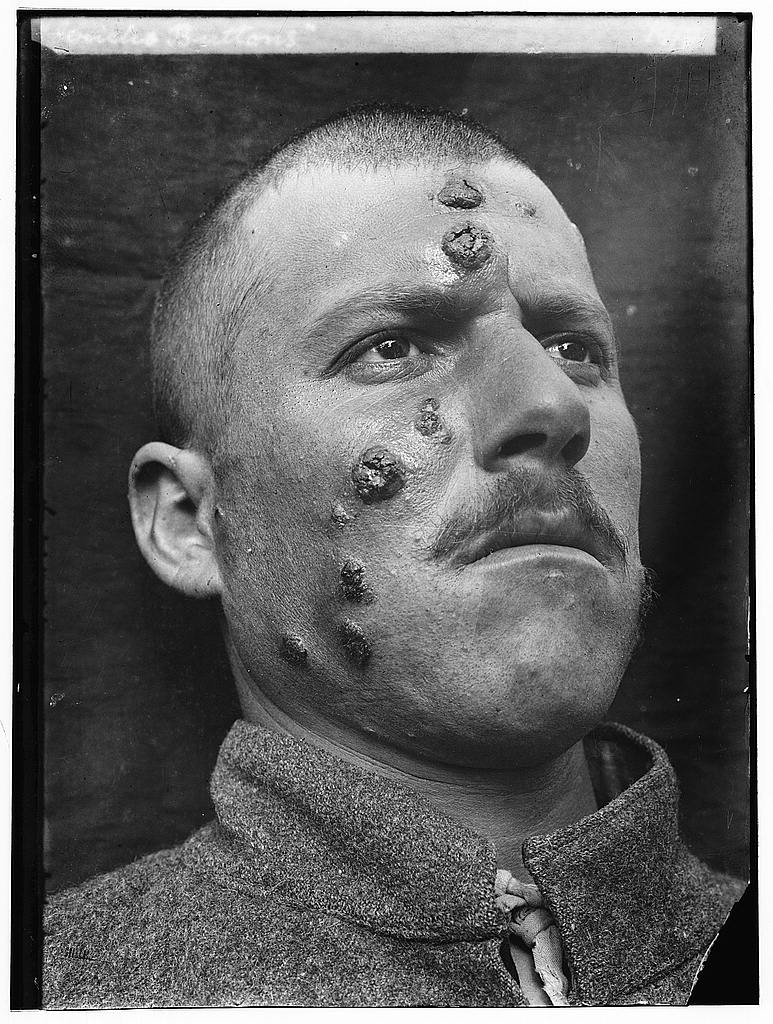
- A man with cutaneous leishmaniasis in the Middle East, known then locally as "Jericho buttons" for the frequency of cases near the ancient city of Jericho
- Specialty: Infectious diseases

Cutaneous leishmaniasis is the most common form of leishmaniasis affecting humans. It is a skin infection caused by a single-celled parasite that is transmitted by the bite of a phlebotomine sand fly. About 30 species of Leishmania may cause cutaneous leishmaniasis. This disease is considered to be a zoonosis (an infectious disease that is naturally transmissible from animals to humans), with the exception of Leishmania tropica, which is often an anthroponotic disease (an infectious disease that is naturally transmissible from humans to vertebrate animals).

== Signs and symptoms ==
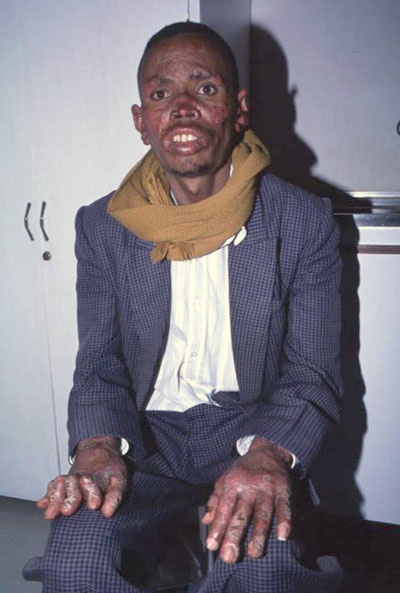
Skin lesions from cutaneous leishmaniasis may closely resemble those seen in leprosy.

=== Post kala-azar dermal leishmaniasis ===
Post-kala-azar dermal leishmaniasis (PKDL) is a recurrence of kala-azar that may appear on the skin of affected individuals months and up to 20 years after being partially treated, untreated, or even in those considered adequately treated. In Sudan, they can be demonstrated in up to 60% of treated cases. They manifest as hypopigmented skin lesions (such as macules, papules, or nodules), or facial redness. Though any organism causing kala-azar can lead to PKDL, it is commonly associated with L. donovani. which gives different disease patterns in India and Sudan. In the Indian variant, nodules enlarge with time and form plaques, but rarely ulcerate, while nodules from the African variety often ulcerate as they progress. Nerve involvement is common in the African variety, but rare on the Indian subcontinent. Histology demonstrates a mixture of chronic inflammatory cells, with macrophage or epitheloid granuloma possible. Parasite concentration is not consistent among studies, perhaps reflecting low sensitivity of diagnostic methods used in earlier entries.

The current approach to diagnosis involves:

- Demonstration of parasite by microscopy, in vitro culture, or animal inoculation
- Immunodiagnosis of parasite antigen
- Detection of parasite DNA in tissue

Newer polymerase chain reaction-based tools have higher sensitivity and specificity. Emergence of PKDL has been reported in HIV-affected individuals, and may become a problem in the future.

Sodium stibogluconate alone or in combination with rifampicin is used for the treatment of PKDL for a long course of up to 4 months. Compliance can be an issue for such a long course.

=== Mucocutaneous leishmaniasis ===
Mucocutaneous leishmaniasis is an especially disturbing form of cutaneous leishmaniasis, because it produces destructive and disfiguring lesions of the face. It is most often caused by L. braziliensis, but cases caused by L. aethiopica have also been described.

Mucocutaneous leishmaniasis is very difficult to treat. Treatment involves the use of pentavalent antimonial compounds, which are highly toxic (common side effects include thrombophlebitis, pancreatitis, cardiotoxicity, and hepatotoxicity) and not very effective. For example, in one study, despite treatment with high doses of sodium stibogluconate for 28 days, only 30% of patients remained disease-free at their 12-month follow-up. Even in those patients who achieve an apparent cure, as many as 19% will relapse. Several drug combinations with immunomodulators have been tested; for example, a combination of pentoxifylline (inhibitor of TNF-α) and a pentavalent antimonial at a high dose for 30 days in a small-scale (23 patients), randomised placebo-controlled study from Brazil achieved cure rates of 90% and reduced time to cure, a result that should be interpreted cautiously in light of inherent limitations of small-scale studies. In an earlier small-scale (12 patients) study, addition of imiquimod showed promising results, which need to be confirmed in larger trials.

== Pathophysiology ==
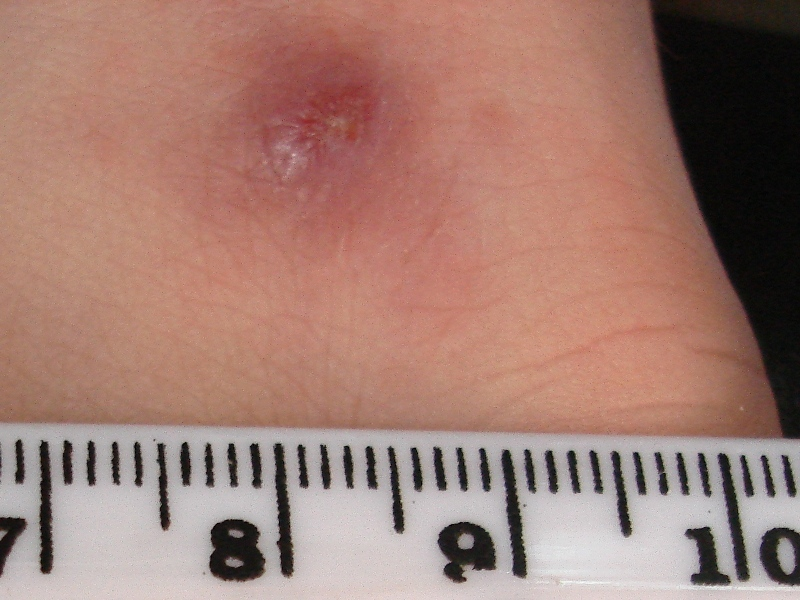
Cutaneous leishmaniasis

Promastigotes of Leishmania are transmitted to human skin by the bite of a sandfly. Leishmania parasites then invade human macrophages and replicate intracellularly. A raised, red lesion develops at the site of the bite (often weeks or sometimes years afterwards). The lesion then ulcerates and may become secondarily infected with bacteria. In many species (for example, L. major), the lesion often spontaneously heals with atrophic scarring. In some species (for example, L. braziliensis), the lesion may spontaneously heal with scarring, but then reappear elsewhere (especially as destructive mucocutaneous lesions). Lesions of other Leishmania species may spontaneously heal and then reappear as satellite lesions around the site of the original lesion, or along the route of lymphatic drainage.

Some species tend to cause cutaneous leishmaniasis (e.g., L. major and L. tropica), whereas other species tend to cause visceral leishmaniasis (e.g., L. infantum and L. donovani), though emerging research (due to high deployment rates of western countries to indigenous areas) is showing these species-specific presentation lines are blurring.

== Diagnosis ==
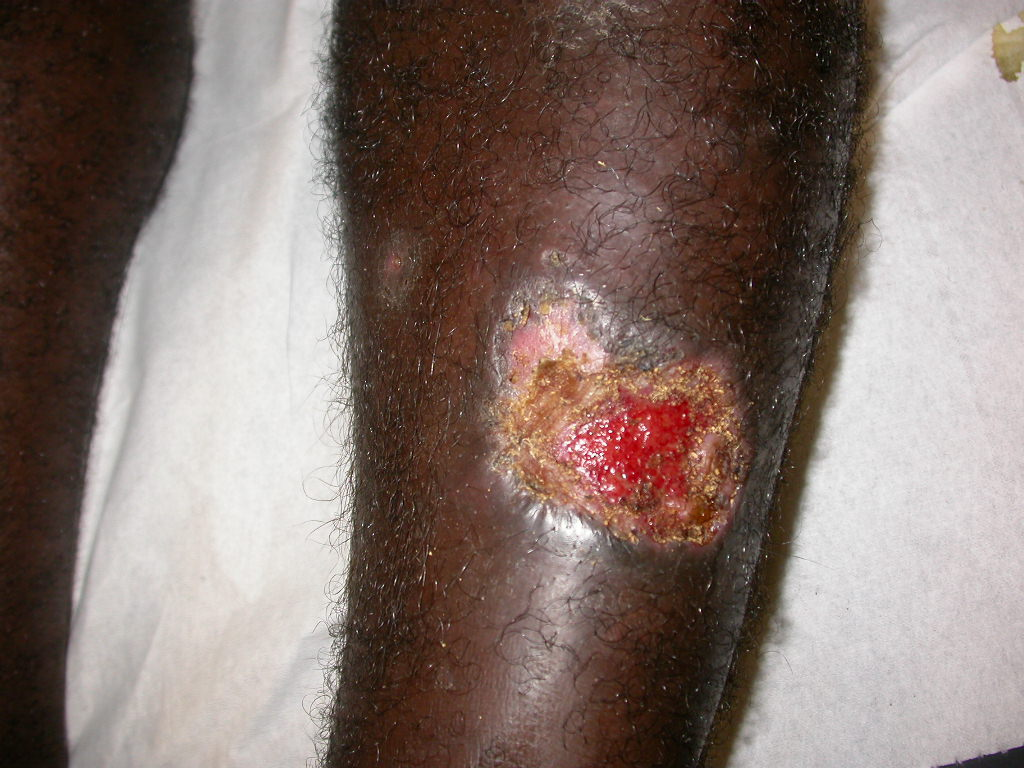
Cutaneous leishmaniasis in a man from French Guiana

Diagnosis is based on the characteristic appearance of non-healing, raised, scaling lesions that may ulcerate and become secondarily infected with organisms such as Staphylococcus aureus, in someone who has returned from an endemic area.

In resource-limited settings, fine-needle aspiration of the lesion is confirmatory with identification of amastigote form of Leishmania. The gold standard for diagnosis is a polymerase chain reaction test.

== Prevention ==
The sand fly stings mainly at night, and it usually occurs about half a meter above the ground (so sleeping on high beds can prevent infection). To avoid stinging, apply mosquito repellent, and cover the body.

Studies conducted in recent years show that the plant Bougainvillea glabra may protect against the sand fly. The plant was found to be toxic to sand flies and that the lifespan of flies that ate from this plant was significantly shortened and sometimes led to their premature death, before they could spread the disease.

A Hebrew University study found that some plants attract sand flies. These plants often attract them up to 14 times more than B. glabra, but unlike B. a. glabra, are not toxic to the sand flies. Based on this information, the dispersion of sand flies can be controlled by limiting the growth of these plants near populated areas. Alternatively, these plants may serve to capture and control sand flies by using their odor compounds or the plants themselves alongside simple glue traps, or by spraying them with deadly pesticides for sand flies that are safe for humans and mammals (e.g., boric acid or spinosad), thereby stopping the spread of the disease. Of the dozens of plants examined, the plants that attracted especially sand flies are Ochradenus baccatus, Prosopis farcta, and Tamarix nilotica.

== Treatment ==
=== American ===
The best treatment for American cutaneous and mucocutaneous leishmaniasis (ACML) is not known. Pentavalent antimonial drugs (sodium stibogluconate (SSG) and meglumine antimonate (Glucantime, MA)) have been used since the 1940s, but they are expensive, toxic, and painful. Treatments that work for one species of Leishmania may not work for another; so, the exact species must be identified prior to initiating treatment. Leishmaniasis is an orphan disease in developed nations, and almost all the current treatment options are toxic with significant side effects.

The best-studied treatments for ACML caused by two Leishmania species are listed below. Most of the studies examining treatments of ACML, of note, were poorly designed. No definitive treatment guidelines or recommendations are currently available, though, as large-scale and well-conducted studies are necessary to evaluate the long-term effects of current treatments.

- L. braziliensis and L. panamensis: Good evidence supports that oral allopurinol plus intramuscular MA are superior to either medication alone. In addition, a 20-day course of intravenous MA was better than a 7-day course, as well as a 3- or 7-day course of intravenous MA with paromomycin + 12% methylbenzethonium chloride.
- For L. braziliensis, oral pentoxifylline plus intravenous SSG seem to be more efficacious than intravenous SSG alone, and intravenous MA was superior to intramuscular paromomycin sulfate and IV pentamidine. Likewise, intramuscular MA was shown to be better than the Bacillus Calmette-Guerin vaccine.
- For L. panamensis, oral ketoconazole, oral miltefosine, and topical paromomycin + 12% methylbenzethonium chloride were shown to be superior to placebo.

No strong evidence indicates the efficacy of surgery, oral itraconazole and fluconazole, oral antibiotics (rifampicin, metronidazole, cotrimoxazole), intravenous or topical amphotericin B, oral dapsone, photodynamic therapy, promoting healing therapies, laser, or cryotherapy treatments.

=== Old World ===
Similar to ACML, the treatment recommendations for Old World cutaneous leishmaniasis (OWCL) are uncertain due to the variability of and inconsistencies within the research. Most studies done to assess treatments of OWCL included two species of parasites, L. major and L. tropica. The most well-studied treatments for OWCL are oral itraconazole and topical paromomycin. Patients treated with oral itraconazole for an average of 2.5 months had a higher cure rate compared to placebo, but they also had a higher rate of side effects, including gastrointestinal complaints, abnormal liver function, headaches, and dizziness. Patients treated with topical paromomycin showed no difference in cure rate compared to placebo, but patients treated with paromomycin had a higher rate of adverse skin reactions.

The treatments for other Leishmania species responsible for OWCL, such as L. infantum, L. aethiopica, and L. donovani, have not been thoroughly studied. In addition, the effects of leishmaniasis treatment in children, women of childbearing age, patients with comorbidities, and immunocompromised patients have not been well established.

== Epidemiology ==
Countries where cutaneous leishmaniasis is endemic

Cutaneous leishmaniasis is endemic in all tropical and subtropical areas of the world. The distribution of this disease is very tightly linked to geography, and villages even 15 miles apart can have very different rates of cutaneous leishmaniasis.

Most species of Leishmania are capable of infecting humans and causing cutaneous leishmaniasis. In the New World, these organisms include L. amazonensis, L. braziliensis, L. guyanensis, L. lainsoni, L. lindenbergi, L. mexicana, L. naiffi, L. panamensis, L. peruviana, L. shawi, and L. venezuelensis. Old World species that cause cutaneous leishmaniasis include L. aethiopica, L. infantum, L. major, and L. tropica. With the exception of L. tropica—which is commonly associated with human settlements and therefore considered to be an anthroponotic species—all of these organisms are zoonotic. As demographic changes occur in developing nations, some species that have traditionally been considered to be zoonotic (e.g., L. panamensis) are becoming primarily human pathogens.

Dogs and rodents serve as the primary animal reservoir hosts in the sylvatic cycle, but people with chronic PKDL can also serve as important reservoir hosts for cutaneous leishmaniasis. The most common vectors for cutaneous leishmaniasis in the Old World are sandflies of the genus Phlebotomus, while Lutzomyia and those within the family Psychodidae (especially the genus Psychodopygus) are the most common vectors in the New World. More than 600 species of phlebotomine sandflies are known, but only 30 of these are known to be vectors. Cutaneous leishmaniasis has been seen in American and Canadian troops coming back from Afghanistan.

=== MENA ===
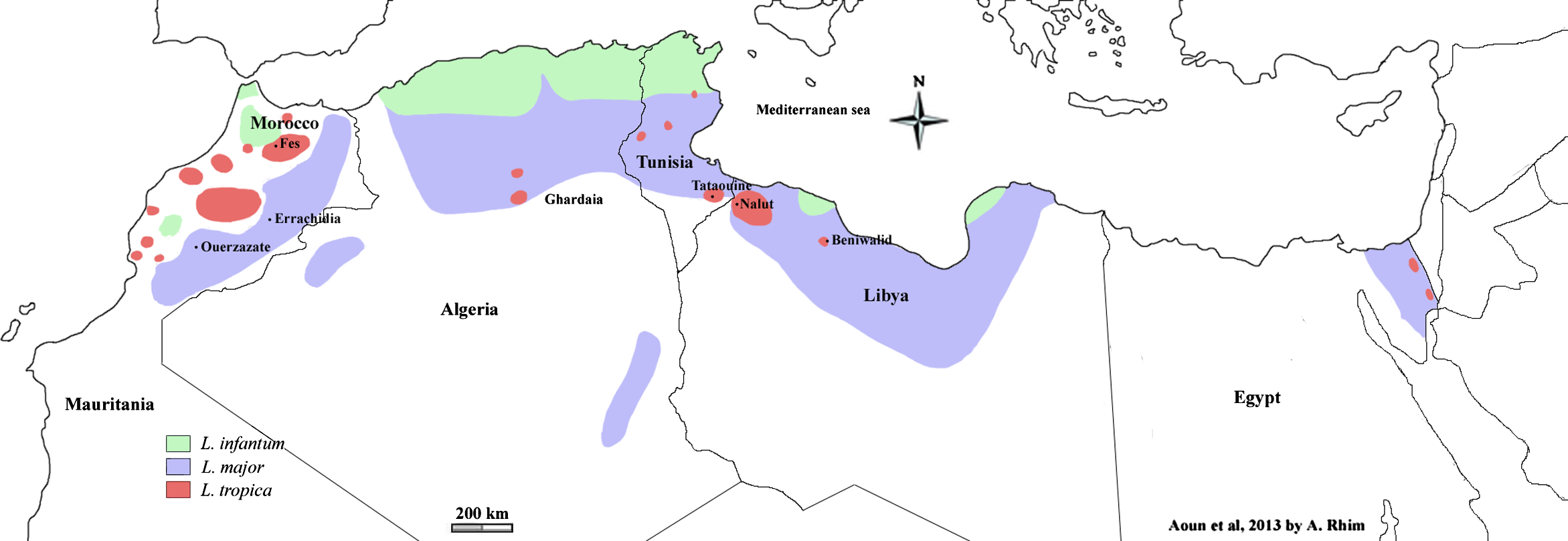
Cutaneous leishmaniasis in North Africa: L. infantum=green, L. major=blue, L. tropica=red

==== History ====
Cutaneous leishmaniasis is endemic to Syria and other countries in the Middle East and North Africa. As of 2021, Syria had the highest prevalence of cutaneous leishmaniasis in the world. The first reported case of cutaneous leishmaniasis in Syria was as early as 1745. The earliest mentions of cutaneous leishmaniasis can be found in a collection of ancient Egyptian medical documents known as the Ebers Papyrus, where a skin condition known as "Nile Pimple" is reported. Through history, the disease has been known by different names, usually relating to where the disease is endemic. For example, it has been referred to as Oriental sore, Aleppo boil, Baghdad boil and Jericho boil. Since ancient times in the Middle East children were inoculated with the L. major form of cutaneous leishmaniasis in active sores on the buttocks, resulting in both lifelong protection from reinfection as well as benign lesions to prevent potential disfiguring scarring in the future. In his 1792 book, The Natural History of Aleppo, Scottish physician and naturalist Alexander Russell reported that the Arabic name for the disease was "Habt il senne" or year-long boil. According to Russell, it was believed at the time to be spread through water sources.

==== Prior to 2011 ====
There were no records of cases of cutaneous leishmaniasis before 1950 in Syria, and until 1960, the disease was endemic only to Aleppo, Damascus, and off the banks of the river Euphrates. The National Leishmaniasis Control Program was established in 1985, and focused on the control of vectors and reservoirs; establishing services such as laboratory diagnosis and the treatment of cases; as well as releasing monthly reports of cases in order to monitor trends and spreads. Cases rose in the early 1990s, which is believed to be due to rapid urbanisation and migration form rural to urban areas. There was a sharp increase in reporting from 3,900 cases reported in 1998 to 6,275 in 2002. From 2004 to 2008, reports showed a constant annual incidence of 23,000 cases per year. In a 2010 report on neglected infectious diseases, it was reported by WHO that cases had risen to 25,000, making Syria one of the most affected countries that year.

==== Since 2011 ====
Cases were already increasing prior to the Arab Spring protests of 2011 and subsequent civil war, and were exacerbated due to the breakdown of government systems. This is evidenced from the pre-war reports, in which there was already a significant increase in cases recorded. Both leishmaniasis caused by L. major and L. tropica are present in Syria. Consequently, the disease is transmitted in two ways: through a person-sandfly-person chain of transmission in the case of L. tropica and through rodent-sandfly-person in the case of L. major. Cutaneous leishmaniasis caused by L. major has an incubation period of less than four months, while L. tropica is from two to eight months, further complicating the prevention of transmission. As is recorded with other neglected tropical diseases, armed conflicts enable outbreaks due to the collapse of systems and population displacement. The forced migration of populations can lead to exposure of non- immune populations to infection, allowing cutaneous leishmaniasis to change from "a sporadic threat to an epidemic threat." The increase in cases is not only due to migration alone, and rather can be understood as being caused by a combination of factors such as environmental conditions, the breakdown of control measures, collapse of the health care system and the loss of healthcare workers. Other factors that have led to the spread of cutaneous leishmaniasis specifically include: poor housing, poor medical facilities, high rodent density, overcrowding, poor sanitary conditions and climate changes. Between 2010 and 2018, the incidence rate of cutaneous leishmaniasis more than doubled from 20.08 to 44.99.

Due to the rates of infection amongst Syrian refugees fleeing conflict zones, there has been an increase in reported cases in Lebanon, Turkey and Jordan. The majority of these cases are restricted to the refugee population, and are spread due to poor conditions in refugee camps. In 2012, an outbreak of cutaneous leishmaniasis was reported in Lebanon. Prior to the civil war in Syria, cases in Lebanon ranged from 0 to 6 between 2005 and 2011, whereas in 2012 there were 1,275 cases. In 2013, out of a total of 1,033 cases, 988 or 96.6% were among the refugee population. Similarly, in 2014, 65.3% of reported cases were Syrian refugees where as in 2015 and 2017, the cases ranged between 81.1 and 89.6%. While migration due to displacement is the main reason for the spread of cutaneous leishmaniasis in Lebanon, the spread is exacerbated by the conditions of refugee camps and settlements. There is concern that the high number of refugees in similar environmental conditions could result in the sandfly vector finding permanent habitat in Lebanon. In the case of Türkiye, cutaneous leishmaniasis is endemic to south-eastern Anatolia, and there has been an increased prevalence in cases due to the influx of Syrian refugees along with the already existent endemic population. Similar to the situation in Lebanon, the majority of cases concern Syrian refugees. A study found that there were more female patients of cutaneous leishmaniasis and attributed this to the higher number of female refugees in the camp, on account that "the majority of males in this particular population remained in their home country or died in the civil war". In contrast, a study in Jordan found that the disease was marginally more prevalent amongst male refugees than females (54.8% and 45.2%). In Jordan, refugee camps are often overpopulated, creating a strain on resources such as water, sanitation and medical care. One study which looked at 558 cases reported from 2010 to 2016 found that the majority (92.1%) had been infected before entry to Jordan.

=== Nepal ===
A recent study with a large series of cases from the midwestern region of Nepal has demonstrated that cutaneous leishmaniasis is an under-recognized medical condition posing health challenges, mandating new guidelines for its reduction and eradication.

== Other animals ==
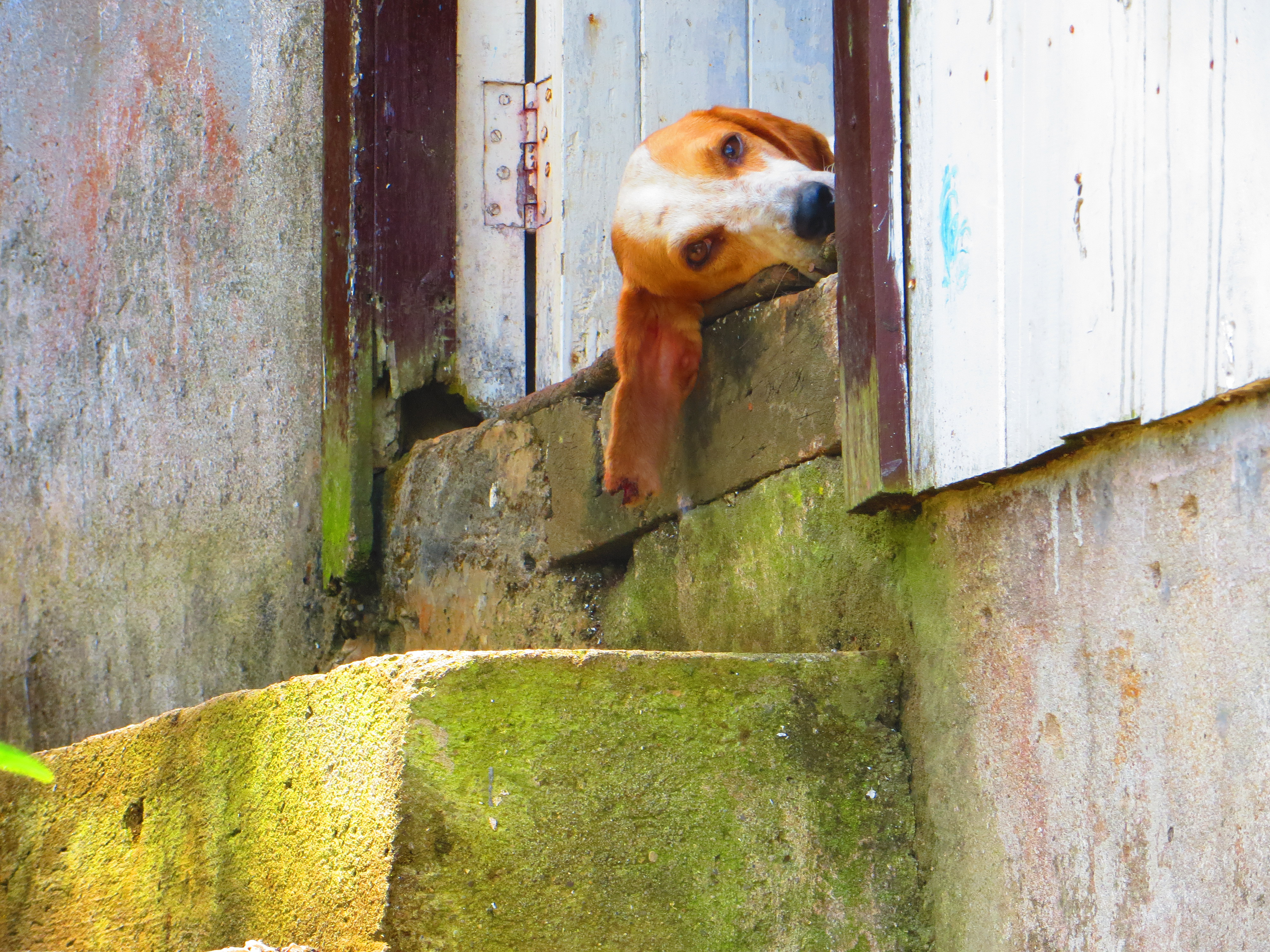
A dog in Nicaragua with cutaneous leishmaniasis affecting the ear

Besides humans, cutaneous leishmaniasis often affects other animals, notably in dogs as canine leishmaniasis.
