= Glass of antimony =

Glass of antimony, vitrum antimonii, is a yellow to red, translucent glass created from a preparation of antimony, though historically used as an emetic, the glass was a subject of much interest from alchemists due to its unusual properties. It was created using crude antimony, ground and calcined by a vehement fire, in an earthen crucible, until it no longer fumed, indicating that its sulfur was evaporated. The remaining substance (antimony trioxide) was then vitrified in a wind furnace, and stirred with an iron rod, upon which it became translucent and displayed a ruddy and shining yellow-red color.

It has been considered the strongest emetic of any preparation of antimony. Yet, if dissolved in spirit of urine, it ceased to be either emetic or cathartic.

== See also ==
- Antimonial
- Antimonial cup
