= Antimony potassium tartrate =

Antimony potassium tartrate trihydrate
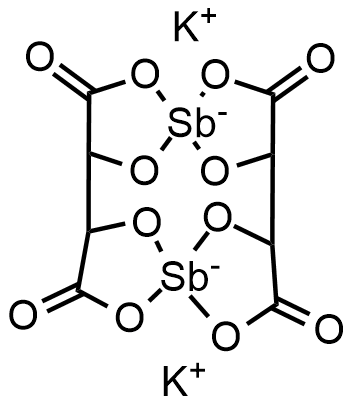

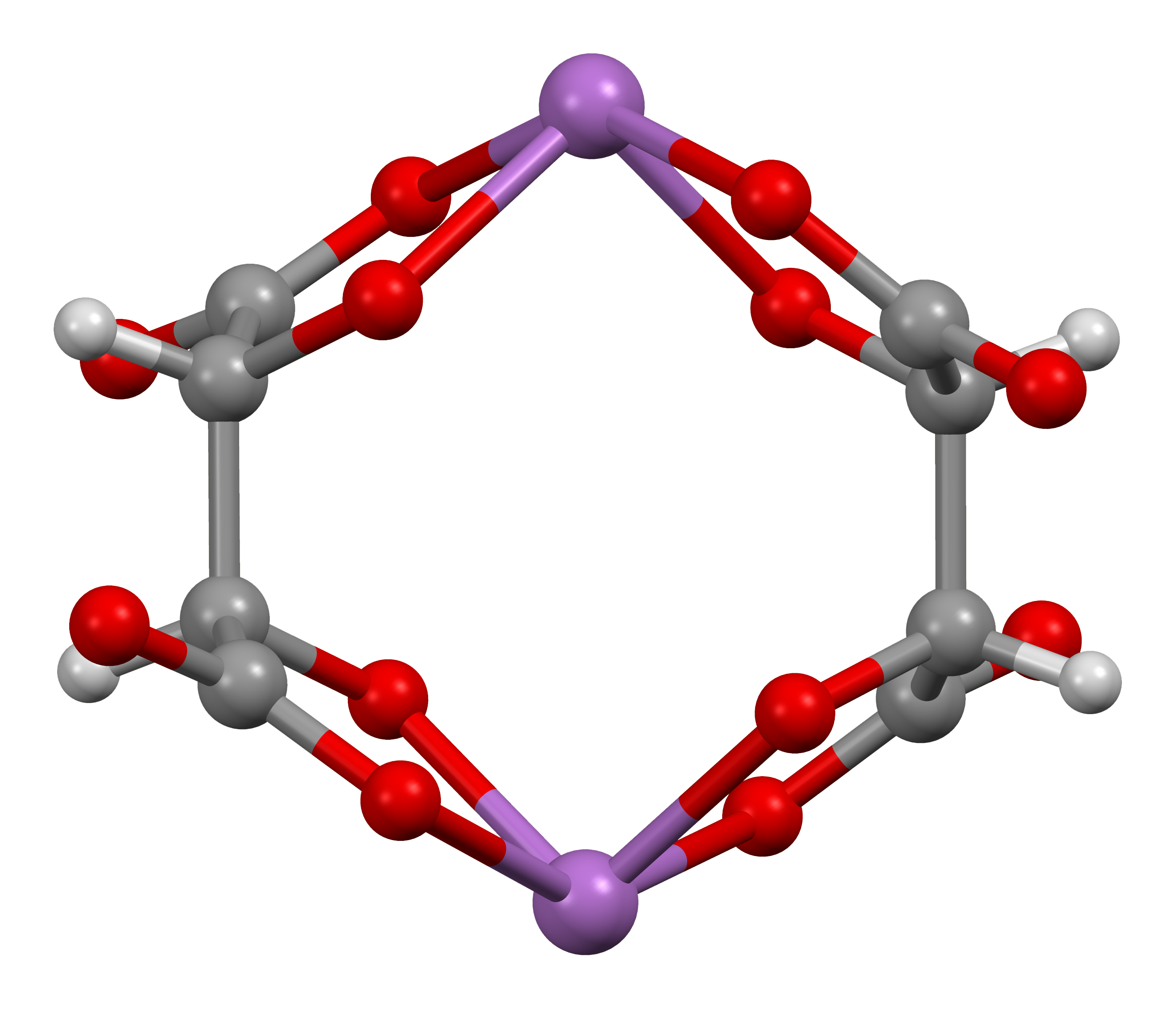
- Ball-and-stick model of the bis(μ_{2}-tartrato)-di-antimony anion, [Sb_{2}(C_{4}H_{2}O_{6})_{2}]^{2−} Carbon Hydrogen Oxygen Antimony

Names
- Other names potassium antimonyl tartrate emetic tartar tartar emetic

Identifiers
CAS Number	28300-74-5
3D model (JSmol)	Interactive image
ChEBI	CHEBI:2761
ChemSpider	17214979
ECHA InfoCard	100.116.333
EC Number	234-293-3
Gmelin Reference	1332600
KEGG	C11340
PubChem CID	16682736
UNII	DL6OZ476V3
CompTox Dashboard (EPA)	DTXSID3039240
- InChI: InChI=1S/2C4H4O6.2K.3H2O.2Sb/c2*5-1(3(7)8)2(6)4(9)10;;;;;;;/h2*1-2H,(H,7,8)(H,9,10);;;3*1H2;;/q2*-2;2*+1;;;;2*+3/p-4 Key: WBTCZEPSIIFINA-UHFFFAOYSA-J
- SMILES: [K+].[K+].O.O.O.O=C1O[Sb-]23OC1C1O[Sb-]4(OC(C(O2)C(=O)O3)C(=O)O4)OC1=O

Properties
Chemical formula	K_{2}Sb_{2}(C_{4}H_{2}O_{6})_{2} · 3 H_{2}O
Molar mass	667.87 g/mol
Appearance	white crystalline powder
Density	2.6 g/cm^{3}
Solubility in water	8.3 g/100 mL (0 °C); 35.9 g/100 mL (100 °C)

Hazards
- GHS labelling
Pictograms	(GHS07: Exclamation mark) (GHS09: Environmental hazard)
Signal word	Warning
- Lethal dose or concentration (LD, LC)
LD_{50} (median dose)	110 mg/kg
- Except where otherwise noted, data are given for materials in their standard state (at 25 °C [77 °F], 100 kPa). Infobox references

Antimony potassium tartrate, also known as potassium antimonyl tartrate, potassium antimontarterate, or tartar emetic, has the formula K_{2}Sb_{2}(C_{4}H_{2}O_{6})_{2}. The compound has long been known as a powerful emetic, and was once used in the treatment of schistosomiasis and leishmaniasis. It is used as a resolving agent. It typically is obtained as a hydrate.

== Medical ==
The first treatment application against trypanosomiasis was tested in 1906, and the compound's use to treat other tropical diseases was researched. The treatment of leishmania with antimony potassium tartrate started in 1913. After the introduction of antimony(V) containing complexes like sodium stibogluconate and meglumine antimoniate, the use of antimony potassium tartrate was phased out. After British physician John Brian Christopherson's discovery in 1918 that antimony potassium tartrate could cure schistosomiasis, the antimonial drugs became widely used. However, the injection of antimony potassium tartrate had severe side effects such as Adams–Stokes syndrome and therefore alternative substances were under investigation. With the introduction and subsequent larger use of praziquantel in the 1970s, antimony-based treatments fell out of use.

Tartar emetic was used in the late 19th and early 20th century as a patent medicine/folk remedy for alcohol intoxication, but was banned in the United States in 1941, in United States v. 11 1/4 Dozen Packages of Articles Labeled in Part Mrs. Moffat's Shoo-Fly Powders for Drunkenness.

In 2012, the New England Journal of Medicine reported a case study of a patient whose wife secretly gave him a dose of a product called "tartaro emetico" which contained trivalent antimony (antimony potassium tartrate) and is sold in Central America as an aversive treatment for alcohol use disorder. The patient, who had been out drinking the night before, developed persistent vomiting shortly after being given orange juice with the drug. When admitted to the hospital, and later in the intensive care unit, he experienced severe chest pains, cardiac abnormalities, renal and hepatic toxicity, and nearly died. The Journal reports that "Two years later, he [the patient] reports complete abstinence from alcohol."

=== Emetic ===
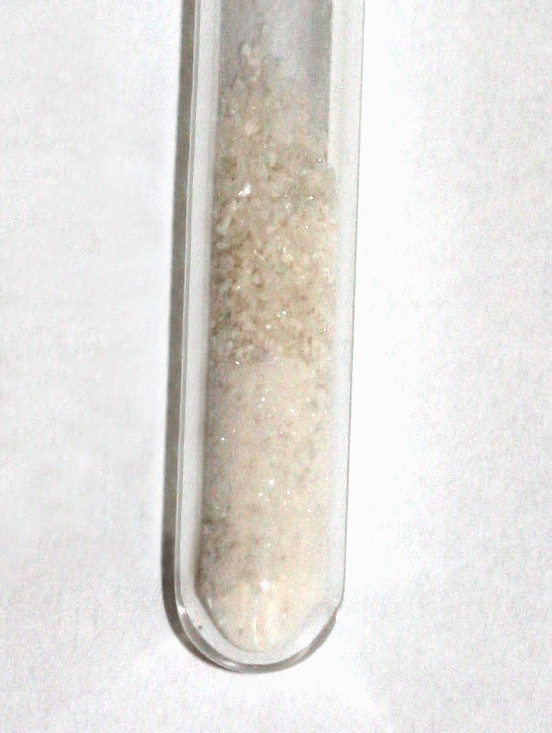
500 mg tartar emetic

Antimony potassium tartrate's potential as an emetic has been known since the Middle Ages. The compound itself was considered toxic and therefore a different way to administer it was found. Cups made from pure antimony were used to store wine for 24 hours and then the resulting solution of antimony potassium tartrate in wine was consumed in small portions until the wanted emetic effect was reached.

Poisoning by "tartarised antimony" or "emetic tartar" is a plot device in the first modern detective novel, The Notting Hill Mystery (1862). The emetic tartar was kept by a character in the novel because he was "addicted to the pleasures of the table, and was in the habit of taking an occasional emetic."

The compound is still used to induce vomiting in captured animals in order to study their diets.

=== Insecticide ===
Antimony potassium tartrate is used as an insecticide against thrips. It is in IRAC class 8E.

== Preparation, structure, reactions ==
Antimony potassium tartrate is prepared by heating a mixture of potassium hydrogen tartrate and antimony trioxide:

2 KOH + Sb_{2}O_{3} + 2 (HOCHCO_{2}H)_{2} → K_{2}Sb_{2}(C_{4}H_{2}O_{6})_{2} + 5 H_{2}O

With an excess of tartaric acid, the monoanionic monoantimony salt is produced:

2 KOH + Sb_{2}O_{3} + 4 (HOCHCO_{2}H)_{2} → 2 KSb(C_{4}H_{4}O_{6})_{2} + 5 H_{2}O

Antimony potassium tartrate has been the subject of several X-ray crystallography studies. The core complex is an anionic dimer of antimony tartrate (Sb_{2}(C_{4}H_{2}O_{6})_{2}^{2-}) which is arranged in a large ring with the carbonyl groups pointing outwards. The complex has D_{2} molecular symmetry with two Sb(III) centers bonded in distorted square pyramids. Water and potassium ions are held within the unit cell but are not tightly bound to the dimer. The anion is a well-used resolving agent.

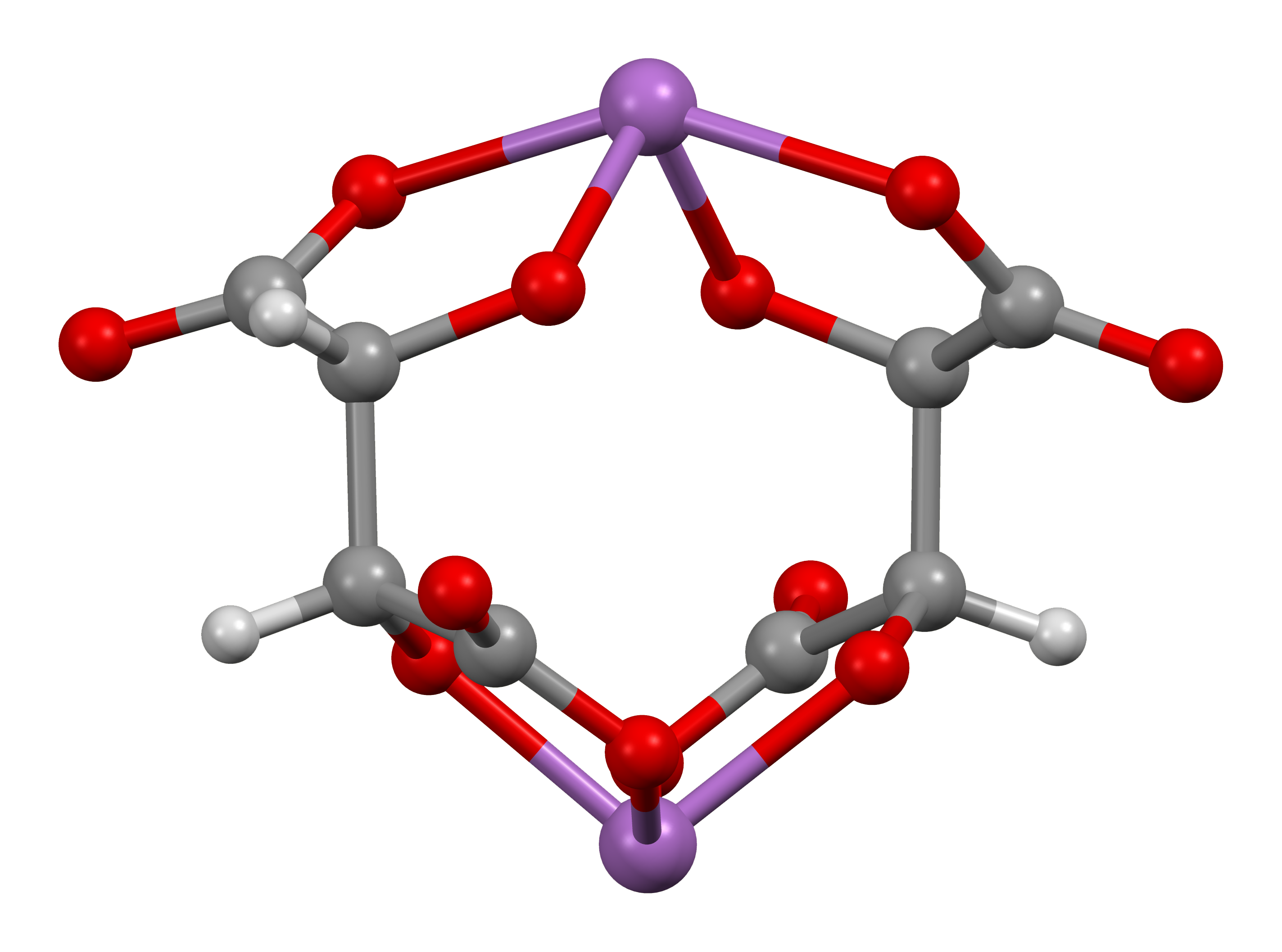
Viewed along the x axis

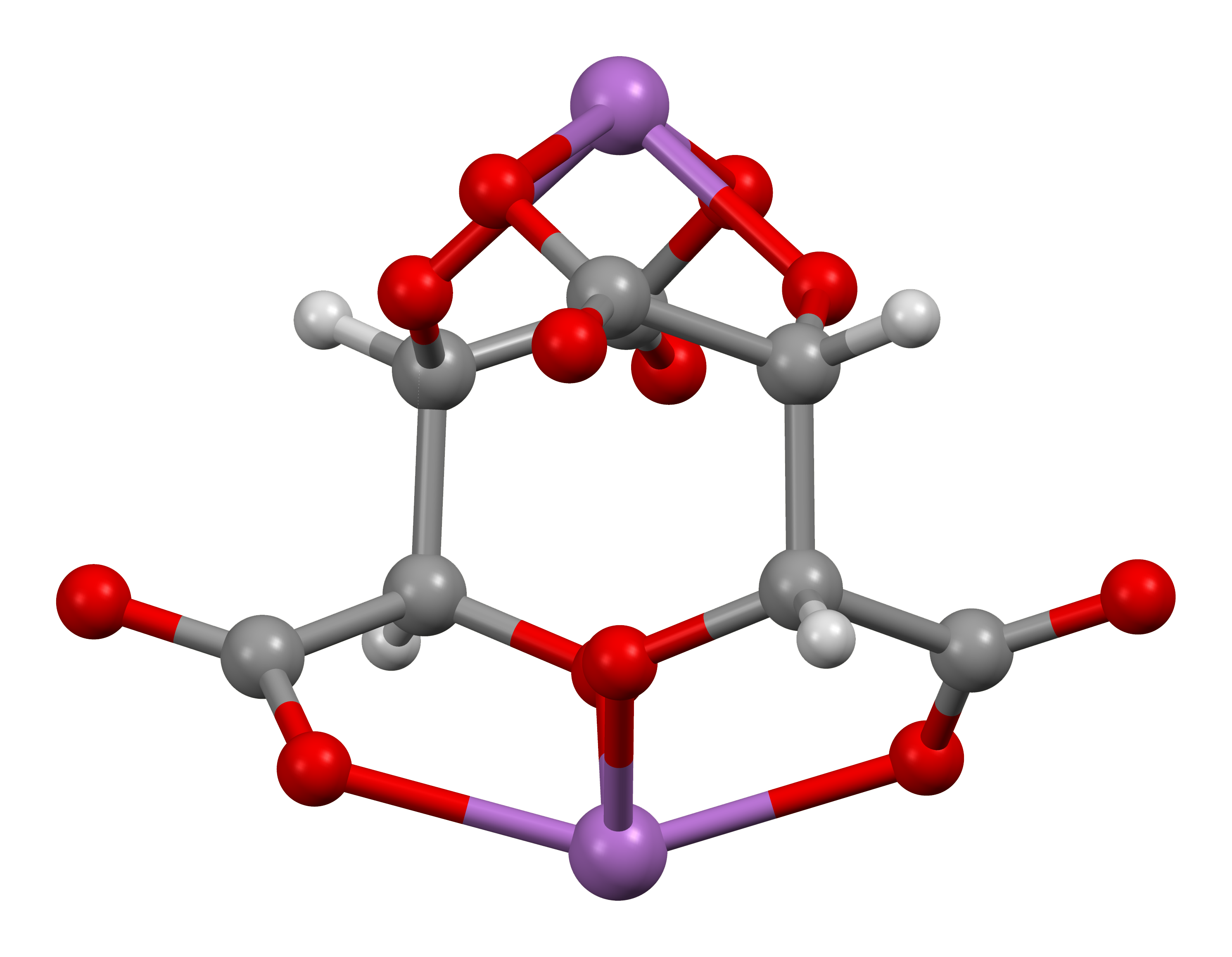
Viewed along the y axis

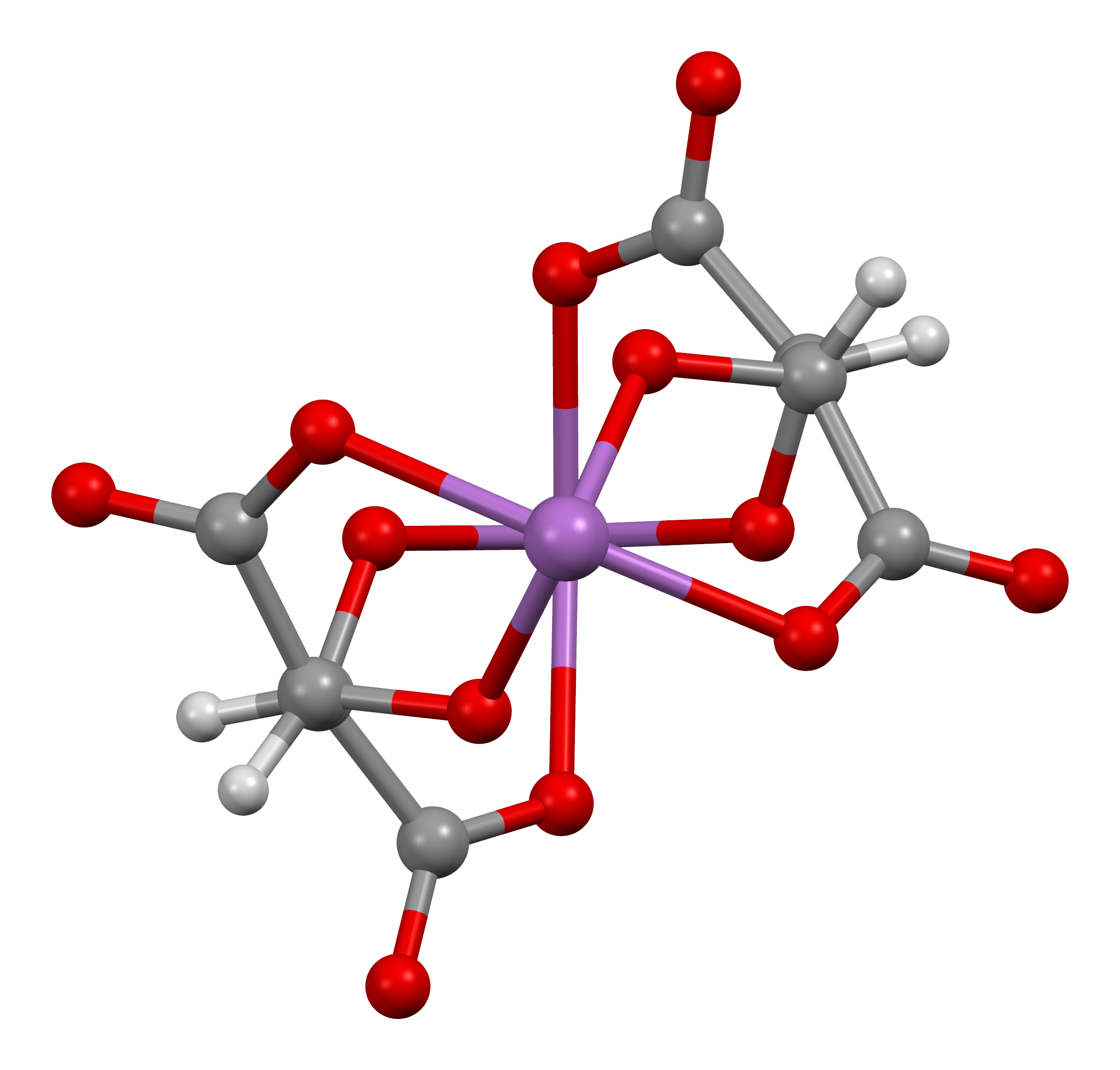
Viewed along the z axis
