= Antimony pill =

Nineteenth century remedy

An antimony pill is a pill made from metallic antimony. It was a popular remedy in the nineteenth century to purge and revitalise the bowels. In use, it is swallowed and allowed to pass through the body, after which it is customarily recovered for reuse, giving rise to the name everlasting pill. The antimonial cup yielded the same effect.

According to the Medico-Pharmaceutical Critic and Guide (1907), edited by William J. Robinson:

We have referred in the past to the economy which used to be practiced by our fore-fathers. Thus, for instance, it was customary to use leeches over and over again and there are instances of infection with syphilis by leeches that had been previously used on luetic patients. But we believe that the everlasting cathartic pill beats everything in the line of economy. This pill was a little bullet composed of metallic antimony which had or was believed to have the property of purging as often as it was swallowed. It is not inconceivable that it might have had such property, for it is possible that a minute amount was dissolved by the gastro-intestinal juices and this amount, plus the suggestion, was sufficient to produce cathartic action. Then again the everlasting pill probably aided peristalsis by its mechanical weight and motion. The bullet was passed out, recovered from the feces and used over and over again. This, as Dr. J. A. Paris says, was economy in right earnest, for a single pill would serve a whole family during their lives and might be transmitted as an heirloom to posterity.

== See also ==
- Antimonial
- Antimonial cup
- Pentavalent antimonial
