= Antimonial =

Remedies containing antimony

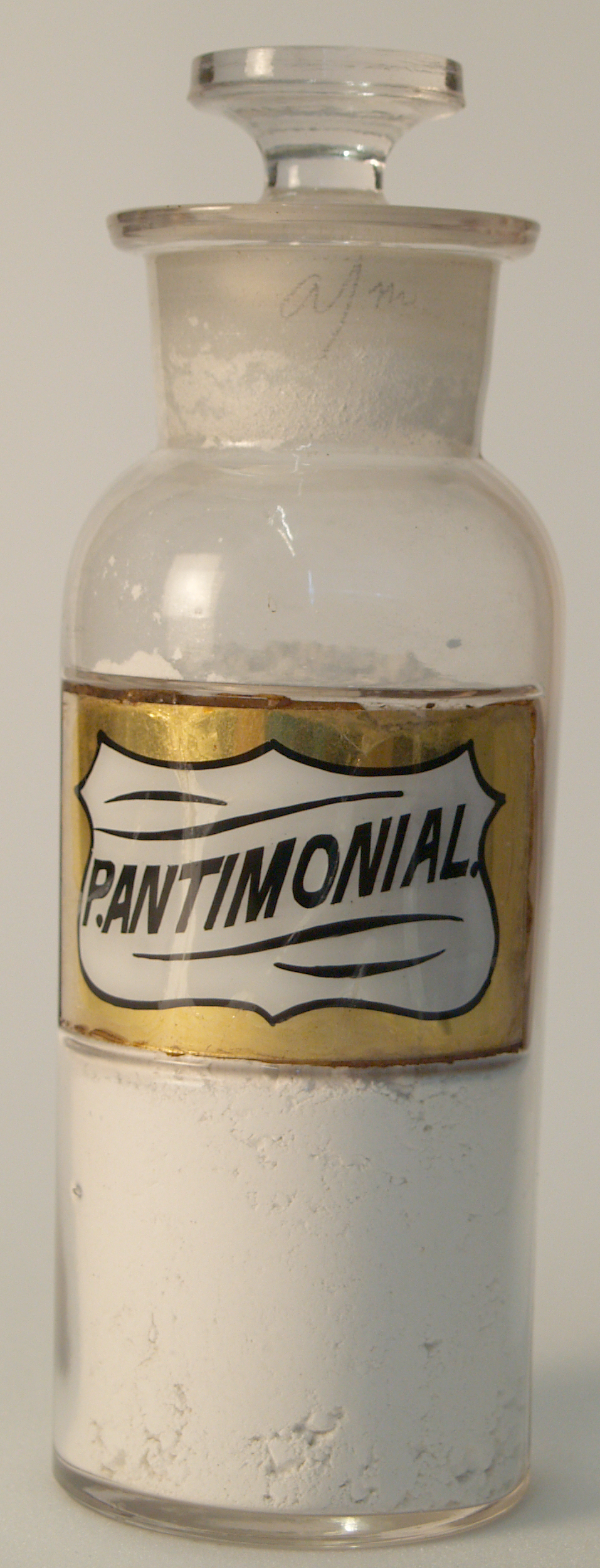
Bottle marked P. Antimonial from the Auckland Museum

Antimonials, in pre-modern medicine, were remedies principally containing antimony, used chiefly for emetic purposes. They might also have qualified for cathartic, diaphoretic, or simply alternative uses. Such treatments were considered unparalleled in their strength.

== Metaphorical usage ==
The following passage illustrates the use of the word antimonial to mean emetic in common (as well as medical) terms:

Bumble shook his head, as he replied, "Obstinate people, Mr. Sowerberry; very obstinate. Proud, too, I'm afraid, sir."
"Proud, eh?" exclaimed Mr. Sowerberry with a sneer. "Come, that's too much."
"Oh, it's sickening," replied the beadle. "Antimonial, Mr. Sowerberry!"

— Charles Dickens, Oliver Twist

== See also ==
- Antimony pill
- Antimonial cup
- Pentavalent antimonial

== See also ==
- Antimonial cup
- Pentavalent antimonial
