= Leonard Goodwin =

British protozoologist

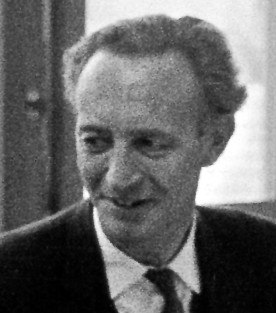
- Goodwin at a conference circa 1955
- Born: 11 July 1915
- Died: 25 November 2008 (aged 93)
- Education: University College London; College of the Pharmaceutical Society
- Known for: refinement of the chemotherapeutic index
- Awards: Manson Medal (1992)
- Scientific career
- Fields: protozoology
- Workplaces: Wellcome Bureau of Scientific Research; Wellcome Laboratories of Tropical Medicine; Nuffield Laboratories for Comparative Medicine

Leonard George Goodwin CMG FRS (11 July 1915 – 25 November 2008) was a British protozoologist noted for his work on testing the effectiveness of chemical compounds in treating tropical diseases. He was born in London to a shoe shop manager, and became interested in nature thanks to holidays spent with his grandfather, a gamekeeper, and his uncle, a pharmacist. He was educated at William Ellis School before being accepted into University College London to study botany and zoology. After graduating he went to the College of the Pharmaceutical Society and studied pharmacy, graduating in 1935. He became a demonstrator at the college under J H Burn and at his urging took further degrees in medicine and physiology.

The start of World War II saw the College evacuated, leaving Goodwin to find a new job. He started work at the Wellcome Bureau of Scientific Research but was called up for military service with the Royal Tank Regiment soon afterwards. After only a few days of training he was returned to Wellcome to work on tropical diseases, something considered 'vital war work' which excused him from military service. One of the important problems he was dealing with at the time was trying to find a way of preventing troops being infected with leishmaniasis, which was affecting large numbers of troops in Sicily at the time. The standard way of calculating the dosage of drug to give a person was the 'chemotherapeutic index', an index between the minimum dosage to cure an infection and the point at which the drug would kill the patient. Goodwin's attempt at refining the index by testing the drugs on European hamsters failed because they were already resistant to leishmaniasis; instead he got a scientist in Jerusalem to send him some Syrian hamsters to test the drugs on.

The research showed that Pentostam was the least toxic and most effective drug available to treat the disease, and it was issued to troops within a year. Goodwin later claimed that the Syrian hamsters used as pets in the United Kingdom were for the most part descended from the colony he had bred, and credited himself with introducing the use of hamsters as pets. He continued working at the Wellcome Bureau of Scientific Research until 1958, when he became director of the Wellcome Laboratories of Tropical Medicine. In 1964 he became head of the Nuffield Laboratories for Comparative Medicine, staying there until 1980. During this time he conducted research into anticoagulants, trypanosomiasis (sleeping sickness) and arteriosclerosis. In 1976 he was elected a Fellow of the Royal Society, and in the 1977 New Year Honours was appointed Companion of the Order of St Michael and St George (CMG) "for services to the study of tropical diseases".
