= United States v. 11 1/4 Dozen Packages of Articles Labeled in Part Mrs. Moffat's Shoo-Fly Powders for Drunkenness =

1941 US court case

- Court: United States District Court for the Western District of New York
- Full case name: United States v. 11 1/4 Dozen Packages of Articles Labeled in Part Mrs. Moffat's Shoo-Fly Powders for Drunkenness
- Decided: June 17, 1941
- Citation: 40 F. Supp. 208

Court membership
- Judge sitting: John Knight

Keywords
- in rem jurisdiction; patent medicine; alcohol intoxication

United States v. 11 1/4 Dozen Packages of Articles Labeled in Part Mrs. Moffat's Shoo-Fly Powders for Drunkenness, 40 F. Supp. 208, was a 1941 US federal court case heard in the United States District Court for the Western District of New York, alleging the misbranding of a putative cure for alcohol intoxication. The action's unusual name results, in part, from the customs of cases with in rem jurisdiction, and refers to 135 packages of the containers used to hold the powder. This case was one of the first actions taken by the United States Food and Drug Administration.

== Background ==
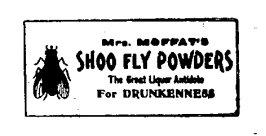
Label design of the product

Mrs. Moffat's Shoo-Fly Powders for Drunkenness, manufactured by M. F. Groves' Son & Co., was a product popular in the 19th century, alleged to be an effective antidote for drunkenness. The powder was tartar emetic, antimony potassium tartrate, which induces vomiting. By 1939, the product was considered a Mickey Finn, and criminal convictions had been obtained for some sellers for selling unlabelled poisons.

In 1938, the United States Congress passed the Federal Food, Drug, and Cosmetic Act (FFDCA), which gave authority to the Food and Drug Administration to regulate the manufacture and sale of food, pharmaceuticals and cosmetics involved in interstate commerce. Most of the provisions of that Act took effect in 1940.

== Legal case and opinion ==
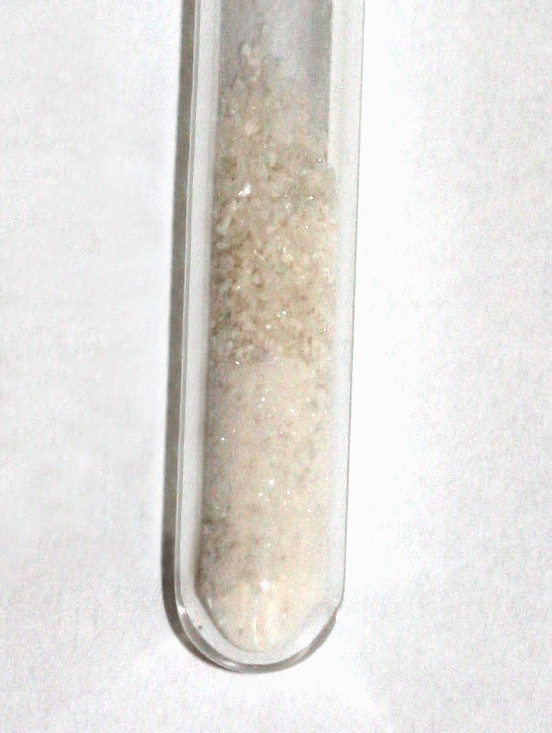
Mrs. Moffat's Shoo-Fly Powders contained tartar emetic, the substance shown here.

The FDA seized the packages following their shipment from the manufacturer in Philadelphia to Buffalo, New York, in November 1940. On November 27, the United States Attorney for the Western District of New York filed suit in district court under the FFDCA.

District Judge John Knight presided at trial. During the trial, the manufacturer was allowed to intervene in the case, and, during the trial, argued that the product had been sold for over 60 years, and despite annual sales of over 50,000 packages, no complaints had allegedly been received. The manufacturer's statements were stricken as hearsay.

A panel of five physicians testified to the toxicity and side-effects of tartar emetic, with the opinion summarizing their testimony in part:

tartar emetic taken through the mouth irritates the lining of the stomach and intestines, produces various injurious effects on various other organs of the body; that it is cumulative in its effect; that when taken in increased doses it causes nausea, vomiting, diarrhea and retching; and after absorption affects the liver and kidneys and increases the heart rate; that through the loss of the control of the muscles of the stomach the vomitus may be swallowed causing pneumonia.

The court ruled that the phrase "for Drunkenness" suggested that the powder was a cure or antidote for alcohol intoxication, with the judge concluding:

the articles in question are misbranded, since the labels thereon are false and misleading, because antimony and potassium tartrate in the dosage of 3.2 grains (Note: Approximately 207 mg) (the average in the articles analyzed) is not a "cure, mitigation or treatment" for drunkenness as purported to be and also that it is misbranded, because the use of the drug in the dosage of 3.2 grains is dangerous to health.

Another issue in the case was the question of whether the FFDCA, 21 U.S.C. § 352, required an intent to "deceive and defraud"; Knight's ruling set a lasting precedent that such intent was not required to win condemnation under the Act.

The "11 1/4 dozen packages" were condemned and later destroyed.

== Subsequent developments ==
The safety of the powders, argued in this case, has been further questioned, with at least one source wondering whether the rates of deaths attributed to liver failure and alcohol withdrawal during that era might have been due, instead, to the toxic effects of the product.

No antidote for inebriation was known to science until Ro15-4513 was developed (but not brought to market) in the 1980s.

The case name has been the target of humor, by sources such as Harper's Magazine in 2004 and the Virginia Law Review in both 1955 and 2000.
