= Antimony =

Antimony, _{51}Sb
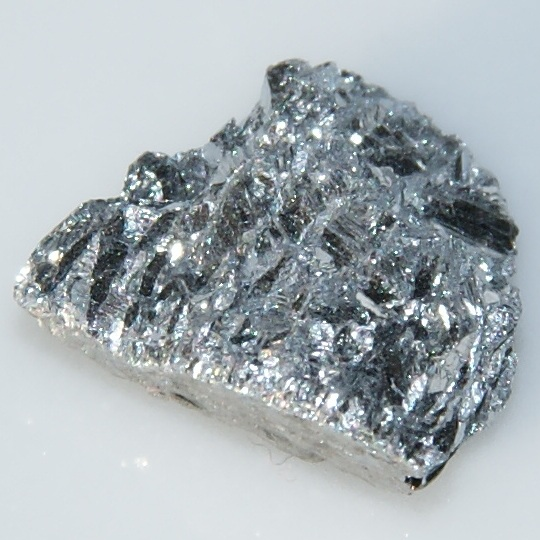

Antimony
- Pronunciation: UK: /ˈæntɪməni/ (AN-ti-mə-nee); US: /ˈæntəmoʊni/ (AN-tə-moh-nee)
- Alternative name: Stibium, pronounced: /ˈstɪbiəm/ (STIB-ee-əm)
- Appearance: silvery lustrous gray

Standard atomic weight A_{r}°(Sb)
- 121.760±0.001; 121.76±0.01 (abridged)

Antimony in the periodic table
Hydrogen																															Helium
Lithium	Beryllium																									Boron	Carbon	Nitrogen	Oxygen	Fluorine	Neon
Sodium	Magnesium																									Aluminium	Silicon	Phosphorus	Sulfur	Chlorine	Argon
Potassium	Calcium															Scandium	Titanium	Vanadium	Chromium	Manganese	Iron	Cobalt	Nickel	Copper	Zinc	Gallium	Germanium	Arsenic	Selenium	Bromine	Krypton
Rubidium	Strontium															Yttrium	Zirconium	Niobium	Molybdenum	Technetium	Ruthenium	Rhodium	Palladium	Silver	Cadmium	Indium	Tin	Antimony	Tellurium	Iodine	Xenon
Caesium	Barium	Lanthanum	Cerium	Praseodymium	Neodymium	Promethium	Samarium	Europium	Gadolinium	Terbium	Dysprosium	Holmium	Erbium	Thulium	Ytterbium	Lutetium	Hafnium	Tantalum	Tungsten	Rhenium	Osmium	Iridium	Platinum	Gold	Mercury (element)	Thallium	Lead	Bismuth	Polonium	Astatine	Radon
Francium	Radium	Actinium	Thorium	Protactinium	Uranium	Neptunium	Plutonium	Americium	Curium	Berkelium	Californium	Einsteinium	Fermium	Mendelevium	Nobelium	Lawrencium	Rutherfordium	Dubnium	Seaborgium	Bohrium	Hassium	Meitnerium	Darmstadtium	Roentgenium	Copernicium	Nihonium	Flerovium	Moscovium	Livermorium	Tennessine	Oganesson
As
↑
Sb
↓
Bi
tin ← antimony → tellurium
- Atomic number (Z): 51
- Group: group 15 (pnictogens)
- Period: period 5
- Block: p-block
- Electron configuration: [Kr] 4d^{10} 5s^{2} 5p^{3}
- Electrons per shell: 2, 8, 18, 18, 5

Physical properties
- Phase at STP: solid
- Melting point: 903.78 K (630.63 °C, 1167.13 °F)
- Boiling point: 1908 K (1635 °C, 2975 °F)
- Density (at 20° C): 6.694 g/cm^{3}
- when liquid (at m.p.): 6.53 g/cm^{3}
- Heat of fusion: 19.79 kJ/mol
- Heat of vaporization: 193.43 kJ/mol
- Molar heat capacity: 25.23 J/(mol·K)
- Specific heat capacity: 207.211 J/(kg·K)
Vapor pressure
P (Pa)	1	10	100	1 k	10 k	100 k
at T (K)	807	876	1011	1219	1491	1858

Atomic properties
- Oxidation states: common: −3, +3, +5 −2, −1, 0, +1, +2, +4
- Electronegativity: Pauling scale: 2.05
- Ionization energies: 1st: 834 kJ/mol; 2nd: 1594.9 kJ/mol; 3rd: 2440 kJ/mol; (more)
- Atomic radius: empirical: 140 pm
- Covalent radius: 139±5 pm
- Van der Waals radius: 206 pm
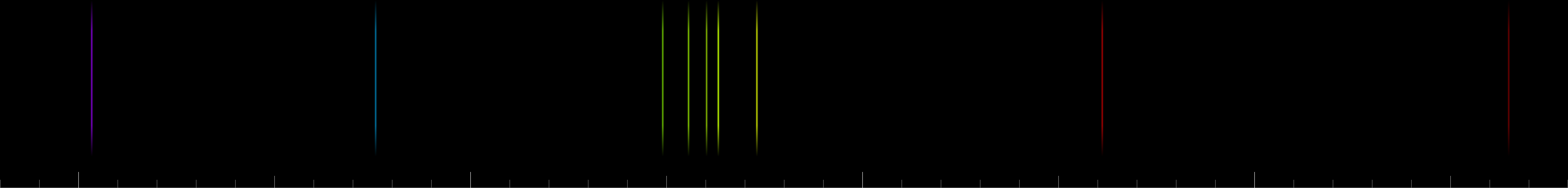
- Spectral lines of antimony

Other properties
- Natural occurrence: primordial
- Crystal structure: rhombohedral (hR2)
- Lattice constants: a = 0.45066 nm α = 57.112° a_{h} = 0.43084 nm c_{h} = 1.12736 nm (at 20 °C)
- Thermal expansion: 11.04×10^{−6}/K (at 20 °C) (Note: The thermal expansion is anisotropic: the parameters (at 20 °C) for each crystal axis are α_{ah} = 8.24×10^{−6}/K, α_{ch} = 16.62×10^{−6}/K, and α_{average} = α_{V}/3 = 11.04×10^{−6}/K.)
- Thermal conductivity: 24.4 W/(m⋅K)
- Electrical resistivity: 417 nΩ⋅m (at 20 °C)
- Magnetic ordering: diamagnetic
- Molar magnetic susceptibility: −99.0×10^{−6} cm^{3}/mol
- Young's modulus: 55 GPa
- Shear modulus: 20 GPa
- Bulk modulus: 42 GPa
- Speed of sound thin rod: 3420 m/s (at 20 °C)
- Mohs hardness: 3.0
- Brinell hardness: 294–384 MPa
- CAS Number: 7440-36-0

History
- Naming: Uncertain. Possibly from Greek anti ("not") + monos ("alone"), for not occurring alone in nature
- Discovery: Arabic alchemists (before AD 815)
- Symbol: "Sb": from Latin stibium 'stibnite'

Isotopes of antimony
Main isotopes			Decay	
Isotope	abundance	half-life (t_{1/2})	mode	product
^{121}Sb	57.21%	stable		
^{123}Sb	42.79%	stable		
^{125}Sb	synth	2.758 y	β^{−}	^{125}Te

Antimony is periodic table element number 51 with the symbol Sb (from Latin stibium). A lustrous grey metal or metalloid, it occurs in nature mainly in the form of the sulfide mineral stibnite (Sb_{2}S_{3}). Antimony has been known since antiquity and was powdered for use in cosmetics (often known by the Arabic name kohl) and as medicine.

Industrial methods for refining antimony from stibnite are roasting followed by reduction with carbon, or direct reduction of stibnite with iron.

The most common applications for metallic antimony are in alloys with lead and tin, which have improved properties for solders, bullets, and plain bearings. It improves the rigidity of lead-alloy plates in lead–acid batteries. Antimony trioxide is a prominent additive for halogen-containing flame retardants. Antimony is used as a dopant in semiconductor devices.

== Characteristics ==
=== Properties ===
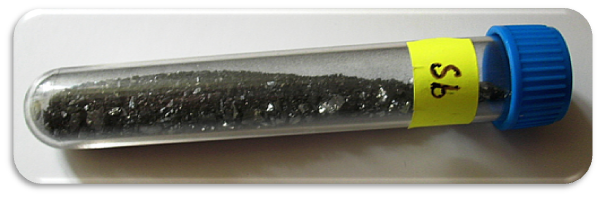
A vial containing the metallic allotrope of antimony

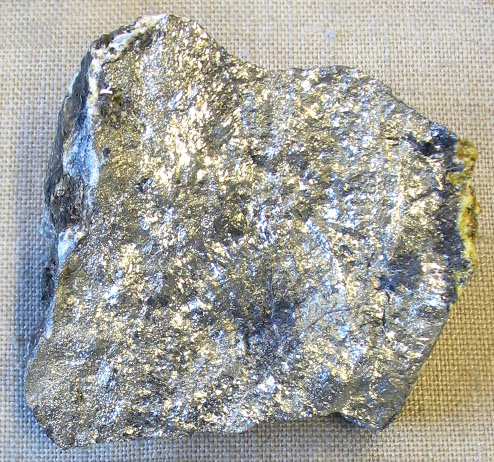
Native antimony with oxidation products

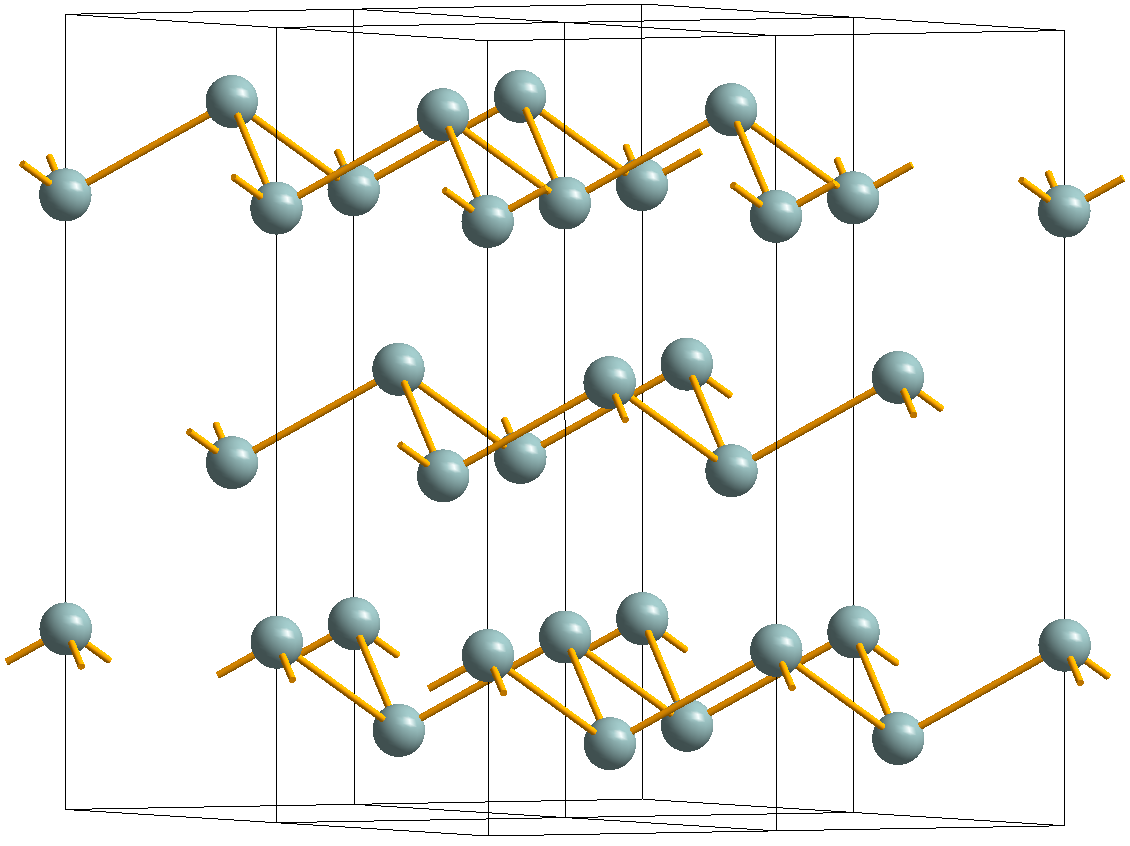
Crystal structure common to Sb, AsSb, and gray As

Antimony is a member of group 15 of the periodic table. As one of the elements called pnictogens, it has an electronegativity of 2.05. In accordance with periodic trends, it is more electronegative than tin or bismuth, and less electronegative than tellurium or arsenic. As a metalloid, it has a Mohs scale hardness of 3.

Antimony is a silvery, lustrous gray solid that is stable in air at room temperature. If heated, it reacts with oxygen to produce antimony trioxide,Sb_{2}O_{3}. Antimony is attacked by oxidizing acids.

The stable allotrope of antimony crystallises in a trigonal cell, isomorphic with bismuth and the gray allotrope of arsenic.

A yellow allotrope of antimony, assumed to be analogous to yellow arsenic, forms by oxidation of stibine (SbH_{3}) with air or oxygen at −90 °C. At ambient temperatures and in ambient light, it transforms into the more stable black allotrope. A rare explosive form of antimony can be formed from the electrolysis of antimony trichloride, but it always contains appreciable chlorine and is not really an antimony allotrope. When scratched with a sharp implement, an exothermic reaction occurs and white fumes are given off as metallic antimony forms; when rubbed with a pestle in a mortar, a strong detonation occurs.

Elemental antimony adopts a layered structure (space group R3̅m No. 166) whose layers consist of fused, ruffled, six-membered rings. The nearest and next-nearest neighbors form an irregular octahedral complex, with the three atoms in each double layer slightly closer than the three atoms in the next. This relatively close packing leads to a high density of 6.697 g/cm^{3}, but the weak bonding between the layers leads to the low hardness and brittleness of antimony.

=== Isotopes ===
Antimony has two stable isotopes: ^{121}Sb with a natural abundance of 57.21% and ^{123}Sb with a natural abundance of 42.79%. There are 37 artificial radioactive isotopes known with mass numbers 104 to 142, of which the longest-lived is the fission product ^{125}Sb with a half-life of 2.758 years. Numerous meta states are known, of which the most stable is ^{120m1}Sb with a half-life of 5.76 days. Isotopes that are lighter than the stable ^{123}Sb tend to undergo β^{+} decay, and those that are heavier experience β^{−} decay, with some exceptions.

=== Occurrence ===
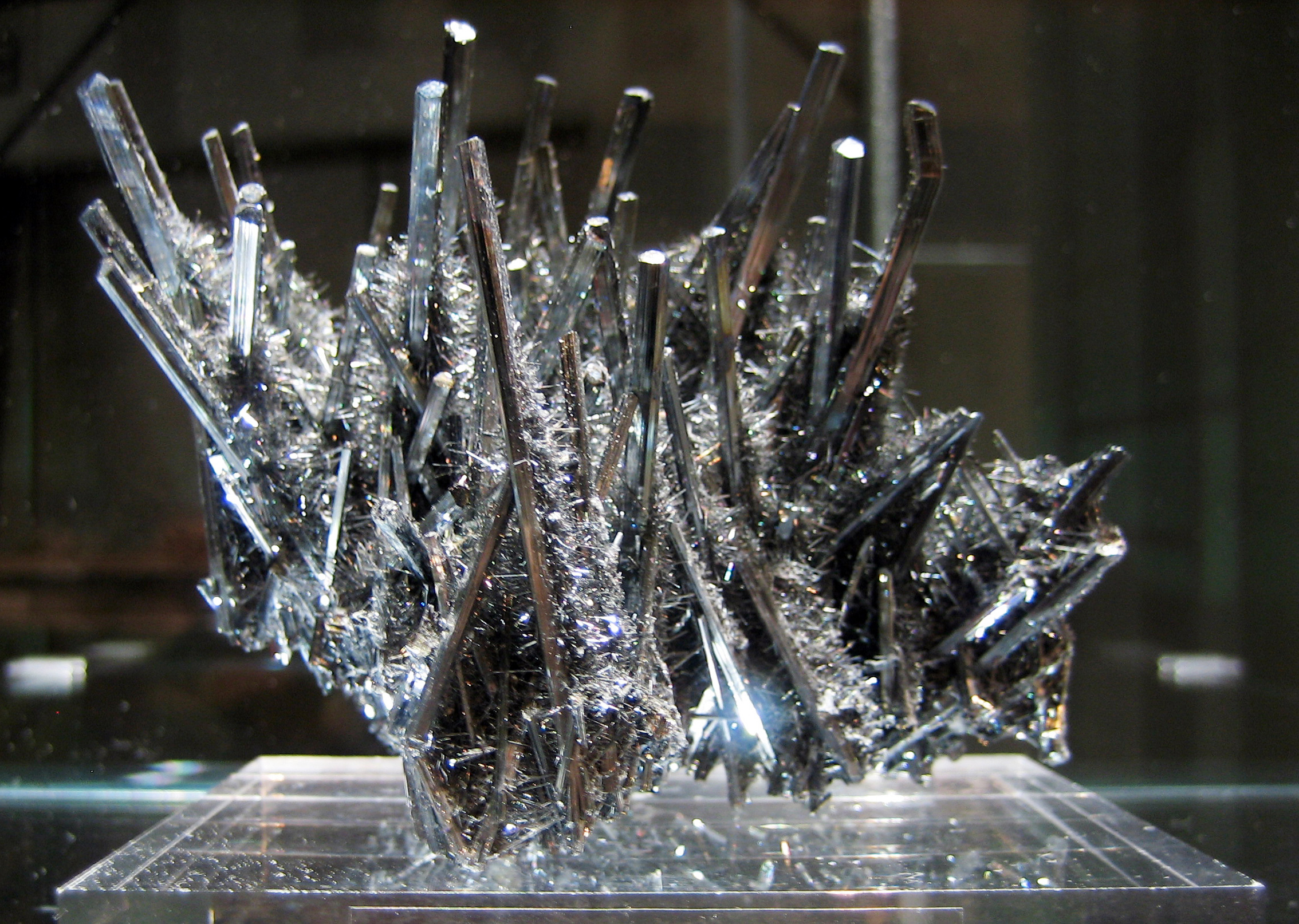
Stibnite, China CM29287 Carnegie Museum of Natural History specimen on display in Hillman Hall of Minerals and Gems

The abundance of antimony in the Earth's crust is estimated at 0.2 parts per million, comparable to thallium at 0.5 ppm and silver at 0.07 ppm. It is the 63rd most abundant element in the crust. Even though this element is not abundant, it is found in more than 100 mineral species. Antimony is sometimes found natively (e.g. on Antimony Peak), but more frequently it is found in the sulfide stibnite (Sb_{2}S_{3}) which is the predominant ore mineral.

== Compounds ==
Antimony compounds are often classified according to their oxidation state: Sb(III) and Sb(V). The +5 oxidation state is more common.

=== Oxides and hydroxides ===
Antimony trioxide is formed when antimony is burnt in air. In the gas phase, the molecule of the compound is Sb_{4}O_{6}, but it polymerizes upon condensing. Antimony pentoxide (Sb_{4}O_{10}) can be formed only by oxidation with concentrated nitric acid. Antimony also forms a mixed-valence oxide, antimony tetroxide (Sb_{2}O_{4}), which features both Sb(III) and Sb(V). Unlike oxides of phosphorus and arsenic, these oxides are amphoteric, do not form well-defined oxoacids, and react with acids to form antimony salts.

Antimonous acid Sb(OH)_{3} is unknown, but the conjugate base sodium antimonite ([Na_{3}SbO_{3}]_{4}) forms upon fusing sodium oxide and Sb_{4}O_{6}. Transition metal antimonites are also known. Antimonic acid exists only as the hydrate HSb(OH)_{6}, forming salts as the antimonate anion [Sb(OH)]_{6}^{−}. When a solution containing this anion is dehydrated, the precipitate contains mixed oxides.

The most important antimony ore is stibnite (Sb_{2}S_{3}). Other sulfide minerals include pyrargyrite (Ag_{3}SbS_{3}), zinkenite, jamesonite, and boulangerite. Antimony pentasulfide is non-stoichiometric, which features antimony in the +3 oxidation state and S–S bonds. Several thioantimonides are known, such as Sb_{6}S_{10}^{2−} and Sb_{8}S_{13}^{2−}.

=== Halides ===
Antimony forms two series of halides: SbX_{3} and SbX_{5}. Trihalides SbF_{3}, SbCl_{3}, SbBr_{3}, and SbI_{3} have trigonal pyramidal molecular geometry. Trifluoride is prepared by reaction of antimony trioxide with hydrofluoric acid:

Sb_{2}O_{3} + 6 HF → 2 SbF_{3} + 3 H_{2}O

It is Lewis acidic and readily accepts fluoride ions to form the complex anions SbF_{4}^{−} and SbF_{5}^{2−}. Molten antimony trifluoride is a weak electrical conductor. The trichloride is prepared by dissolving stibnite in hydrochloric acid:

Sb_{2}S_{3} + 6 HCl → 2 SbCl_{3} + 3 H_{2}S

Arsenic sulfides are not readily attacked by the hydrochloric acid, so this method offers a route to As-free Sb.

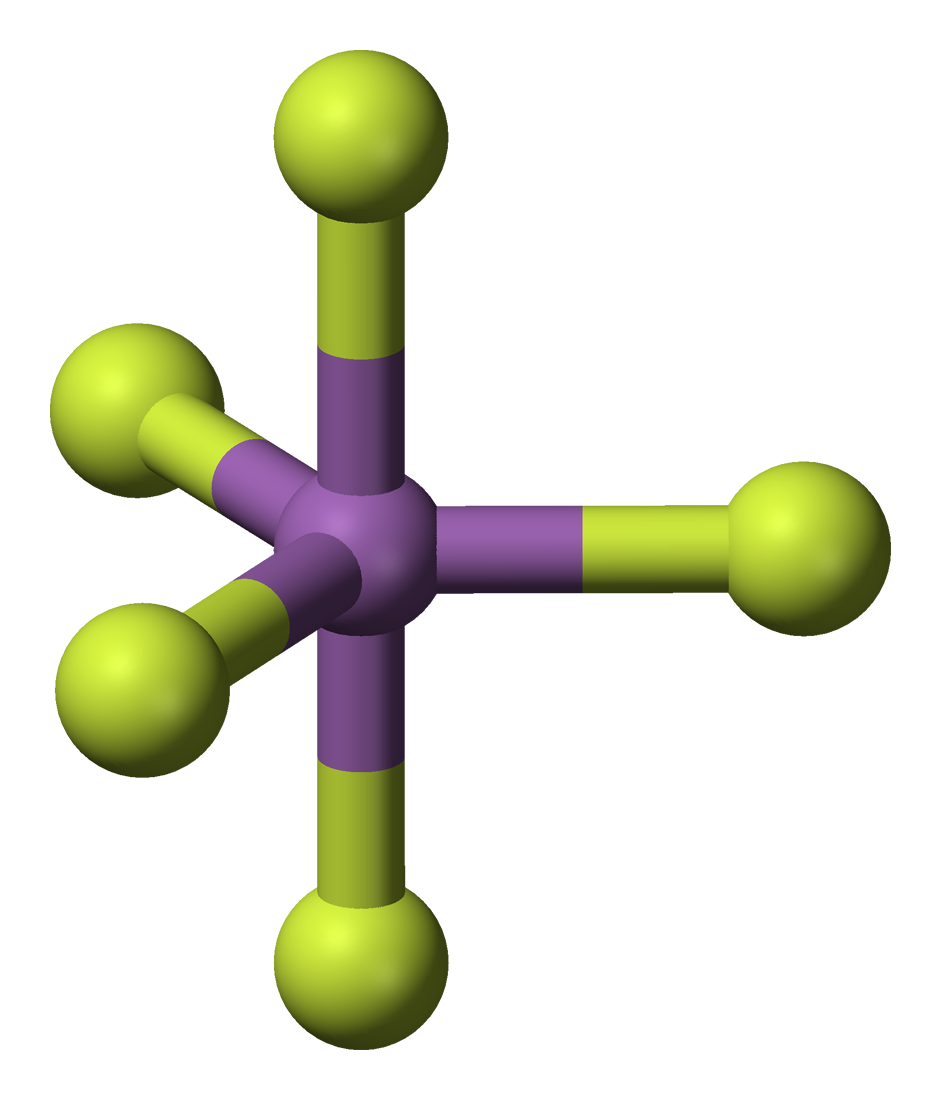
Structure of gaseous SbF_{5}

The pentahalides SbF_{5} and SbCl_{5} have trigonal bipyramidal molecular geometry in the gas phase, but in the liquid phase, SbF_{5} is polymeric, whereas SbCl_{5} is monomeric. Antimony pentafluoride is a powerful Lewis acid used to make the superacid fluoroantimonic acid (H_{2}F^{+}·SbF_{6}^{−}).

Oxohalides are more common for antimony than As & P. Antimony trioxide dissolves in concentrated acid to form oxoantimonyl compounds such as SbOCl and (SbO)_{2}SO_{4}.

=== Antimonides, hydrides, and organoantimony compounds ===
Compounds in this class generally are described as derivatives of Sb^{3−}. Antimony forms antimonides with metals, such as indium antimonide (InSb) and silver antimonide (Ag_{3}Sb). The alkali metal and zinc antimonides, such as Na_{3}Sb and Zn_{3}Sb_{2}, are more reactive. Treating these antimonides with acid produces the highly unstable gas stibine, SbH_{3}:

Sb^{3−} + 3 H^{+} → SbH_{3}

Stibine can also be produced by treating Sb^{3+} salts with hydride reagents such as sodium borohydride. Stibine decomposes spontaneously at room temperature. Because stibine has a positive heat of formation, it is thermodynamically unstable and thus antimony does not react with hydrogen directly.

Organoantimony compounds are typically prepared by alkylation of antimony halides with Grignard reagents. A large variety of compounds are known with both Sb(III) and Sb(V) centers, including mixed chloro-organic derivatives, anions, and cations. Examples include triphenylstibine (Sb(C_{6}H_{5})_{3}) and pentaphenylantimony (Sb(C_{6}H_{5})_{5}).

== History ==
One of the alchemical symbols for antimony

Antimony(III) sulfide, Sb_{2}S_{3}, was recognized in predynastic Egypt as an eye cosmetic (kohl) as early as about 3100 BC, when the cosmetic palette was invented.

An artifact, said to be part of a vase, made of antimony dating to about 3000 BC was found at Telloh, Chaldea (part of present-day Iraq), and a copper object plated with antimony dating between 2500 BC and 2200 BC has been found in Egypt. Austen, at a lecture by Herbert Gladstone in 1892, commented that "we only know of antimony at the present day as a highly brittle and crystalline metal, which could hardly be fashioned into a useful vase, and therefore this remarkable 'find' (artifact mentioned above) must represent the lost art of rendering antimony malleable."

The British archaeologist Roger Moorey was unconvinced the artifact was indeed a vase, mentioning that Selimkhanov, after his analysis of the Tello object (published in 1975), "attempted to relate the metal to Transcaucasian natural antimony" (i.e. native metal) and that "the antimony objects from Transcaucasia are all small personal ornaments." This weakens the evidence for a lost art "of rendering antimony malleable".

The Roman scholar Pliny the Elder described several ways of preparing antimony sulfide for medical purposes in his treatise Natural History, around 77 AD. Pliny the Elder also made a distinction between "male" and "female" forms of antimony; the male form is probably the sulfide, while the female form, which is superior, heavier, and less friable, has been suspected to be native metallic antimony.

The Greek naturalist Pedanius Dioscorides mentioned that antimony sulfide could be roasted by heating by a current of air. It is thought that this produced metallic antimony.

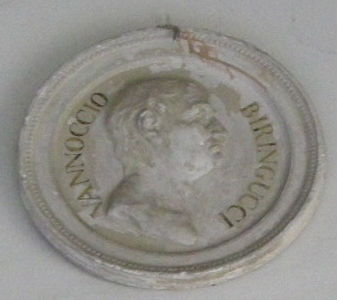
The Italian metallurgist Vannoccio Biringuccio described a procedure to isolate antimony in 1540.

Antimony was frequently described in alchemical manuscripts, including the Summa Perfectionis of Pseudo-Geber, written around the 14th century. A description of a procedure for isolating antimony is later given in the 1540 book De la pirotechnia by Vannoccio Biringuccio, predating the more famous 1556 book by Agricola, De re metallica. In this context Agricola has been often incorrectly credited with the discovery of metallic antimony. The book Currus Triumphalis Antimonii (The Triumphal Chariot of Antimony), describing the preparation of metallic antimony, was published in Germany in 1604. It was purported to be written by a Benedictine monk, writing under the name Basilius Valentinus in the 15th century; if it were authentic, which it is not, it would predate Biringuccio. (Note: Already in 1710 Wilhelm Gottlob Freiherr von Leibniz, after careful inquiry, concluded the work was spurious, there was no monk named Basilius Valentinus, and the book's author was its ostensible editor, Johann Thölde (c. 1565 – c. 1624). Professional historians now agree the Currus Triumphalis ... was written after the middle of the 16th century and Thölde was likely its author. Harold Jantz was perhaps the only modern scholar to deny Thölde's authorship, but he too agrees the work dates from after 1550.)

The metal antimony was known to German chemist Andreas Libavius in 1615 who obtained it by adding iron to a molten mixture of antimony sulfide, salt, and potassium tartrate. This procedure produced antimony with a crystalline or starred surface.

With the advent of challenges to phlogiston theory, it was recognized that antimony is an element forming sulfides, oxides, and other compounds, as do other metals.

The first discovery of naturally occurring pure antimony in the Earth's crust was described by the Swedish scientist and local mine district engineer Anton von Swab in 1783; the type-sample was collected from the Sala Silver Mine in the Bergslagen mining district of Sala, Västmanland, Sweden.

Coins of antimony were issued in China's Guizhou in 1931; durability was poor, and minting was soon discontinued because of its softness and toxicity.

=== Etymology ===
The medieval Latin form, from which the modern languages and late Byzantine Greek take their names for antimony, is antimonium. The origin of that is uncertain, and all suggestions have some difficulty either of form or interpretation. The popular etymology, from ἀντίμοναχός anti-monachos or French antimoine, would mean "monk-killer", which is explained by the fact that many early alchemists were monks, and some antimony compounds they used were poisonous.

Another popular etymology is the hypothetical Greek word ἀντίμόνος antimonos, "against aloneness", explained as "not found as metal", or "not found unalloyed". However, ancient Greek would more naturally express the pure negative as α- ("not"). Edmund Oscar von Lippmann conjectured a hypothetical Greek word ανθήμόνιον anthemonion, which would mean "floret", and cites several examples of related Greek words which describe chemical or biological efflorescence.

The early uses of antimonium include the translations, in 1050–1100, by Constantine the African of Arabic medical treatises. Several authorities believe antimonium is a scribal corruption of some Arabic form; Meyerhof derives it from ithmid; other possibilities include athimar, the Arabic name of the metalloid, and a hypothetical as-stimmi, derived from or parallel to the Greek.

The standard chemical symbol for antimony (Sb) is credited to Jöns Jakob Berzelius, who derived the abbreviation from stibium.

The ancient words for antimony mostly have, as their chief meaning, kohl, the sulfide of antimony.

The Egyptians called antimony mśdmt or stm.

The Arabic word for the substance, as opposed to the cosmetic, can appear as إثمد ithmid, athmoud, othmod, or uthmod. Littré suggests the first form, which is the earliest, derives from stimmida, an accusative for stimmi. The Greek word στίμμι (stimmi) is used by Attic tragic poets of the 5th century BC, and is possibly a loan word from Arabic or from Egyptian stm.

== Production ==
Antimony production

=== Process ===
Extraction of antimony depends on quality & composition of ore. Most antimony is mined as the sulfide; lower-grade ores are concentrated by froth flotation, while higher-grade ores are heated to 500–600 °C, the temperature at which stibnite melts and separates from the gangue minerals. Antimony can be isolated from the crude antimony sulfide by reduction with scrap iron:

Sb_{2}S_{3} + 3 Fe → 2 Sb + 3 FeS

The sulfide is converted to an oxide by roasting. The product is further purified by vaporizing the volatile antimony(III) oxide, which is recovered. This sublimate is often used directly for the main applications, impurities being arsenic and sulfide. Antimony is isolated from the oxide by a carbothermal reduction:

2 Sb_{2}O_{3} + 3 C → 4 Sb + 3 CO_{2}

The lower-grade ores are reduced in blast furnaces while the higher-grade ores are reduced in reverberatory furnaces.

World production trend of antimony

=== Top producers and production volumes ===
In 2022, according to the US Geological Survey, China accounted for 54.5% of total antimony production, followed in second place by Russia with 18.2% and Tajikistan with 15.5%.

Antimony mining in 2022
Country	Tonnes	% of total
China	60,000	54.5
Russia	20,000	18.2
Tajikistan	17,000	15.5
Myanmar	4,000	3.6
Australia	4,000	3.6
Top 5	105,000	95.5
Total world	110,000	100.0

Chinese production of antimony is expected to decline in the future as mines and smelters are closed down by the government as part of pollution control and stricter environmental rules. Especially due to an environmental protection law having gone into effect in January 2015 and revised "Emission standards of pollutants for stannum (Note: Tin), antimony and mercury industries" having gone into effect, hurdles for economic production are higher.

Reported production of antimony in China has fallen and is unlikely to increase in the coming years, according to the Roskill report. No significant antimony deposits in China have been developed for about ten years, and the remaining economic reserves are being rapidly depleted. Myanmar is also facing supply disruptions due to political unrest.

=== Reserves ===
World antimony reserves in 2022
Country	Reserves (tonnes)
China	670,000
Russia	350,000
Bolivia	310,000
Kyrgyzstan	260,000
Myanmar	140,000
Australia	120,000
Turkey	100,000
Canada	78,000
United States	60,000
Slovakia	60,000
Tajikistan	50,000
Total world	>2,470,000

=== Supply risk ===
For antimony-importing regions, such as Europe and the U.S., antimony is considered to be a critical mineral for industrial manufacturing that is at risk of supply chain disruption. With global production (in 2019) coming mainly from China (74%), Tajikistan (8%), and Russia (4%), these sources are critical to supply.

European Union
Antimony is considered a critical raw material for defense, automotive, construction, and textiles. In 2019, the E.U. sources were 100% imported, coming mainly from Turkey (62%), Bolivia (20%), and Guatemala (7%).
United Kingdom
The British Geological Survey's 2015 risk list ranked antimony second highest (after rare-earth elements) on the relative supply risk index.
United States
Antimony is a mineral commodity considered critical to the economic and national security. In 2021, no antimony was mined in the U.S.

In December 2024, the PR China has banned export of critical minerals.

== Applications ==
In 2017, approximately 48% of antimony was consumed in flame retardants, 33% in lead–acid batteries, and 8% in plastics.

=== Flame retardants ===
Antimony is mainly used as the trioxide for flame-proofing compounds, always in combination with halogenated flame retardants except in halogen-containing polymers. The flame retarding effect of antimony trioxide is produced by the formation of halogenated antimony compounds, which react with hydrogen atoms, and probably also with oxygen atoms and OH radicals, thus inhibiting fire. Markets for these flame-retardants include children's clothing, toys, aircraft, and automobile seat covers. They are also added to polyester resins in fiberglass composites for such items as light aircraft engine covers. The resin will burn in the presence of an externally generated flame, but will extinguish when the external flame is removed. Antimony trioxide is also used as a synergist with brominated flame retardants in housings and plastic parts for electrical and electronic equipment (e.g., HIPS/ABS enclosures) to meet flammability standards such as UL 94.

=== Alloys ===
Antimony forms a highly useful alloy with lead, increasing its hardness and mechanical strength. When casting it increases fluidity of the melt and reduces shrinkage during cooling. For most applications involving lead, varying amounts of antimony are used as alloying metal. In lead–acid batteries, this addition improves plate strength and charging characteristics. For sailboats, lead keels are used to provide righting moment, ranging from 600 lbs to over 200 tons for the largest sailing superyachts; to improve hardness and tensile strength of the lead keel, antimony is mixed with lead between 2% and 5% by volume. Antimony is used in antifriction alloys (such as Babbitt metal), in bullets and lead shot, electrical cable sheathing, type metal (for example, for Linotype machines), solder (some "lead-free" solders contain 5% Sb), in pewter, and in hardening alloys with low tin content in the manufacturing of organ pipes.

=== Other applications ===
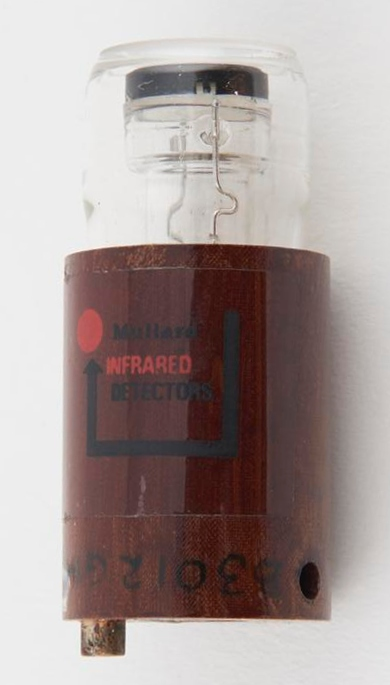
InSb infrared detector manufactured by Mullard in the 1960s

Three other applications consume nearly all the rest of the world's supply. One application is as a stabilizer and catalyst for the production of polyethylene terephthalate. Another is as a fining agent to remove microscopic bubbles in glass, mostly for TV screens; antimony ions interact with oxygen, suppressing the tendency of the latter to form bubbles. This also prevents discolouration. The third application is pigments. Antimony also helps to maintain color stability and surface smoothness when it is used with certain types of ceramics and enamels.

In the 1990s antimony was increasingly being used in semiconductors as a dopant in n-type silicon wafers for diodes, infrared detectors, and Hall-effect devices. In the 1950s, the emitters and collectors of n–p–n alloy-junction transistors were doped with tiny beads of a lead-antimony alloy. Indium antimonide (InSb) is used as a material for mid-infrared detectors.

The material Ge_{2}Sb_{2}Te_{5} is used for phase-change memory, a type of computer memory.

Biology and medicine have few uses for antimony. Treatments containing antimony, known as antimonials, are used as emetics. Antimony compounds are used as antiprotozoan drugs. Potassium antimonyl tartrate, or tartar emetic, was once used as an anti-schistosomal drug from 1919 on. It was subsequently replaced by praziquantel. Antimony and its compounds are used in several veterinary preparations, such as anthiomaline and lithium antimony thiomalate, as a skin conditioner for ruminants. Antimony has a nourishing or conditioning effect on keratinized tissues in animals.

Antimony-based drugs, such as meglumine antimoniate, are also considered the drugs of choice for treatment of leishmaniasis. Early treatments used antimony(III) species (trivalent antimonials), but in 1922 Upendranath Brahmachari invented a much safer antimony(V) drug and, since then, so-called pentavalent antimonials have been the standard first-line treatment. However, Leishmania strains in Bihar and neighboring regions have developed resistance to antimony. Elemental antimony in the form of an antimony pill was once used as a medicine. It could be reused by others after ingestion and elimination.

Antimony(III) sulfide is used in the heads of some safety matches. Antimony sulfides help to stabilize the friction coefficient in automotive brake pad materials. Antimony is used in bullets, bullet tracers, paint, glass art, and as an opacifier in enamel.

The powder derived from crushed antimony sulfide (kohl) has been used for millennia as an eye cosmetic. Historically it was applied to the eyes with a metal rod and with one's spittle, and was thought by the ancients to aid in curing eye infections. The practice is still seen in Yemen and in other Muslim countries.

Antimony-124 is used together with beryllium in neutron sources; the gamma rays emitted by antimony-124 initiate the photodisintegration of beryllium. The emitted neutrons have an average energy of 24 keV. Natural antimony is used in startup neutron sources.

== Precautions ==
Antimony
Hazards
- GHS labelling
Pictograms	(GHS06: Toxic) (GHS07: Exclamation mark) (GHS08: Health hazard) (GHS09: Environmental hazard)
Signal word	Danger
Hazard statements	H301, H332, H351, H373, H411
Precautionary statements	P203, P260, P264, P270, P273, P280, P301+P316, P304+P340, P318, P321, P330, P391, P405
NFPA 704 (fire diamond)	2 1 0

Antimony and many of its compounds are toxic, and the effects of antimony poisoning are similar to arsenic poisoning. The toxicity of antimony is far lower than that of arsenic; this might be caused by the significant differences of uptake, metabolism, and excretion between arsenic and antimony. The uptake of antimony(III) or antimony(V) in the gastrointestinal tract is at most 20%. Antimony(V) is not quantitatively reduced to antimony(III) in the cell (in fact antimony(III) is oxidised to antimony(V) instead).

Since biomethylation of antimony does not occur, the excretion of antimony(V) in urine is the main way of elimination. Like arsenic, the most serious effect of acute antimony poisoning is cardiotoxicity and the resulting myocarditis; however, it can also manifest as Adams–Stokes syndrome, which arsenic does not. Reported cases of intoxication by antimony equivalent to 90 mg antimony potassium tartrate dissolved from enamel has been reported to show only short-term effects. An intoxication with 6 g of antimony potassium tartrate was reported to result in death after three days.

Inhalation of antimony dust is harmful and in certain cases may be fatal; in small doses, antimony causes headaches, dizziness, and depression. Larger doses such as prolonged skin contact may cause dermatitis, or damage the kidneys and the liver, causing violent and frequent vomiting, leading to death in a few days.

Antimony is incompatible with strong oxidizing agents, strong acids, halogen acids, chlorine, or fluorine. It should be kept away from heat.

Antimony leaches from polyethylene terephthalate (PET) bottles into liquids. While levels observed for bottled water are below drinking water guidelines, fruit juice concentrates (for which no guidelines are established) produced in the UK were found to contain up to 44.7 μg/L of antimony, well above the EU limits for tap water of 5 μg/L. The guidelines are:

- World Health Organization: 20 μg/L
- Japan: 15 μg/L
- United States Environmental Protection Agency, Health Canada, and the Ontario Ministry of Environment: 6 μg/L
- EU and German Federal Ministry of Environment: 5 μg/L

The tolerable daily intake (TDI) proposed by WHO is 6 μg antimony per kilogram of body weight. The immediately dangerous to life or health (IDLH) value for antimony is 50 mg/m^{3} (50 μg/L).

=== Toxicity ===
Certain compounds of antimony appear to be toxic, particularly antimony trioxide and antimony potassium tartrate. Effects may be similar to arsenic poisoning. Occupational exposure may cause respiratory irritation, pneumoconiosis, antimony spots on the skin, gastrointestinal symptoms, and cardiac arrhythmias. Antimony trioxide is potentially carcinogenic to humans.

Adverse health effects have been observed in humans and animals following inhalation, oral, or dermal exposure to antimony and antimony compounds. Antimony toxicity typically occurs either due to occupational exposure, during therapy, or from accidental ingestion. It is unclear if antimony can enter the body through the skin. The presence of low levels of antimony in saliva may also be associated with dental decay.

== Cited sources ==
- Greenwood, N. N.; Earnshaw, A. (1997). Chemistry of the Elements (2nd ed.). Oxford: Butterworth-Heinemann. ISBN 0-7506-3365-4.
- Wiberg, Egon; Wiberg, Nils & Holleman, Arnold Frederick (2001). Inorganic chemistry. Academic Press. ISBN 978-0-12-352651-9.
