= Sodium stibogluconate =

Pharmaceutical drug

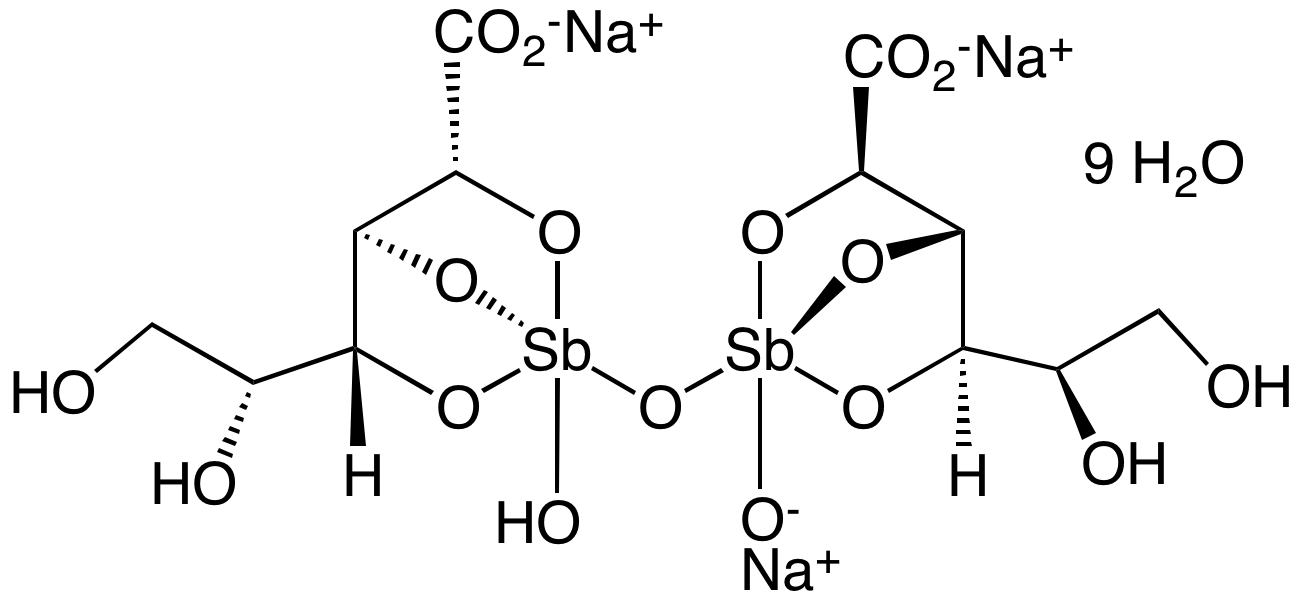

Clinical data
- Trade names: Pentostam, Stiboson, others
- AHFS/Drugs.com: International Drug Names
- Routes of administration: intravenous, intramusclar
- ATC code: P01CB02 (WHO) QP51AB02 (WHO)

Legal status
- Legal status: In general: ℞ (Prescription only)

Identifiers
- IUPAC name: 2,4:2',4'-O-(oxydistibylidyne)bis[D-gluconic acid]
- CAS Number: 219717-42-7; nonhydrate: 16037-91-5
- PubChem CID: 16685683
- DrugBank: DB05630
- ChemSpider: 21106382
- UNII: V083S0159D; nonhydrate: APJ6285Y89
- KEGG: D00582
- ChEMBL: ChEMBL367144
- NIAID ChemDB: 007935
- CompTox Dashboard (EPA): DTXSID50894911
- ECHA InfoCard: 100.170.909

Chemical and physical data
- Formula: C_{12}H_{38}Na_{3}O_{26}Sb_{2}
- Molar mass: 910.899 g·mol^{−1}
- 3D model (JSmol): Interactive image
- SMILES: [Na+].[Na+].[Na+].O=[Sb]2(O[Sb]1(=O)OC([C@H](O)CO)[C@H](O)[C@@H](O1)C([O-])=O)O[C@@H]([C@H](O)[C@@H](O2)C([O-])=O)[C@H](O)CO
- InChI: InChI=1S/2C6H10O7.3Na.3O.2Sb/c2*7-1-2(8)3(9)4(10)5(11)6(12)13;;;;;;;;/h2*2-5,7-8,10H,1H2,(H,12,13);;;;;;;;/q2*-2;3*+1;;;;2*+2/p-2/t2-,3?,4+,5-;2-,3-,4+,5-;;;;;;;;/m11......../s1; Key:RTLKTTNTVTVWPV-UQCYVGCHSA-L

Sodium stibogluconate, sold under the brand name Pentostam among others, is a medication used to treat leishmaniasis. This includes leishmaniasis of the cutaneous, visceral, and mucosal types. Some combination of miltefosine, paromomycin and liposomal amphotericin B, however, may be recommended due to issues with resistance. It is given by injection.

Side effects are common and include loss of appetite, nausea, muscle pains, headache, and feeling tired. Serious side effect may include an irregular heartbeat or pancreatitis. Sodium stibogluconate is less safe than some other options during pregnancy. It is not believed to result in any problems if used during breastfeeding. Sodium stibogluconate is in the pentavalent antimonials class of medication.

Sodium stibogluconate has been studied as early as 1937 and has been in medical use since the 1940s. It is on the World Health Organization's List of Essential Medicines.

== Side effects ==
Sodium stibogluconate is exceedingly toxic to veins. One of the practical problems is that after a few doses it can become exceedingly difficult to find a vein in which to inject the drug. The insertion of a peripherally inserted central catheter (PICC) does not prevent the problem and can instead exacerbate it: the entire vein along the course of the PICC line can become inflamed and thrombose. Large doses of sodium stibogluconate are often administered as dilute solutions.

Pancreatitis is a common deleterious effect of the drug, and the serum amylase or lipase should be monitored twice weekly; there is no need to stop treatment if the amylase remains less than four times the upper limit of normal; if the amylase rises above the cut-off, then treatment should be interrupted until the amylase falls to less than twice the upper limit of normal, whereupon treatment can be resumed. Cardiac conduction disturbances are less common, but electrocardiograph (ECG) monitoring while the medicine is injected is advisable and changes quickly reverse after the drug is stopped or the infusion rate is decreased.

The drug can be given intramuscularly but is exceedingly painful when given by this route. It can also be given intralesionally when treating cutaneous leishmaniasis (i.e., injected directly into the area of infected skin) and again, this is exceedingly painful and does not give results superior to intravenous administration.

Sodium stibogluconate can also cause a reduced appetite, metallic taste in mouth, nausea, vomiting, diarrhoea, headache, tiredness, joint pains, muscle aches, dizziness, and anaphylaxis.

== Dosing ==
As dosage regimens for treating leishmaniasis have evolved, the daily dose of antimony and the duration of therapy have been progressively increased to combat unresponsiveness to therapy. In the 1980s, the use of 20 mg/kg/day (instead of 10 mg/kg/day) of antimony was recommended, but only to a maximum daily dose of 850 mg. Recent research has suggested on the basis of recent efficacy and toxicity data that this 850-mg restriction should be removed. The evidence to date, which is in their research, suggests that a regimen of 20 mg/kg/day of pentavalent antimony, without an upper limit on the daily dose, is more efficacious and is not substantially more toxic than regimens with lower daily doses. It is recommend treating all forms of leishmaniasis with a full 20 mg/kg/day of pentavalent antimony. Treatment of cutaneous leishmaniasis usually lasts for 20 days and visceral and mucosal leishmaniasis for 28 days.

The dose of sodium stibogluconate is by slow intravenous infusion (at least five minutes with cardiac monitoring). The injection are stopped if there is coughing or central chest pain. The chemotherapeutic index was established by Leonard Goodwin during the Second World War when a treatment was urgently required for Allied troops during the invasion of Sicily.

The duration of treatment is usually 10 to 21 days and depends on the species of Leishmania and the type of infection (cutaneous or visceral).

== Chemical structure ==
The chemical structure of sodium stibogluconate is somewhat ambiguous, and the structure shown above is idealized. Its solutions may contain multiple antimony compounds, although this heterogeneity may be unimportant. It has been speculated that the active species contains only a single antimony centre.

== Pharmacokinetics ==
Pentavalent antimony does not appear to accumulate in the body and is excreted by the kidneys.

== Mechanism of action ==
The mechanism of sodium stibogluconate is poorly understood, but is thought to stem from the inhibition of macromolecular synthesis via a reduction in available ATP and GTP, likely secondary to inhibition of the citric acid cycle and glycolysis. Bermann et al. studied the effects of stibogluconate on Leishmania mexicana and demonstrated a 56–65% reduction in incorporation of a label into purine nucleoside triphosphates (ATP and GTP) as well as between a 34–60% increase of label incorporation into purine nucleoside mono- and diphosphates (AMP, GMP, ADP, and GDP) following 4 hour exposure to stibogluconate.
