= Miltefosine =

Phospholipid antimicrobial drug

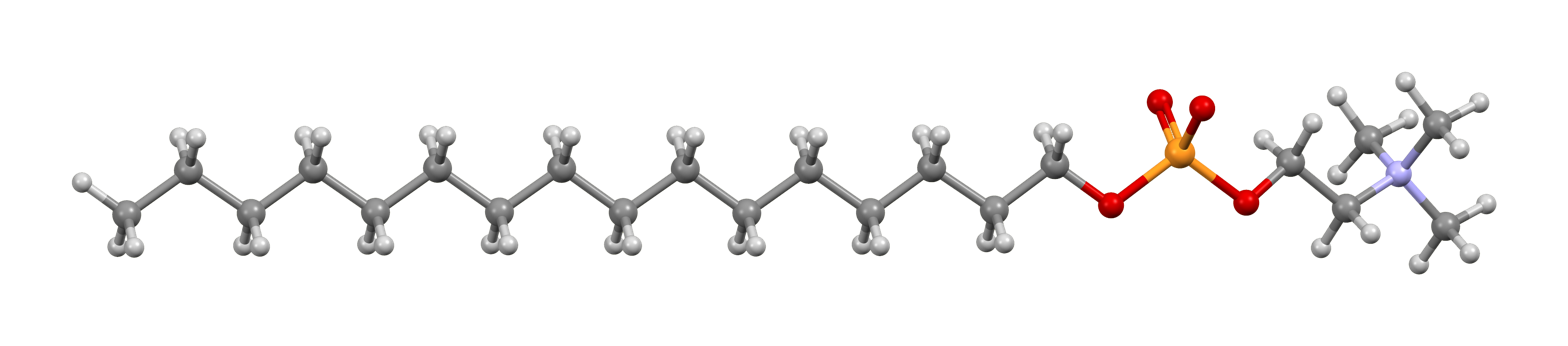

Clinical data
- Trade names: Impavido, Miltex, others
- AHFS/Drugs.com: Monograph
- License data: US DailyMed: Miltefosine
- Routes of administration: By mouth
- ATC code: P01CX04 (WHO) QP51DX07 (WHO)

Legal status
- Legal status: BR: Class C1 (Other controlled substances); US: ℞-only; In general: ℞ (Prescription only)

Pharmacokinetic data
- Bioavailability: High
- Protein binding: ~98%
- Metabolism: Slow hepatic (non-CYP-dependent)
- Elimination half-life: 6 to 8 days and 31 days
- Excretion: Primarily fecal

Identifiers
- IUPAC name: 2-(hexadecoxy-oxido-phosphoryl)oxyethyl-trimethyl-azanium
- CAS Number: 58066-85-6
- PubChem CID: 3599
- DrugBank: DB09031
- ChemSpider: 3473
- UNII: 53EY29W7EC
- KEGG: D02494
- ChEBI: CHEBI:75283
- ChEMBL: ChEMBL125
- NIAID ChemDB: 130571
- CompTox Dashboard (EPA): DTXSID7045942
- ECHA InfoCard: 100.151.328

Chemical and physical data
- Formula: C_{21}H_{46}NO_{4}P
- Molar mass: 407.576 g·mol^{−1}
- 3D model (JSmol): Interactive image
- Melting point: 232 to 234 °C (450 to 453 °F)
- SMILES: [O-]P(=O)(OCCCCCCCCCCCCCCCC)OCC[N+](C)(C)C
- InChI: InChI=1S/C21H46NO4P/c1-5-6-7-8-9-10-11-12-13-14-15-16-17-18-20-25-27(23,24)26-21-19-22(2,3)4/h5-21H2,1-4H3; Key:PQLXHQMOHUQAKB-UHFFFAOYSA-N

Miltefosine, sold under the trade name Impavido among others, is a medication mainly used to treat leishmaniasis and infectious diseases caused by Naegleria fowleri (primary amoebic meningoencephalitis) and Balamuthia mandrillaris (granulomatous amoebic encephalitis). This includes the three forms of leishmaniasis: cutaneous, visceral and mucosal/mucocutaneous. It may be used with liposomal amphotericin B or paromomycin. It is taken by mouth.

Common side effects include vomiting, abdominal pain, fever, headaches, and decreased kidney function. More severe side effects may include Stevens–Johnson syndrome or low blood platelets. Use during pregnancy appears to cause harm to the baby and use during breastfeeding is not recommended. How it works is not entirely clear.

Miltefosine was first made in the early 1980s and studied as a treatment for cancer. A few years later it was found to be useful for leishmaniasis and was approved for this use in 2002 in India. It is on the World Health Organization's List of Essential Medicines.

== Medical uses ==
=== Leishmaniasis ===
Miltefosine is primarily used for the treatment of visceral and New World cutaneous leishmaniasis, and is undergoing clinical trials for this use in several countries. This drug is now listed as a core medication for the treatment of leishmaniasis under the WHO Model List of Essential Medicines. Several medical agents have some efficacy against visceral or cutaneous leishmaniasis, however, a 2005 survey concluded that miltefosine is the only effective oral treatment for both forms of leishmaniasis.

=== Amoeba infections ===
Miltefosine has been used successfully in some cases of the very rare, but highly lethal, brain infection by the amoeba, Naegleria fowleri, acquired through water entering the nose during a plunge in contaminated water. It has orphan drug status in the United States for acanthamoeba keratitis and primary amebic meningoencephalitis (PAM).

=== Pregnancy and breastfeeding ===
Miltefosine is listed as pregnancy category D by the FDA. This means there is evidence-based adverse reaction data from investigational or marketing experience or studies in humans of harm to the human fetus. Despite this evidence, the potential benefits of miltefosine may warrant use of the drug in pregnant women despite potential risks. A pregnancy test should be done prior to starting treatment. Effective birth control should be used while on miltefosine and 5 months after discontinuation of treatment. Its use during breast feeding is most likely unsafe.

== Contraindications ==
Miltefosine is contraindicated in individuals who have a hypersensitivity to this medication, pregnant women, and people who have the Sjögren-Larsson syndrome. It is embryotoxic and fetotoxic in rats and rabbits, and teratogenic in rats but not in rabbits. It is therefore contraindicated for use during pregnancy, and contraception is required beyond the end of treatment in women of child-bearing age.

== Side effects ==
Common side effects from miltefosine treatment are nausea and vomiting, which occur in 60% of people. Other common side effects are dizziness, headache, and daytime sleepiness.

Serious side effects include rash, diarrhea, and arthritis. The side effects are more severe in women and young children. The overall effects are quite mild and easily reversed.

== Mechanism of action ==
Miltefosine primarily acts on Leishmania by affecting the species's promastigote and amastigote stages. Miltefosine exerts its activity by interacting with lipids, inhibiting cytochrome c oxidase and causing apoptosis-like cell death. This may affect membrane integrity and mitochondrial function of the parasite.

== History ==
=== Cancer ===
While initially studied as a cancer medication, due to side effects it was never used for this purpose.

Phospholipid group alkylphosphocholine were known since the early 1980s, particularly in terms of their binding affinity with cobra venom. In 1987 the phospholipids were found to be potent toxins on leukemic cell culture. Initial in vivo investigation on the antineoplastic activity showed positive result, but then only at high dosage and at high toxicity. At the same time in Germany, Hansjörg Eibl, at the Max Planck Institute for Biophysical Chemistry, and Clemens Unger, at the University of Göttingen, demonstrated that the antineoplastic activity of the phospholipid analogue miltefosine (at the time known as hexadecylphosphocholine) was indeed tumour-specific. It was highly effective against methylnitrosourea-induced mammary carcinoma, but less so on transplantable mammary carcinomas and autochthonous benzo(a)pyrene-induced sarcomas, and relatively inactive on Walker 256 carcinosarcoma and autochthonous acetoxymethylmethylnitrosamine-induced colonic tumors of rats. It was subsequently found that miltefosine was structurally unique among lipids having anticancer property in that it lacks the glycerol group, is highly selective on cell types and acts through different mechanism.

=== Leishmaniasis ===
In the same year as the discovery of the anticancer property, miltefosine was reported by S. L. Croft and his team at the London School of Hygiene and Tropical Medicine as having antileishmanial effect as well. The compound was effective against Leishmania donovani amastigotes in cultured mouse peritoneal macrophages at a dose of 12.8 mg/kg/day in a five-day course. However, priority was given to the development of the compound for cutaneous metastases of breast cancer. In 1992 a new research was reported in which the compound was highly effective in mouse against different life cycle stages of different Leishmania species, and in fact, more potent than the conventional sodium stibogluconate therapy by a factor of more than 600. Results of the first clinical trial in humans were reported from Indian patients with chronic leishmaniasis with high degree of success and safety. This promising development promulgated a unique public–private partnership collaboration between ASTA Medica (later Zentaris GmbH), the World Health Organization (WHO) Special Programme for Research and Training in Tropical Diseases, and the Government of India. Eventually, several successful Phase II and III trials led to the approval of miltefosine in 2002 as the first and only oral drug for leishmaniasis.

=== Naegleria fowleri and Acanthamoeba ===
In 2013, the US Centers for Disease Control and Prevention recommended miltefosine for the treatment of free-living amoeba infections such as granulomatous amoebic encephalitis and primary amoebic meningoencephalitis, two fatal protozoal diseases. Historically, only four survivors have been recorded out of 138 confirmed infections in North America. One American survived the infection in 1978 and one individual from Mexico in 2003. In 2013, two children survived and recovered from primary amoebic meningoencephalitis after treatment with miltefosine. In 2016 after treatment that included miltefosine, another child became the fourth person in the United States to survive Naegleria fowleri infection.

== Society and culture ==
=== Availability ===
Since 2017 Miltefosine is commercially available in the United States through Profounda. Previously one could only get it from the CDC for emergency use under an expanded access IND protocol for treatment of free-living amoeba (FLA) infections: primary amoebic meningoencephalitis caused by Naegleria fowleri and granulomatous amoebic encephalitis caused by Balamuthia mandrillaris and Acanthamoeba species. Miltefosine is almost exclusively produced by Profounda, a private pharmaceutical company.

=== Economics ===
In the developing world a course of treatment costs US$65 to $150. In the developed world treatment may be 10 to 50 times greater.

== Further research ==
It is active against some bacteria and fungi, as well as human trematode Schistosoma mansoni and the snail that spreads it Biomphalaria alexandrina.

=== Antiprotozoal and antifungal activities ===
Miltefosine is being investigated by researchers interested in finding treatments for infections which have become resistant to existing drugs. Animal and in vitro studies suggest it may have broad anti-protozoal and anti-fungal properties:

- Animal studies suggest miltefosine may also be effective against Trypanosoma cruzi, the parasite responsible for Chagas' disease.
- Several studies have found the drug to be effective against types of fungus: Cryptococcus neoformans, Candida, Aspergillus and Fusarium.
- A 2006 in vitro study found that miltefosine is effective against metronidazole-resistant variants of Trichomonas vaginalis, a sexually transmitted protozoal disease.
- Cetrimonium bromide, a compound related to miltefosine, was demonstrated in 2007 to exhibit potent in vitro activity against Plasmodium falciparum.
- An in vitro test in 2006 showed that miltefosine is effective against the deadly protozoan pathogens, Naegleria fowleri, Balamuthia mandrillaris, and Acanthamoeba. However, later in vitro and animal model experiments showed that it is not as potent as other drugs, such as chlorpromazine (Thorazine) and diminazene aceturate (Berenil).
- In 2013, there were reports of failure of miltefosine in the treatment of leishmaniasis. Although drug resistance was suspected, studies in 2014 reported that miltefosine is not very effective in children, most probably related to PKPD issues with this drug. Moverover, males appeared to have a higher probability of relapse as well.
- A 2012 in vitro study found that miltefosine had promising activity against Candida albicans biofilms.

=== Anti-HIV activity ===
Miltefosine targets HIV infected macrophages, which play a role in vivo as long-lived HIV-1 reservoirs. The HIV protein Tat activates pro-survival PI3K/Akt pathway in primary human macrophages. Miltefosine acts by inhibiting the PI3K/Akt pathway, thus removing the infected macrophages from circulation, without affecting healthy cells. It significantly reduces replication of HIV-1 in cocultures of human dendritic cells (DCs) and CD4^{+} T cells, which is due to a rapid secretion of soluble factors and is associated with induction of type-I interferon (IFN) in the human cells.
