= Meglumine antimoniate =

Chemical compound

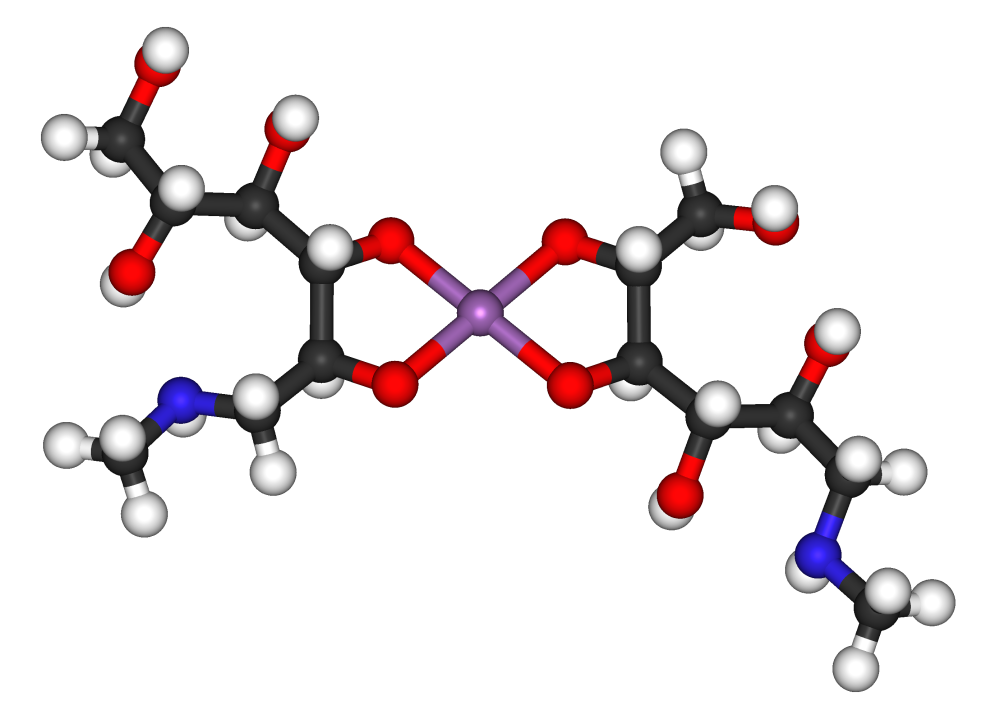

Clinical data
- Other names: Meglumine antimonate
- AHFS/Drugs.com: Micromedex Detailed Consumer Information
- ATC code: P01CB01 (WHO) QP51DX01 (WHO)

Identifiers
- IUPAC name: Hydroxy-dioxostiborane; (2R,3R,4R,5S)-6-methylaminohexane-1,2,3,4,5-pentol
- CAS Number: 133-51-7
- PubChem CID: 64953
- ChemSpider: 58479
- UNII: 75G4TW236W
- ChEMBL: ChEMBL239129
- NIAID ChemDB: 008733
- CompTox Dashboard (EPA): DTXSID4043935
- ECHA InfoCard: 100.004.645

Chemical and physical data
- Formula: Variable
- Molar mass: Variable
- 3D model (JSmol): Interactive image
- SMILES: O=[Sb](=O)O.O[C@@H]([C@@H](O)[C@H](O)[C@@H](O)CNC)CO
- InChI: InChI=1S/C7H17NO5.H2O.2O.Sb/c1-8-2-4(10)6(12)7(13)5(11)3-9;;;;/h4-13H,2-3H2,1H3;1H2;;;/q;;;;+1/p-1/t4-,5+,6+,7+;;;;/m0..../s1; Key:XOGYVDXPYVPAAQ-SESJOKTNSA-M

Meglumine antimoniate is a medicine used to treat leishmaniasis. This includes visceral, mucocutaneous, and cutaneous leishmaniasis. It is given by injection into a muscle or into the area infected.

Side effects include loss of appetite, nausea, abdominal pain, cough, feeling tired, muscle pain, irregular heartbeat, and kidney problems. It should not be used in people with significant heart, liver, or kidney problems. It is not recommended during breastfeeding. It belongs to a group of medications known as the pentavalent antimonials.

Meglumine antimoniate came into medical use in 1946. It is on the World Health Organization's List of Essential Medicines. It is available in Southern Europe and Latin America but not the United States.

== Society and culture ==
It is manufactured by Aventis and sold as Glucantime in France, and Glucantim in Italy.

== See also ==
- Meglumine
