= Pentavalent antimonial =

Drug for treatment of leishmaniasis

Pentavalent antimonials (also abbreviated pentavalent Sb or Sb^{V}) are a group of compounds used for the treatment of leishmaniasis. They are also called pentavalent antimony compounds.

== Types ==
The first pentavalent antimonial, urea stibamine, was synthesised by the Indian scientist Upendranath Brahmachari in 1922. Though it caused a dramatic decline in deaths due to leishmaniasis, it fell out of favour in the 1950s due to higher toxicity compared to sodium stibogluconate.

The compounds currently available for clinical use are:

- sodium stibogluconate (Pentostam; manufactured by GlaxoSmithKline; available in United States [through the Centers for Disease Control only] and UK), which is administered by slow intravenous injection.
- meglumine antimoniate (Glucantim; manufactured by Aventis; available in Brazil, France and Italy), which is administered by intramuscular or intravenous injection.

The pentavalent antimonials can only be given by injection: there are no oral preparations available.

== Alternatives ==
In many countries, widespread resistance to antimony has meant that liposomal amphotericin or miltefosine are now used in preference.

== Side effects ==
Cardiotoxicity, reversible kidney failure, pancreatitis, anemia, leukopenia, rash, headache, abdominal pain, nausea, vomiting, arthralgia, myalgia, thrombocytopenia, and transaminase elevation.
