= Poonam Salotra =

Indian medical researcher

Poonam Salotra is an Indian scientist and researcher, appointed as Consultant at the ICMR-National Institute of Pathology (NIP) whose work is centered on infectious diseases like Visceral Leishmaniasis (VL), Anthrax, Tuberculosis and Cholera. Her research covers the development of diagnostic tests and attenuated vaccines, drug resistance and immune responses for patients with Leishmaniasis in some form.

== Education ==
Poonam Salotra received her Ph.D. from Delhi University and has conducted postdoctoral studies from Roche Institute of Molecular Biology, New Jersey, USA.

== Career ==
Dr. Salotra was the Director-in-charge of the National Institute of Pathology (NIP), an institute under the Indian Council of Medical Research at the Safdarjung Hospital Campus in New Delhi and superannuated in October 2017. Prior to this she has been the chief of the Molecular Biology Lab at the Institute of Pathology as well as Senior Deputy Director at the National Institute of Pathology. She is an elected Fellow of Indian National Science Academy, The World Academy of Sciences, National Academy of Sciences(India) and Academy of Medical Sciences. She is an appointed member of the Medical and Health Sciences Advisory Committee of the World Academy of Sciences and a member of the World Health Organization's Advisory Panel on Parasitic Diseases. She was conferred National Woman Bioscientist-2018 Award by Department of Biotechnology, India. She has published more than 120 academic papers and holds two US patents as well two India patents, all related to Leishmaniasis.

She has 18 years of teaching experience New Delhi, and has been the chief supervisor of a number of doctoral theses. She has 35 years of total research experience. She is married to Roop Salotra, who retired as CEO and President of SRF Ltd, and is currently Independent Director in various Indian companies.

== Research ==
Dr. Salotra's research is centered on parasitology and infectious diseases like Visceral Leishmaniasis (VL), Anthrax, Tuberculosis and Cholera.

Her research especially covers the development of diagnostic tests and attenuated vaccines, and the study of drug resistance and immune responses in patients with Leishmaniasis, a disease spread by the bite of certain types of sandflies that kills between 20 000 – 50 000 people each year. Dr. Salotra's focus has been on two of the three main ways that the disease is present – Visceral Leishmaniasis (VL) and Cutaneous Leishmaniasis.
