= Haralampie Manchev =

- Born: March 3, 1898; Kocani, Ottoman Empire
- Died: January 14, 1974 (aged 75); Skopje, SR Macedonia, SFR Yugoslavia
- Citizenship: Yugoslavia
- Known for: research on the diagnosis and treatment of Kala-Azar
- Scientific career
- Fields: Medicine; Paediatrics
- Institutions: Paediatric Clinic Skopje; Faculty of Medicine in Skopje at Ss. Cyril and Methodius University of Skopje

Haralampie Manchev (Macedonian: Харалампие Манчев) (Kocani, March 3, 1898 – Skopje, January 14, 1974) was the first Macedonian medical research scientist who studying the child pathology, found some important specifics.

Manchev studied medicine in Vienna and graduated in Belgrade immediately after the First World War, but could not work in the hospital institution after the one-year medical internship. Got a place as outpatient doctor in dispensaries social diseases of the Hygiene Institute in Skopje, after a number of cases of malaria in all shapes, child malnutrition, infectious childhood diseases protracted convalescence.

During the Second World War go to specialization in pediatric clinic in Sofia, where he met with Dr. Asparuh Panov, who showed his own material haematological changes in anemia of Kulej. Manchev started to investigate the incidence of Mediterranean anemia Kulej, where asking for malarial parasites found strange formation (leishmaniasis) in punktatite children with huge spleens and livers. Revealing leishmaniasis epidemic in Macedonia gave impetus to many researchers to detect leishmaniasis in other areas. More than 100 children were quickly diagnosed him and treated with specific chemotherapy with antiparasitic activity and clinical, a kind ex juvantibus.

He was associate professor of environmental theme of Kala-azar (KA). Dr. Haralmpie Manchev, who first described this parasitosis in children in Macedonia, a disease caused by leishmaniasis, the vector of the parasite from infected animals (dogs, ferrets and other tropical beasts) with gnat known to us as papatachi (ph. Flebotomus paptacei).

Haralampie Manchev is the first head of the department at Children's Hospital in Skopje Temporal (1946), first director of the Children's Clinic (1947) and then worked as a doctor in the Special Clinic for lung diseases in children "Kozle". He was the first editor of a medical expert scientific journal Macedonian medical examination issued by the Macedonian Medical Association and the first president of the Association of pediatricians of Macedonia.

Manchev died after a long illness on 14 January 1974 in Skopje.
