= Upendranath Brahmachari =

Indian physician (1873–1946)

Rai Bahadur Sir Upendranath Brahmachari FRSM FRS
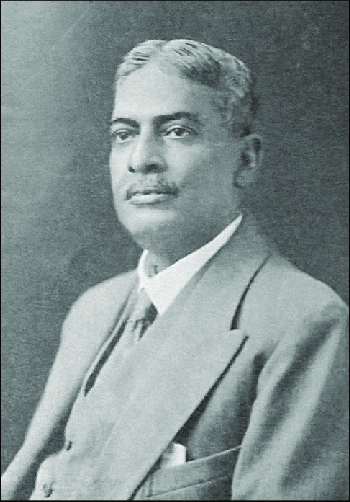
- Sir Upendranath Brahmachari
- Born: 19 December 1873; Sardanga, Purbasthali, Bengal Presidency, British India
- Died: 6 February 1946 (aged 72); Calcutta, Bengal Presidency, British India
- Education: Eastern Railways Boys' High School, Jamalpur; Hooghly Mohsin College; Presidency University, Kolkata; University of Calcutta
- Spouse: Nani Bala Devi
- Children: Phanindra Nath, Brahmachari Nirmal, Kumar Brahmachari
- Awards: Kaisar-i-Hind Gold Medal (1924); Rai Bahadur award (1924); Knighthood (1934); Fellow of the Royal Society of Medicine, London
- Scientific career
- Fields: Medicine, Physician
- Workplaces: University of Calcutta; Campbell Medical School (now Nil Ratan Sircar Medical College and Hospital); Carmichael Medical College (now R. G. Kar Medical College and Hospital); Dhaka Medical College and Hospital; Calcutta Medical College; National Medical Institute; Indian Council of Medical Research; University College of Science, Calcutta; Indian Red Cross Society; Calcutta School of Tropical Medicine; Zoological Garden, Kolkata
- Doctoral advisor: Sir Gerald Bomford

Rai Bahadur Sir Upendranath Brahmachari FRSM FRS (19 December 1873 – 6 February 1946) was a prominent Indian physician and scientist. In 1922, he synthesised urea-stibamine (carbostibamide) and demonstrated its effectiveness in treating kala-azar (visceral leishmaniasis).

== Early life ==
Brahmachari was born on 19 December 1873 in Sardanga village near Purbasthali, District Burdwan, West Bengal, India. His father, Nilmony Brahmachari, was a physician in East Indian Railways and his mother was Saurabh Sundari Devi. He completed his early education from Eastern Railways Boys' High School in Jamalpur, Bihar. In 1893, he earned a BA degree from Hooghly Mohsin College with honours in Mathematics and Chemistry. Following this, Brahmachari pursued further studies in Medicine and Higher Chemistry. In 1894, he obtained a master's degree from Presidency College, Kolkata. In 1898, he married Nani Bala Devi.

In the 1900 M.B. Examination of the University of Calcutta, Brahmachari excelled – first in Medicine and then in Surgery – for which he received the Goodeve and Macleod awards. He earned an MD degree in 1902 and a PhD in 1904 for his research paper on "Studies in Haemolysis", both from the University of Calcutta.

== Life and career ==
In 1922, Brahmachari discovered a new form of leishmaniasis, which he called dermal leishmanoid. The condition was marked by the appearance of sudden eruptions on the patients’ faces without fever or other symptoms. Brahmachari observed it in partially cured cases of kala-azar as well as in individuals who had no prior history of the disease at all. It has since been termed as post-kala-azar dermal leishmaniasis.

== Awards and honours ==
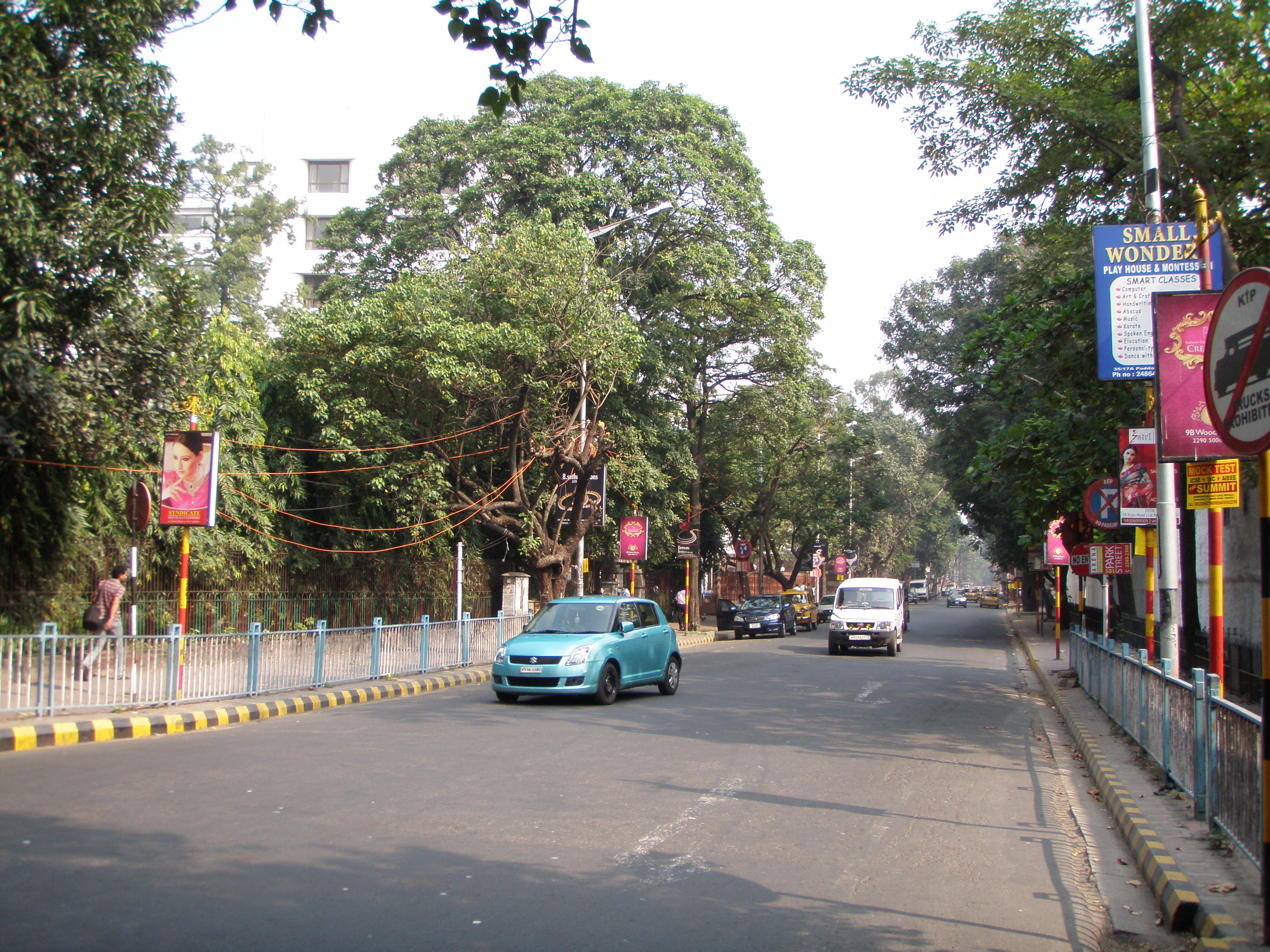
Dr. U. N. Brahmachari street renamed from Loudon street, beside Minto park, Kolkata.

Brahmachari was awarded the title of Rai Bahadur and the Kaisar-i-Hind Gold Medal, 1st Class, in the 1924 Birthday Honours by the Governor General Lord Lytton. In 1934, he was conferred a knighthood by the British Government.

Brahmachari was a nominee for the Nobel Prize twice in 1929 and five times in 1942 in the category of physiology or medicine although he never received it. Some sources suggest that his ethnicity may have influenced the Nobel committee's decision. He served as president of the 23rd session of the Indian Science Congress in Indore (1936) and was also president of the Indian Chemical Society in Calcutta (1936). Brahmachari was honoured with fellowships from the Royal Society of Medicine, London, and the Indian National Science Academy. He was the President of the Asiatic Society of Bengal for two years (1928–29) and also the vice-chairman of the board of Trustees of the Indian Museum.

A 6 storey UNB building named after him has been established at Nil Ratan Sircar Medical College and Hospital that houses the Emergency, Medicine, Cardiology and Radiology departments.

== Important works ==
The miracle of urea stibamine, drawn by Upendranath Brahmachari himself. The death rate was drastically declined from nearly 6300 to 750 within ten years in Assam.

Dr. Brahmachari had over 144 Scientific Publications and had written several books, a partial list of which include:

1. Studies in Haemolysis, Calcutta University, 1909.
2. Kala-Azar : Its treatment, Butterworth & Co. Ltd. Calcutta 1917.
3. Kala-Azar in Doctor Carl Mense's Handbuch der Tropenkranahaiten, vol. IV, 1926.
4. Treatise on Kala-Azar, John Bale, Son's & Danielsson Ltd., London, 1928.
5. Campaign against Kala-Azar in India, Jubilee Publication on the 80th birthday of Dr. Prof. Bernhard Nocht, Hamburg, clique aqui 1937.
6. Progress of Medical Research work in India during the last 25 years, and progress of Science in India, during the past 25 years, Indian Science Congress Association 1938.
7. Gleanings from my Researchers Vol. I, Calcutta University 1940
8. Gleanings from my Researchers Vol. II Calcutta University 1941
9. Infantile Biliary Cirrhosis in India in British Encyclopedia of Medical practice. Edited by Sir Humphrey Rolleston
