= North China Mission in the Province of Honan =

In 1888, seven Canadian missionaries from the Presbyterian Church of Canada (later merged to form the United Church of Canada) established the North China Mission in the Province of Honan, located in current day Henan, China. The original group included Dr. William McClure, notable for research on visceral leishmaniasis disease, and Jonathan Goforth. Dr. Jean Dow joined the mission in 1895. Medicine was a key tool used by the mission to evangelize the people of the North Honan province. Extensive stays in missionary hospitals, gave medical missionaries plenty of time to preach to and teach patients about the word of God.

== Founding ==
In 1888, Hudson Taylor, the founder of the China Inland Mission, warned Jonathan Goforth of the anti-foreigner sentiments prevalent in the North Honan region. He said:

Brother, if you would enter that Province [Honan], you must go forward on your knees.

Taylor's warning proved to be true. The anti-foreign sentiments held by the people in the province of Honan China proved to be an obstacle to missionary work. Eventually, the mission was able to thrive and began to establish hospitals and work with the people in the region. However, this process did not happen immediately.

== Female medical providers ==
In the north Honan province of China during the late 1800s and into the 20th century, due to cultural reasons, male medical missionaries were not allowed to treat female patients. As a result, female medical missionaries became essential to the North China Mission as they were the only ones able to spread religion to female patients and residents of the region. Harriet Sutherland was one of the first seven missionaries to arrive in the North China Mission. She was the first Canadian nurse to work in a Canadian mission in China. From 1888 to around 1950, the Woman's Missionary Society sent twenty-one unmarried nurses to the work in the North China Mission.

== Notable Members of the North Honan Mission ==
Missionary	Year Arrived
Dr. William McClure	1888
Jonathan Goforth	1888
J. Frazer Smith	1888
Harriet Sutherland	1888
Margaret I MacIntosh	1889–1927
Dr. Lucinda Graham	1892
Dr. Jean Isabelle Dow	1895–1927
