= Leishmaniasis =

Disease caused by parasites of the Leishmania type

- Other names: Leishmaniosis
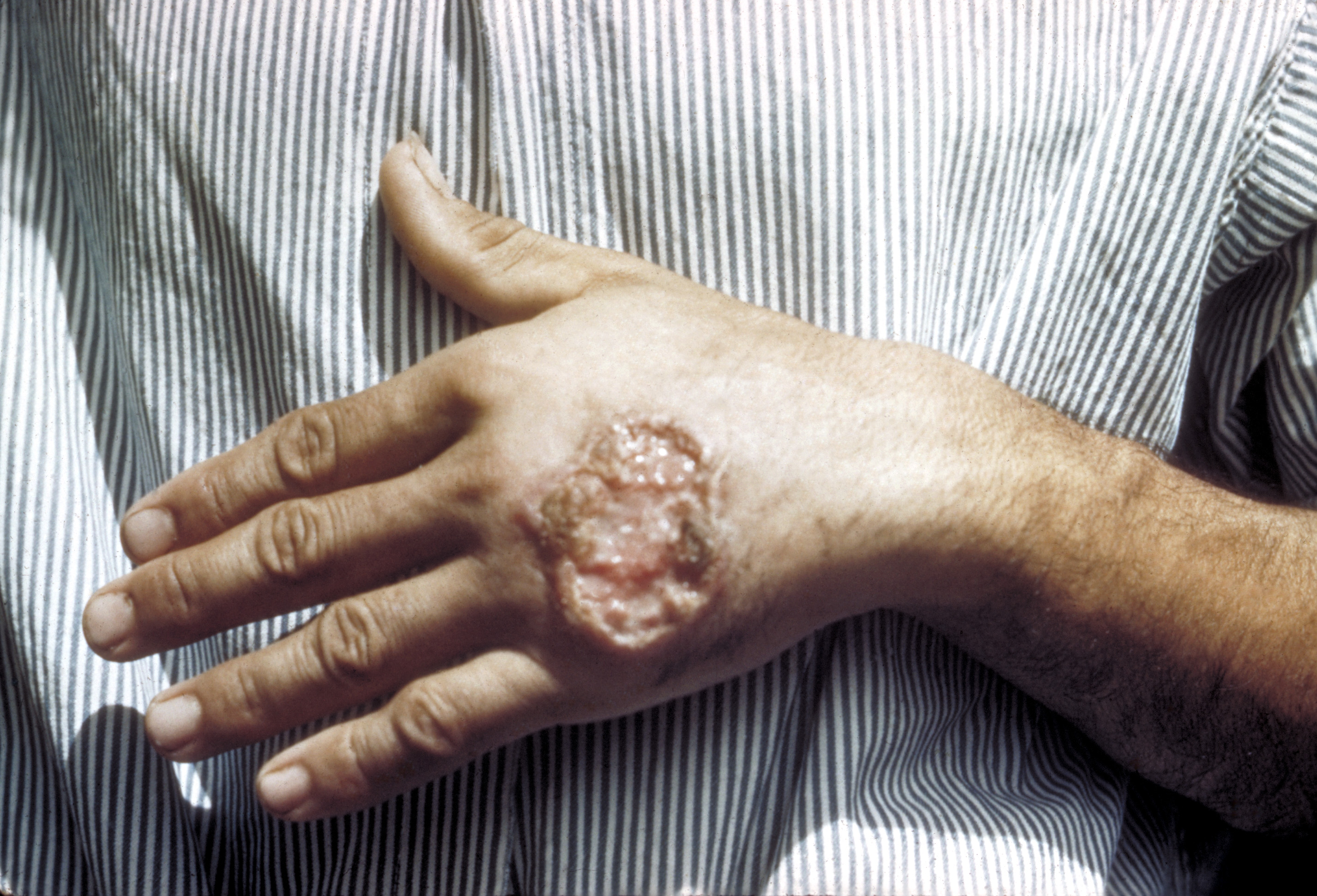
- Cutaneous leishmaniasis in the hand of a Central American adult
- Pronunciation: Leishmaniasis /ˌliːʃməˈnaɪəsɪs/ leishmaniosis /liːʃˌmeɪniˈoʊsɪs, -ˌmæni-/
- Specialty: Infectious disease
- Symptoms: Skin ulcers, fever, low red blood cells, enlarged liver
- Causes: Leishmania parasites spread by sandflies
- Prevention: Bug nets, insecticide
- Frequency: 4–12 million
- Deaths: 24,200 (2015)

Leishmaniasis is a wide array of clinical manifestations caused by protozoal parasites of the Trypanosomatida genus Leishmania. It is generally spread through the bite of phlebotomine sandflies, Phlebotomus and Lutzomyia, and occurs most frequently in the tropics and sub-tropics of Africa, Asia, the Americas, and southern Europe. The disease can present in three main ways: cutaneous, mucocutaneous, or visceral. The cutaneous form presents with skin ulcers, while the mucocutaneous form presents with ulcers of the skin, mouth, and nose. The visceral form starts with skin ulcers and later presents with fever, low red blood cell count, and enlarged spleen and liver.

Infections in humans are caused by more than 20 species of Leishmania. Risk factors include poverty, malnutrition, deforestation, and urbanization. All three types can be diagnosed by seeing the parasites under microscopy. Additionally, visceral disease can be diagnosed by blood tests.

Leishmaniasis can be partly prevented by sleeping under nets treated with insecticide. Other measures include spraying insecticides to kill sandflies and treating people with the disease early to prevent further spread. The treatment needed is determined by where the disease is acquired, the species of Leishmania, and the type of infection. Recent research in leishmaniasis treatment explores combination therapies, nanotechnology-based drugs, and immunotherapy.

For cutaneous disease, paromomycin, fluconazole, or pentamidine may be effective.

About 4 to 12 million people are currently infected in some 98 countries. About 2 million new cases and between 20 and 50 thousand deaths occur each year. About 200 million people in Asia, Africa, South and Central America, and southern Europe live in areas where the disease is common. The World Health Organization has obtained discounts on some medications to treat the disease. It is classified as a neglected tropical disease. The disease may occur in a number of other animals, including dogs and rodents.

== Signs and symptoms ==
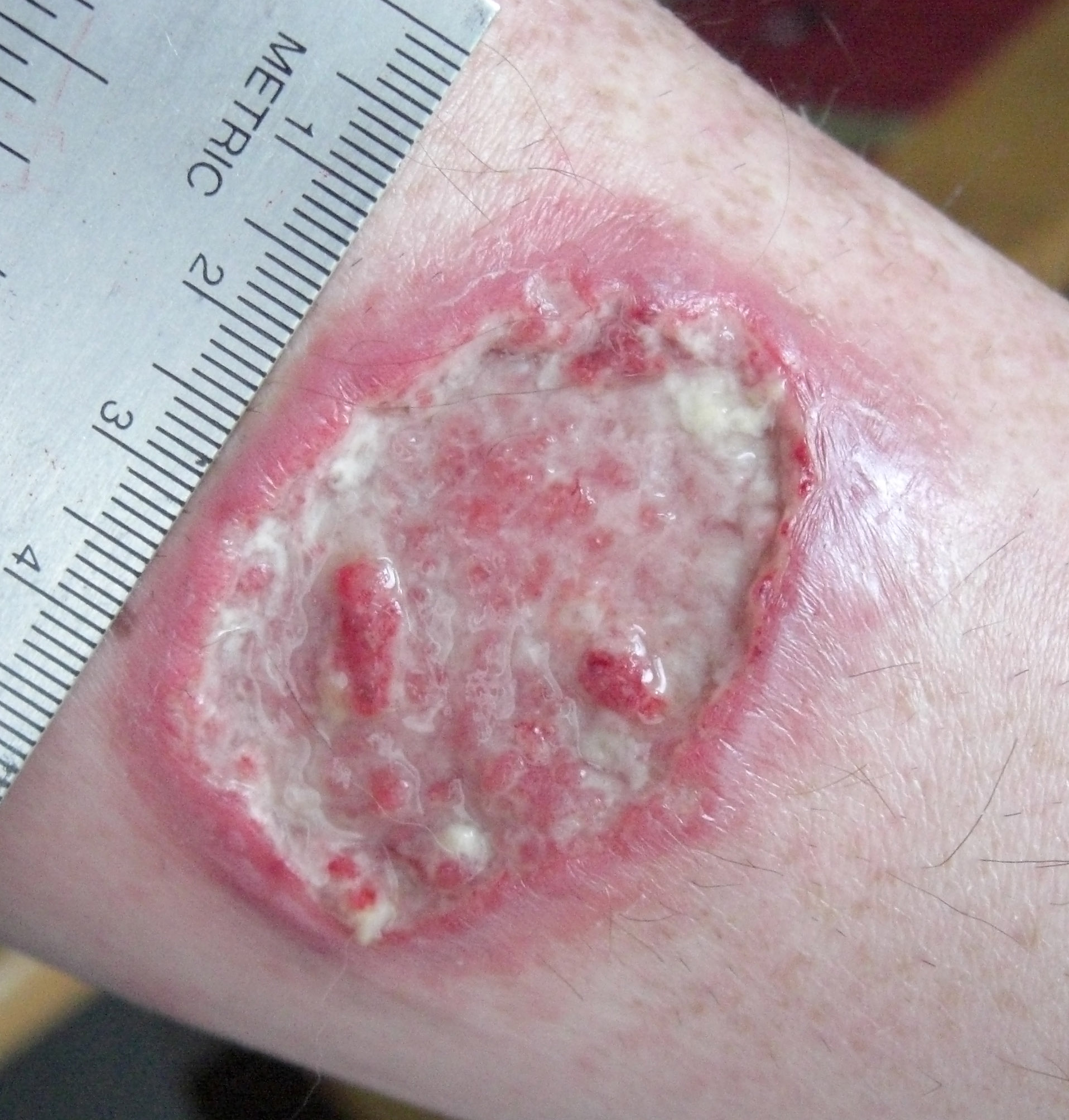
Cutaneous leishmaniasis ulcer

The symptoms of leishmaniasis are skin sores which erupt weeks to months after the person is bitten by infected sandflies.

Leishmaniasis may be divided into the following types:

- Cutaneous leishmaniasis is the most common form, which causes an open sore at each bite site, which heals in a few months to a year and a half, leaving an unpleasant-looking scar.
  - Diffuse cutaneous leishmaniasis produces widespread skin lesions which resemble leprosy, and may not heal on their own.

- Mucocutaneous leishmaniasis causes both skin and mucosal ulcers with damage primarily of the nose and mouth.
- Visceral leishmaniasis or kala-azar ('black fever') is the most serious form and is generally fatal if untreated. Other consequences, which can occur a few months to years after infection, include fever, damage to the spleen and liver, and anemia.

== Cause ==
Lifecycle of Leishmania

Leishmaniasis is transmitted by the bite of infected female phlebotomine sandflies which can transmit the protozoa Leishmania. The sandflies inject the infective stage, metacyclic promastigotes, during blood meals. Metacyclic promastigotes in the puncture wound are phagocytized by macrophages, and transform into amastigotes. Amastigotes multiply in infected cells and affect different tissues, depending in part on the host, and in part on which Leishmania species is involved. These differing tissue specificities cause the differing clinical manifestations of the various forms of leishmaniasis. Sandflies become infected during blood meals on infected hosts when they ingest macrophages infected with amastigotes. In the sandfly's midgut, the parasites differentiate into promastigotes, which multiply, differentiate into metacyclic promastigotes, and migrate to the proboscis.

The genomes of three Leishmania species (L. major, L. infantum, and L. braziliensis) have been sequenced, and this has provided much information about the biology of the parasite. For example, in Leishmania, protein-coding genes are understood to be organized as large polycistronic units in a head-to-head or tail-to-tail manner; RNA polymerase II transcribes long polycistronic messages in the absence of defined RNA pol II promoters, and Leishmania has unique features concerning the regulation of gene expression in response to changes in the environment. The new knowledge from these studies may help identify new targets for urgently needed drugs and aid the development of vaccines.

=== Vector ===
Although most of the literature mentions only one genus transmitting Leishmania to humans (Lutzomyia) in the New World, a 2003 study by Galati suggested a new classification for New World sand flies, elevating several subgenera to the genus level. Elsewhere in the world, the genus Phlebotomus is considered the vector of leishmaniasis.

=== Possible non-human reservoirs ===
Some cases of infection of non-human animals of human-infecting species of Leishmania have been observed. In one study, L. major was identified in twelve out of ninety-one wild western lowland gorilla fecal samples and in a study of fifty-two captive non-human primates under zoo captivity in a leishmaniasis endemic area, eight (all three chimpanzees, three golden lion tamarins, a tufted capuchin, and an Angolan talapoin), were found to be infected with L. infantum and capable of infecting Lutzomyia longipalpis sand flies, although "parasite loads in infected sand flies observed in this study were considered low".

=== Organisms ===
Visceral disease is usually caused by Leishmania donovani, L. infantum, or L. chagasi, but occasionally these species may cause other forms of disease. The cutaneous form of the disease is caused by more than 15 species of Leishmania.

=== Risk factors ===
Risk factors include malnutrition, deforestation, lack of sanitation, suppressed immune system, and urbanization.

- Socioeconomic conditions: Poor living conditions like overcrowded housing and inadequate sanitation are associated with increased human exposure to sandflies. Poor waste management and open sewage create ideal breeding grounds for sandflies in rural and low-income urban areas. Limited access to healthcare may delay diagnosis and treatment, which can contribute to more severe disease outcomes. Poor individuals may face a financial barrier to treatment, increasing their risk of severe disease.
- Malnutrition: Deficiencies in protein, iron, vitamin A, and zinc weaken the immune system, making it harder to fight Leishmania infections. This increases the risk of both cutaneous and visceral leishmaniasis, leading to more severe illness and poor treatment outcomes.
- Population Mobility: Migration and displacement due to conflict, economic hardship, or environmental changes contribute to the spread of leishmaniasis, particularly when non-immune individuals enter endemic areas. Refugees and seasonal agricultural workers are at higher risk due to limited access to vector control measures. Human activity in previously uninhabited lands may increase exposure to infected sandflies and wildlife reservoirs.
- Environmental and Climate Change: Temperature, humidity, and rainfall changes affect the sandfly population. Rising temperatures have been linked to higher sandfly survival and breeding rates, allowing the disease to spread into higher altitudes and previously unaffected regions, such as Southern Europe and North America. Deforestation, urbanization, and dam construction disturb sandfly habitats, creating new transmission hotspots and increasing the risk of outbreaks.

== Diagnosis ==
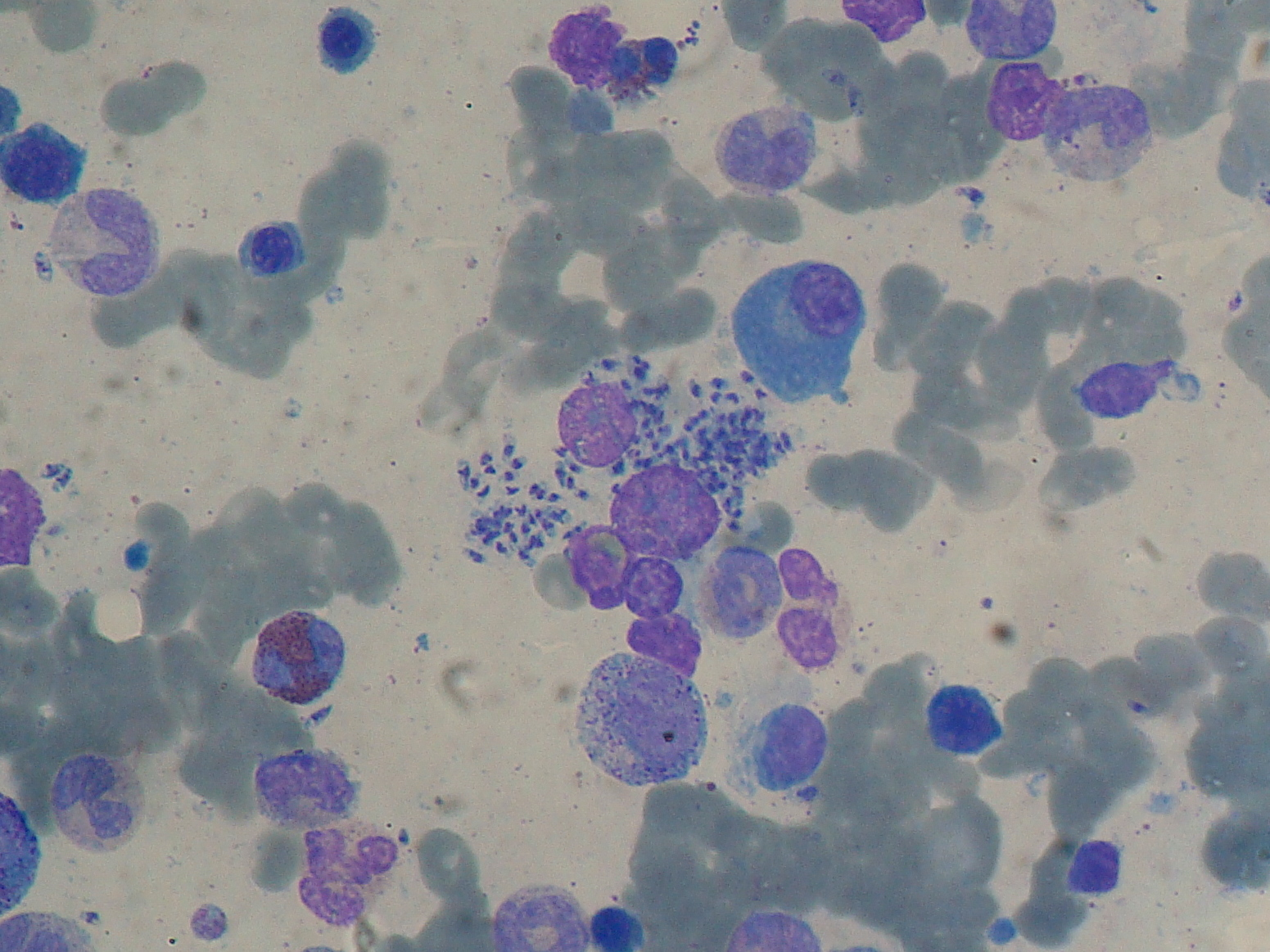
Bone marrow aspirate smear: visceral leishmaniasis

Leishmaniasis is diagnosed in the hematology laboratory by direct visualization of the amastigotes (Leishman–Donovan bodies). Buffy-coat preparations of peripheral blood or aspirates from marrow, spleen, lymph nodes, or skin lesions should be spread on a slide to make a thin smear and stained with Leishman stain or Giemsa stain (pH 7.2) for 20 minutes. Amastigotes are seen within blood and spleen monocytes or, less commonly, in circulating neutrophils and in aspirated tissue macrophages. They are small, round bodies 2–4 μm in diameter with indistinct cytoplasm, a nucleus, and a small, rod-shaped kinetoplast. Occasionally, amastigotes may be seen lying free between cells. However, the retrieval of tissue samples is often painful for the patient and identification of the infected cells can be difficult. So, other indirect immunological methods of diagnosis are developed, including enzyme-linked immunosorbent assay, antigen-coated dipsticks, and direct agglutination test. Although these tests are readily available, they are not the standard diagnostic tests due to their insufficient sensitivity and specificity.

Several different polymerase chain reaction (PCR) tests are available for the detection of Leishmania DNA. With this assay, a specific and sensitive diagnostic procedure is finally possible. The most sensitive PCR tests use minicircle kinetoplast DNA found in the parasite. Kinetoplast DNA contains sequences for mitochondrial proteins in its maxicircles (~25–50 per parasite), and guide RNA in its minicircles (~10,000 per parasite) of the kinetoplast. With this specific method, one can still detect Leishmania even with a very low parasite load. When needing to diagnose a specific species of Leishmania, as opposed to only detection, other PCR methods have been superior.

Most forms of the disease are transmitted only from nonhuman animals, but some can be spread between humans. Infections in humans are caused by about 21 of 30 species that infect mammals; the different species look the same, but they can be differentiated by isoenzyme analysis, DNA sequence analysis, or monoclonal antibodies.

== Prevention ==
Prevention of leishmaniasis focuses on reducing sandfly vector biting rates and treatment of human cases for predominantly human parasites like Leishmania donovani and Leishmania tropica, though the latter species has an important reservoir in rock hyraxes in Israel and possibly Saudi Arabia. Treatment of survivors of visceral leishmaniasis who develop presumably infectious cutaneous lesions associated with post-kala azar dermal leishmaniasis may prevent onward transmission. However, certain Leishmania species can be zoonotic, like Leishmania infantum, an important cause of visceral leishmaniasis in the Americas and Mediterranean region that affects both dogs and humans. Other species follow sylvatic cycles, with diverse wild animal reservoir hosts like rodents, armadillos or sloths. Thus, prevention strategies depend on the predominant Leishmania and sandfly species and the transmission cycles they mediate regionally.

=== Personal protection ===
- Using insect repellent on exposed skin and under the ends of sleeves and pant legs. Follow the instructions on the label of the repellent. The most effective repellents generally are those that contain the chemical DEET (N,N-diethylmetatoluamide)
- Leishmaniasis can be partly prevented by using nets treated with insecticide or insect repellent while sleeping. To provide good protection against sandflies, fine mesh sizes of 0.6 mm or less are required, but a mosquito net with 1.2mm mesh will provide a limited reduction in the number of sandfly bites. Finer mesh sizes have the downside of higher cost and reduced air circulation which can cause overheating. Many Phlebotomine sandfly attacks occur at sunset rather than at night, so it may also be useful to put nets over doors and windows or to use insect repellents.
- Use of insecticide-impregnated dog collars and treatment or culling of infected dogs.
- Spraying houses and animal shelters with insecticides.
- Prevention and control of leishmaniasis requires a multifaceted approach. Insecticide spraying, treated nets, and case management are commonly used strategies, while additional approaches are being explored for long-term disease control.

=== Vector control ===
- An integrated vector management (IVM) approach is key to reducing sand fly populations. Some of the latest strategies include:
- Research is ongoing into genetically modifying sand flies to reduce their ability to transmit Leishmania parasites.
- Attractive toxic sugar baits (ATSBs) attract and kill sand flies that feed on plant sugars.
- Spatial repellents and insecticidal paint create long-term barriers against sand flies.

=== Reservoir control ===
- Canine control measures: domestic dogs are major reservoirs for Leishmania infantum in regions where visceral leishmaniasis is common. Instead of widespread dog culling, which has been proven ineffective and controversial, deltamethrin-impregnated dog collars have been introduced as a safer and more effective alternative.
- Wildlife reservoirs: Controlling wild animal reservoirs such as rodents, marsupials, sloths, and armadillos is more challenging due to conservation concerns.
- Vaccination: Canine vaccinations have been developed and are now being used in some regions to reduce transmission. Human vaccinations are in development, with several candidates in clinical trials assessing their potential for long-term immunity.

== Treatment ==
Paromomycin is an inexpensive and effective treatment for leishmaniasis.

The treatment is determined by where the disease is acquired, the species of Leishmania, and the type of infection. For visceral leishmaniasis in India, South America, and the Mediterranean, liposomal amphotericin B is the recommended treatment and is often used as a single dose. Rates of cure with a single dose of amphotericin-B have been reported as 95%. In India, almost all infections are resistant to pentavalent antimonials. In Africa, a combination of pentavalent antimonials and paromomycin is recommended. These, however, can have significant side effects. Miltefosine, an oral medication, is effective against both visceral and cutaneous leishmaniasis. Side effects are generally mild, though it can cause birth defects if taken within three months of getting pregnant. It does not appear to work for L. major or L. braziliensis. Trifluralin, a herbicide, is shown to be effective treatment as ointment, without hemolytic or cell-toxic side-effects.

Recent research in leishmaniasis treatment explores combination therapies, nanotechnology-based drugs, and immunotherapy. Combination treatments, such as liposomal amphotericin B (L-AmB) with miltefosine or paromomycin, have shown high cure rates for visceral leishmaniasis while reducing treatment time and side effects. The WHO recommends miltefosine-based combination therapy for specific cases of visceral leishmaniasis. Nanotechnology-based treatments, including lipid and metallic nanoparticles, improve drug delivery by targeting parasites more precisely and reducing toxicity. Immune-modulating therapies, such as interferon-gamma (IFN-γ), are under investigation for their potential in enhancing immune responses against Leishmania infections.

The evidence around the treatment of cutaneous leishmaniasis is poor. Several topical treatments may be used for cutaneous leishmaniasis. Which treatments are effective depends on the strain, with topical paromomycin effective for L. major, L. tropica, L. mexicana, L. panamensis, and L. braziliensis. Pentamidine is effective for L. guyanensis. Oral fluconazole or itraconazole appears effective in L. major and L. tropica. There is limited evidence to support the use of heat therapy in cutaneous leishmaniasis as of 2015.

As of 2018, no studies have determined the effect of oral nutritional supplements on visceral leishmaniasis being treated with anti-leishmanial drug therapy. For the reason, it is not known if nutritional supplements are ineffective (or effective). Further research including high quality randomized controlled trials are needed to determine if supplements are helpful and if so, at what dose, to help people with VL who are undergoing treatment with anti-leishmanial medications.

The Institute for OneWorld Health has reintroduced the drug paromomycin for the treatment of leishmaniasis, results which led to its approval as an orphan drug. The Drugs for Neglected Diseases Initiative is also actively facilitating the search for novel therapeutics. A treatment with paromomycin will cost about US$10. The drug had originally been identified in the 1950s but had been abandoned because it would not be profitable, as the disease mostly affects poor people. The Indian government approved paromomycin for sale in August 2006.

By 2012 the World Health Organization had successfully negotiated with the manufacturers to achieve a reduced cost for liposomal amphotericin B, to US$18 a vial, but several vials are needed for treatment and it must be kept at a stable, cool temperature.

== Epidemiology ==
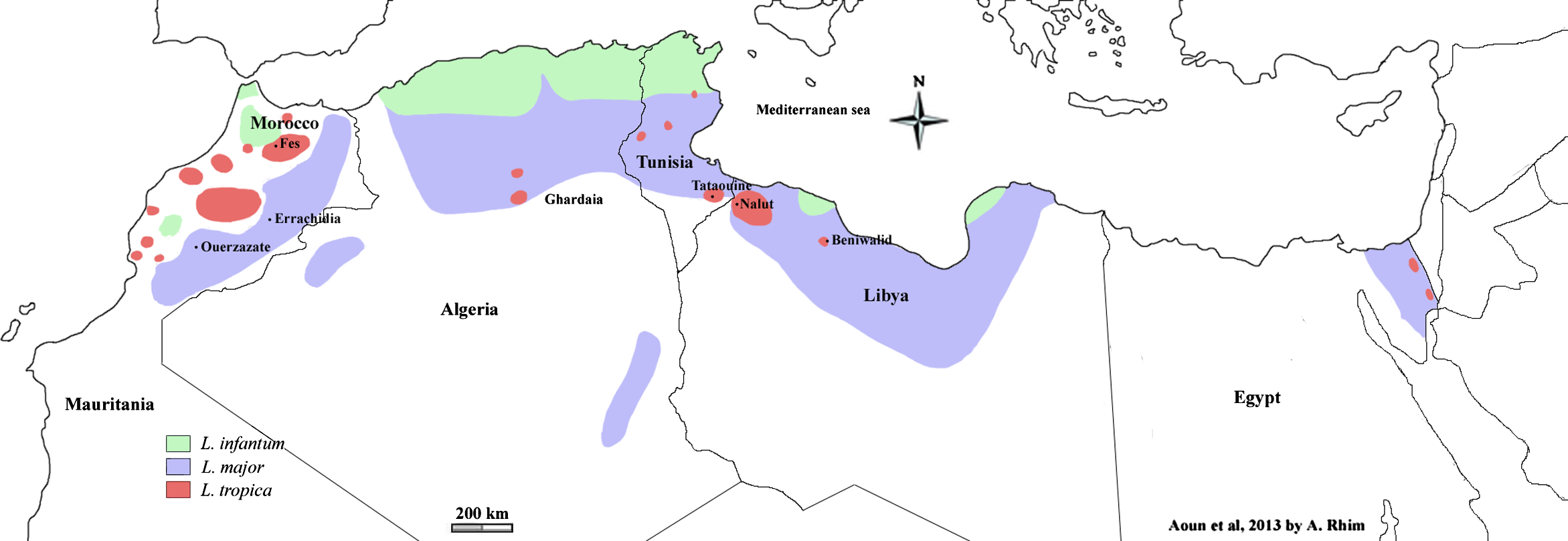
Cutaneous leishmaniasis in North Africa; Leishmania infantum = green, Leishmania major = blue, Leishmania tropica = red

Disability-adjusted life year for leishmaniasis per 100,000 inhabitants no data less than 20 20–30 30–40 40–50 50–60 60–70 70–80 80–100 100–120 120–150 150–200 more than 200

Out of 200 countries and territories reporting to WHO, 97 countries and territories are endemic for leishmaniasis. The settings in which leishmaniasis is found range from rainforests in Central and South America to deserts in western Asia and the Middle East. It affects as many as 12 million people worldwide. Leishmaniasis affect an estimated 700,000 to 1 million new cases annually, with over a billion people living in endemic areas at risk of infection. Visceral leishmaniasis is a fatal form with the potential for outbreak, causing, 50,000 to 90,000 cases worldwide each year. However only 25-45% are reported to the WHO. Cutaneous leishmaniasis is the most common form with 600,000 to 1 million new cases each year yet only 200,000 are officially reported. It is most common in Afghanistan, Algeria, Brazil, Colombia, and Iran. Mucocutaneous leishmaniasis is rarer with over 90% of cases occurring in Bolivia, Brazil, and Peru. The visceral form is most common in Bangladesh, Brazil, Ethiopia, India, and Sudan. In 2014, more than 90% of new cases reported to WHO occurred in six countries: Brazil, Ethiopia, India, Somalia, South Sudan and Sudan. As of 2010, it caused about 52,000 deaths, down from 87,000 in 1990.

Leishmaniasis is found through much of the Americas from northern Argentina to South Texas, though not in Uruguay or Chile, and has recently been shown to be spreading to North Texas and Oklahoma, and further expansion to the north may be facilitated by climate change as more habitat becomes suitable for vector and reservoir species for leishmaniasis. Leishmaniasis is also known as papalomoyo, papa lo moyo, úlcera de los chicleros, and chiclera in Latin America. During 2004, an estimated 3,400 troops from the Colombian army, operating in the jungles near the south of the country (in particular around the Meta and Guaviare departments), were infected with leishmaniasis. Allegedly, a contributing factor was that many of the affected soldiers did not use the officially provided insect repellent because of its disturbing odor. Nearly 13,000 cases of the disease were recorded in all of Colombia throughout 2004, and about 360 new instances of the disease among soldiers had been reported in February 2005.

The disease is found across much of Asia and in the Middle East. Within Afghanistan, leishmaniasis occurs commonly in Kabul, partly due to bad sanitation and waste left uncollected in streets, allowing parasite-spreading sand flies an environment they find favorable. In Kabul, the number of people infected was estimated to be at least 200,000, and in three other towns (Herat, Kandahar, and Mazar-i-Sharif) about 70,000 more occurred, according to WHO figures from 2002. Kabul is estimated as the largest center of cutaneous leishmaniasis in the world, with around 67,500 cases as of 2004. Africa, in particular, the East and North, is also home to cases of leishmaniasis. Leishmaniasis is considered endemic also in some parts of southern parts of western Europe and has spread towards the north in recent years. For example, an outbreak of cutaneous and visceral leishmaniasis was reported from Madrid, Spain, between 2010 and 2012.

Leishmaniasis is mostly a disease of the developing world and is rarely known in the developed world outside a small number of cases, mostly in instances where troops are stationed away from their home countries. Leishmaniasis has been reported by U.S. troops stationed in Saudi Arabia and Iraq since the Gulf War of 1990, including visceral leishmaniasis. In September 2005, the disease was contracted by at least four Dutch marines who were stationed in Mazar-i-Sharif, Afghanistan, and subsequently repatriated for treatment.

== History ==
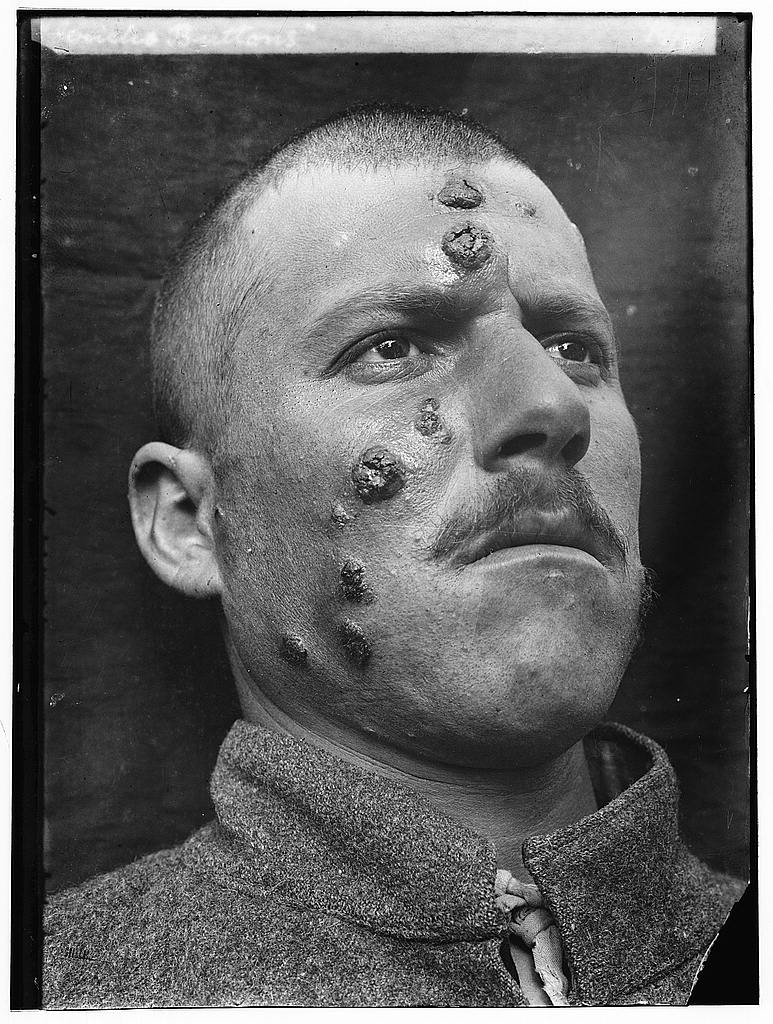
A 1917 case of cutaneous leishmaniasis in the Middle East, known then locally as "Jericho buttons" for the frequency of cases near the ancient city of Jericho

Descriptions of conspicuous lesions similar to cutaneous leishmaniasis appear on tablets from King Ashurbanipal from the seventh century BCE, some of which may have derived from even earlier texts from 1500 to 2500 BCE. Persian physicians, including Avicenna in the 10th century CE, gave detailed descriptions of what was called balkh sore. In 1756, Alexander Russell, after examining a Turkish patient, gave one of the most detailed clinical descriptions of the disease. Physicians in the Indian subcontinent would describe it as kala-azar (pronounced kālā āzār, the Urdu, Hindi, and Hindustani phrase for "black fever", kālā meaning black and āzār meaning fever or disease). In the Americas, evidence of the cutaneous form of the disease in Ecuador and Peru appears in pre-Inca pottery depicting skin lesions and deformed faces dating back to the first century CE. Some 15th- and 16th-century texts from the Inca period and from Spanish colonials mention "valley sickness", "Andean sickness", or "white leprosy", which are likely to be the cutaneous form.

It remains unclear who first discovered the organism. David Douglas Cunningham, Surgeon Major of the British Indian army, may have seen it in 1885 without being able to relate it to the disease. Peter Borovsky, a Russian military surgeon working in Tashkent, conducted research into the etiology of "oriental sore", locally known as sart sore, and in 1898 published the first accurate description of the causative agent, correctly described the parasite's relation to host tissues and correctly referred it to the protozoa. However, because his results were published in Russian in a journal with low circulation, his results were not internationally acknowledged during his lifetime. In 1901, William Boog Leishman identified certain organisms in smears taken from the spleen of a patient who had died from "dum-dum fever" (Dum Dum is an area close to Calcutta) and proposed them to be trypanosomes, found for the first time in India. A few months later, Captain Charles Donovan (1863–1951) confirmed the finding of what became known as Leishman-Donovan bodies in smears taken from people in Madras in southern India. But it was Ronald Ross who proposed that Leishman-Donovan bodies were the intracellular stages of a new parasite, which he named Leishmania donovani. The link with the disease kala-azar was first suggested by Charles Donovan, and was conclusively demonstrated by Charles Bentley's discovery of L. donovani in patients with kala-azar. Transmission by the sandfly was hypothesized by Lionel Napier and Ernest Struthers at the School of Tropical Medicine at Calcutta and later proven by his colleagues. The disease became a major problem for Allied troops fighting in Sicily during the Second World War; research by Leonard Goodwin then showed pentostam was an effective treatment.

== Society and culture ==
- Stigma and Psychological Effects: The cutaneous and mucocutaneous forms of leishmaniasis can cause visible scarring and disfigurement, leading to social stigma, discrimination, and emotional distress. In some communities, individuals with visible scarring may face social challenges, including barriers to employment, social activities, education, and marriage, due to the stigma surrounding the disease. As awareness grows, mental health support and community education programs are recognized as important disease management aspects.
- Economic burden: The cost of diagnosis, treatment, and hospitalizations pose financial challenges, particularly in regions where access to free or subsidized treatment is limited. Patients may experience income loss due to illness, disability and long recovery time. In rural areas, leishmaniasis can impact livestock and working animals, contributing to economic challenges for agricultural and livestock-dependent communities.
- Cultural beliefs and traditional medicine: In some endemic areas, cultural beliefs regarding the cause of leishmaniasis, including supernatural or spiritual explanations, may influence healthcare-seeking behaviors, sometimes delaying access to medical treatment.

== Research ==
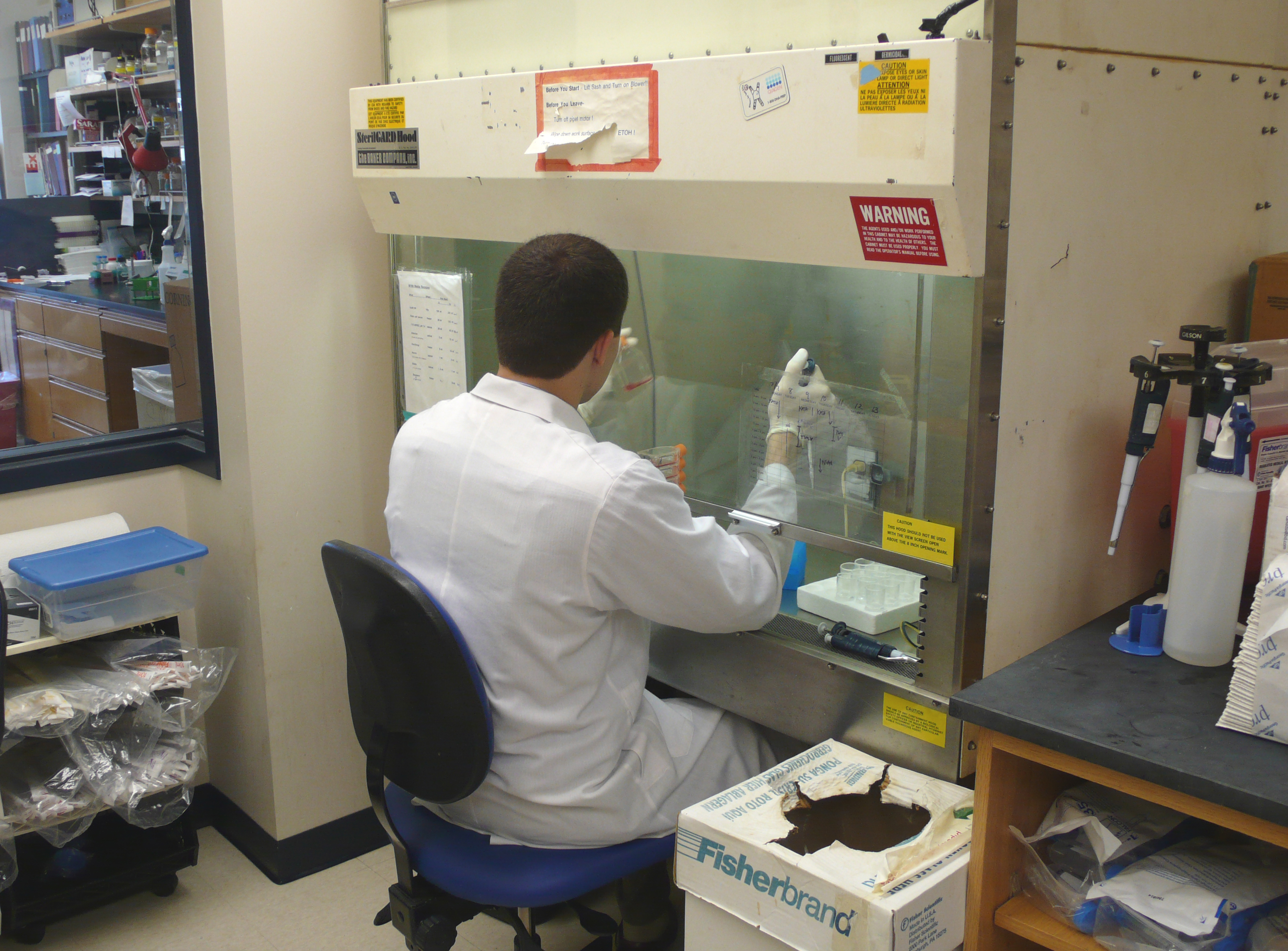
A parasitologist working on L. major in a biocontainment hood

As of 2017, no leishmaniasis vaccine for humans was available. Research to produce a human vaccine is ongoing.

Currently some effective leishmaniasis vaccines for dogs exist. There is also the consideration that public health practices can control or eliminate leishmaniasis without a vaccine. Pyrimidine–based drugs are being explored as anti-leishmanial compounds.

== See also ==
- Canine vector-borne disease
- Tropical disease
- Post-kala-azar dermal leishmaniasis
