= Post-kala-azar dermal leishmaniasis =

Complication of leishmaniasis

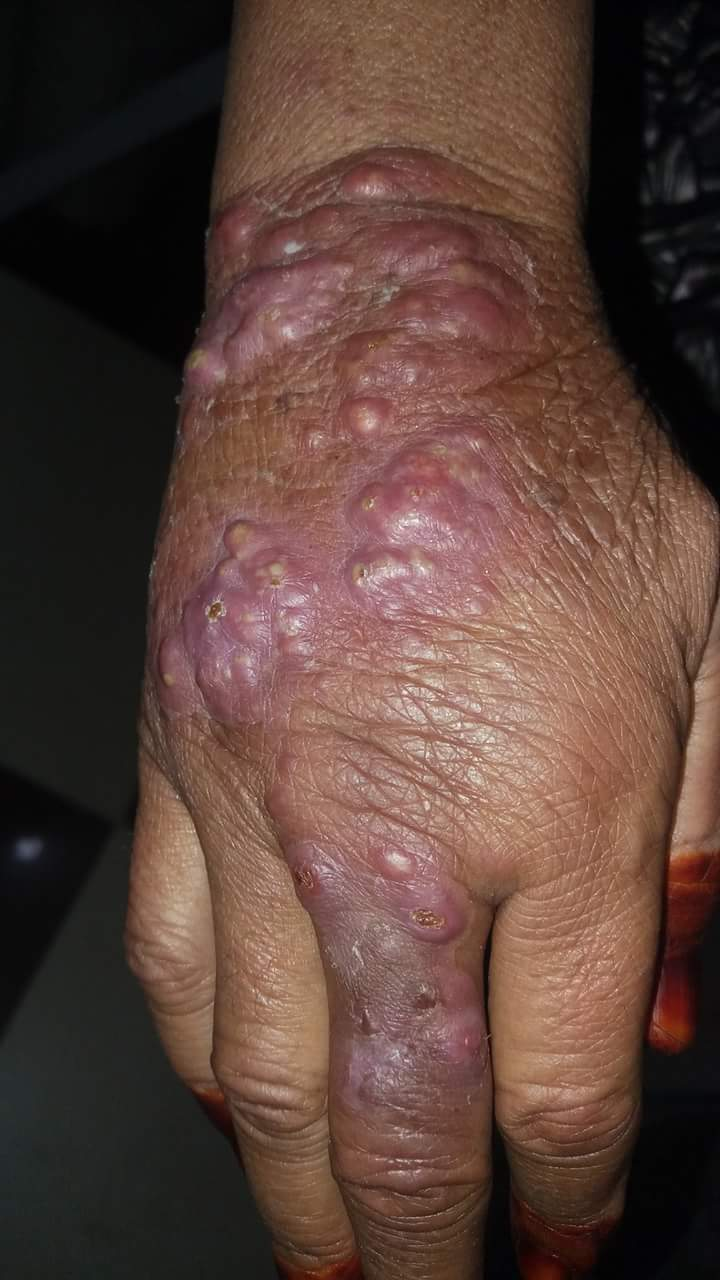
PKDL lesions on hand

Post-kala-azar dermal leishmaniasis (PKDL) is a complication of visceral leishmaniasis (VL); it is characterised by a macular, maculopapular, and nodular rash in a patient who has recovered from VL and who is otherwise well. The rash usually starts around the mouth from where it spreads to other parts of the body depending on severity.

Post-kala-azar dermal leishmaniasis (also known as "Post-kala-azar dermatosis") found mainly on the face, arms, and upper part of the trunk. It occurs years (in the Indian variation) or a few months (in the African strain) after the successful treatment of visceral leishmaniasis.

It is mainly seen in Sudan and India where it follows treated VL in 50% and 5–10% of cases, respectively. Thus, it is largely restricted to areas where Leishmania donovani is the causative parasite. The interval at which PKDL follows VL is 0–6 months in Sudan and 2–3 years in India. PKDL probably has an important role in interepidemic periods of VL, acting as a reservoir for parasites.

PKDL was first identified by Sir Upendranath Brahmachari, who initially called it dermal leishmanoid. He published his observations in the Indian Medical Gazette in 1922.

== Mechanism ==
The cause of PKDL is uncertain. Possibilities may include use of antimonial drugs, sunburn, reinfection with kala-azar, memory T cell responses failing in certain organs; and genetic susceptibility.

There is increasing evidence that the pathogenesis is largely immunologically mediated; high concentrations of interleukin 10 in the peripheral blood of VL patients predict the development of PKDL. During VL, interferon gamma is not produced by peripheral blood mononuclear cells (PBMC). After treatment of VL, PBMCs start producing interferon gamma, which coincides with the appearance of PKDL lesions due to interferon-gamma-producing cells causing skin inflammation as a reaction to persisting parasites in the skin.

== Diagnosis ==
PKDL is difficult to diagnose.

Diagnosis is mainly clinical, but parasites can be seen by microscopy in smears with limited sensitivity. PCR and monoclonal antibodies may detect parasites in more than 80% of cases. Serological tests and the leishmanin skin test are of limited value.

== Treatment ==
Treatment is always needed in Indian PKDL; in Sudan, most cases are self-limited but severe and chronic cases are treated. Sodium stibogluconate is given at 20 mg/kg for 2 months in Sudan and for 4 months in India. Liposomal amphotericine B seems effective. Although research has brought many new insights in pathogenesis and management of PKDL, several issues in particular in relation to control remain unsolved and deserve urgent attention.

Miltefosine is the only available oral medication available for VL and PKDL. While the drug works for short-term treatment of VL, PKDL would require a longer treatment of at least 28 days with this drug. Miltefosine is not recommended for use as a monotherapy to treat PKDL.

In July 2026, the World Health Organization recommended miltefosine in combination with either paromomycin or liposomal amphotericin B for the treatment of PKDL in Eastern Africa, and liposomal amphotericin B in monotherapy or in combination with short-course miltefosine in South Asia.

The risk of human immunodeficiency virus (HIV) co-infection in patients with visceral leishmaniasis (VL) or kala-azar in endemic areas has posed a major challenge in control.

== Society and culture ==
People with PKDL are a reservoir of leishmaniasis. To eliminate leishmaniasis from a population, people with PKDL must get treatment.

The government of India has an kala-azar elimination program ongoing which entered a consolidation phase in 2017.

== See also ==
- List of cutaneous conditions
