= Jean Dow =

Canadian medical missionary (1870–1927)

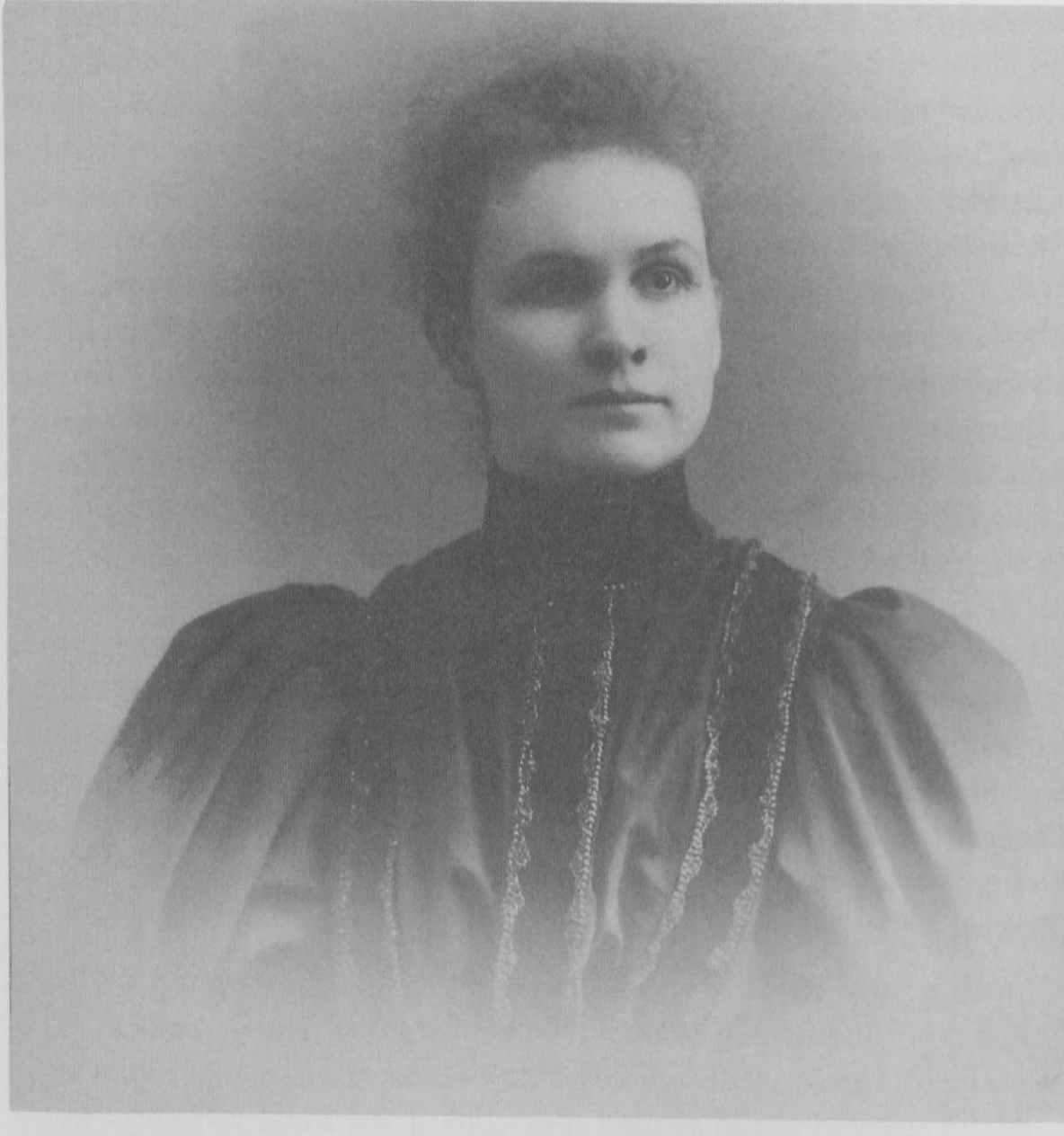
- Jean Dow, 1895
- Born: 25 June 1870; Fergus, Ontario, Canada
- Died: 16 January 1927 (aged 56)
- Education: University of Toronto
- Occupation: Physician Medical Missionary Infectious Disease Researcher

Jean Isabelle Dow (25 June 1870 – 16 January 1927) was a physician and a Canadian medical missionary. She was regarded as a pioneer in women's health care for her work as a member of, and one of the only women in, the Canadian Presbyterian Church Mission in the Honan (currently referred to as Henan) province of China. She played an important role in treating visceral leishmaniasis (kala azar) disease and in creating female specific hospitals where women could be treated as first-class citizens.

== Early life and education ==
Dow was born in the town of Fergus in Ontario, Canada. She was the fifth of eight children. Her father, Peter Dow (married to Agnes Wilson), was the superintendent of his own school, named the Dow's School. The family was progressive and valued education. They were members of the Melville Presbyterian Church in Fergus.

Dow graduated from high school at the age of thirteen and went on to study at the Model School in Mount Forest to become a teacher. From 1885 to 1891, Dow taught at her father's school in Fergus. In 1891, no longer wanting to be a teacher, Dow enrolled in the Toronto Medical College for Women where she studied medicine. In 1895, she graduated from college as a licensed physician.

== Career and research ==
=== Introduction to missionary service ===
Not wanting to practice medicine in Canada, Dow chose to take her medical skills to the Canadian Presbyterian Church Mission in the Honan province of China, otherwise referred to as the North Honan Mission.

Growing up, Dow and her family were members of the Melville Presbyterian Church in Fergus. Melville Presbyterian Church was a mission-oriented institution. It was there that Dow was first exposed to missionaries and realized a potential interest in pursuing foreign mission work. In 1891, Dow joined the Presbyterian Women's Foreign Missionary Society which recruited women to engage in missionary service abroad. Notably, Dow critically thought about the impact of her missionary work. In a 1903 letter to her co-worker Margaret Griffith, who worked alongside her in the North Honan Mission, Dow reflected on the motivations of medical missionaries working abroad, observing that some of their work was motivated by the “most subtle of all kinds of selfishness – religious selfishness – which seeks happiness, not helpfulness, as the goal."

=== Missionary experience in the North Honan Province of China ===
For thirty years, from 1895 to her death in 1927, Dow served as a surgeon and as a member of the North Honan Mission. The North Honan Mission was a Presbyterian mission founded by Jonathan and Rosalind Goforth in 1888. The North Honan Mission had difficulty getting started due to distrust of foreigners. In 1895, immediately after her graduation from the University of Toronto's Trinity College, Dow was appointed by the Presbyterian Women's Foreign Missionary Society to join the North Honan Mission as a medical missionary. She arrived at the mission on September 30, 1895, to take the place of the late Lucinda Graham, who had died of cholera. In the North Honan Mission, Dow maintained a varied medical practice treating everything from cataracts and wolf bites to more complicated obstetric issues. Notably, due to cultural traditions, Dow was only allowed to see female patients. Dow learned Chinese and was soon able to converse in it fluently with her female patients. “Oh, what an amount of work needs to be done before this North Honan is won for Christ!" Dow wrote in a letter to her friend Margaret Griffith in 1903.

=== Building gender-separated hospitals ===
In 1887, Dow established the first women's hospital. She argued for gender separation in medical hospitals so that women's medical care could take first priority. Her “chapel-dispensary” treated 400 patients within its first month. She opened similar operations in 1904 and 1913 by repurposing vacated male hospital buildings for her female patients. While some experts argued that creating gender specific wards led to worse medical facilities for both men and women, others, such as Dow, disagreed. Dow was adamant about treating women and men in separate facilities believing it improved the medical care for women. In a 1908 speech, Dow described one of her women's hospital as follows:

"It is very humble in appearance, a row of native buildings. Work goes on native principles, that is, that women provide their own bedding, friends to wait on them, food, etc., latterly a small fee has been charged to prevent those coming from curiosity.

"There are just three small rooms for wards each holding two or three patients at a time, with the dispensary and chapel. It may be in the near future greater demands may be made in the way of developments, more modern appliances and methods of work involving greater expenditure. There are many points of equipment still lacking; but we have great opportunities for service. No field gives a great area of the young women who is ambitious for a life of service. Our patients come from great distances, even 100 miles off…

Today the hospital stands in a unique position and while first of all evangelistic, its outlook and aim is also educational.”

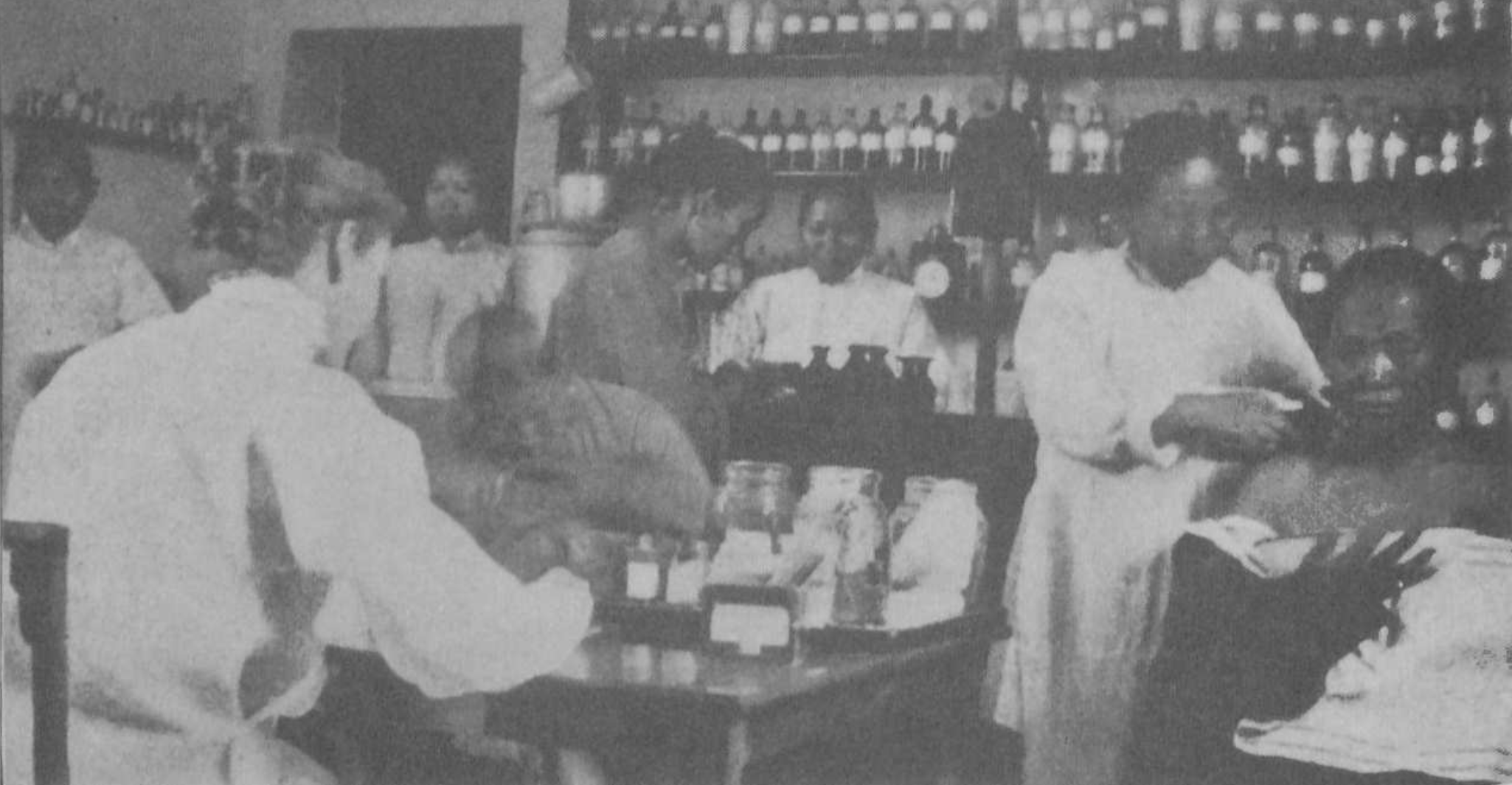
Jean Dow, her co-worker Margaret R. Griffith, and her Chinese staff working in Dow's medical clinic in North Henan, China.

=== Contributions to visceral leishmaniasis disease research ===
One of Dow's greatest accomplishments during her missionary career was her contributions, via clinical studies, to visceral leishmaniasis disease research. She, along with William McClure, are credited with finding the cure for the disease in China. Largely unrecognized for her contributions, Margaret Griffith is one of the few to give Dow credit for her research:

Dr. Dow was among the first to isolate the microscopic organism which causes the disease, and in subsequent years the Women’s Hospital entered upon a new actively as methods of treating this scourge were introduced, necessitating repeated and prolonged courses of extravenous injections.”

Ernest Struthers, a medical missionary who joined the North Henon Mission in 1912, describes one of Dow's cases in the fall of 1926 where she saved a boy with visceral leishmaniasis disease. Dr. Struthers noted that Dow's approach was risky, but she had the “courage… to tackle what most would not attempt.” Unlike Struthers, Dow did not publish any of her research on visceral leishmaniasis. Rather, she prioritized her clinical work. She viewed her clinical work as her way of serving God.

=== Contributions to serving victims of the North China Famine (1920–1921) ===
Dow received recognition from the Chinese government for her work during the Famine of 1920-21 and was credited for saving over 400 mothers and children.

=== Religion and education remained important to Dow throughout her mission work ===
Evangelical work was central to Dow's life. In a pamphlet that Margaret Griffith wrote about Dow's missionary work, entitled a Beloved Physician, she noted that “[m]edicine was [Dow’s] profession, Evangelism was her passion.” Dow, along with her assistants, used to take off time from their practice to preach and teach the word of God in neighboring areas. Religion was incorporated into Dow's medical missionary work, and in fact, medicine was, in some ways, a vehicle through which she was able to evangelize others.

Several times during her tenure in the North Honan Mission, Dow took furloughs in order to deliver speeches in churches about her missionary work or to enroll in post graduate courses to study the latest advancements in tropical medicine. In 1901, in the wake of the Boxer Rebellion, Dow left Honan China to study Tropical Medicine at the New York University School of Medicine. In 1909, Dow took another furlough to continue her tropical medicine studies at the London School of Hygiene and Tropical Medicine. She was one of two women in her graduating class. Lastly, in 1925, she became a fellow in Obstetrics at New York Presbyterian Hospital.

== Death and legacy ==
Dow died in China on January 16, 1927, at the age of 56, after a short unknown illness. She never married and had no children.

Despite Dow's success in the medical field, her commitment to science is rarely acknowledged. Rather, she is more often remembered for her religious devotion and her appearance. Even the secretary of the Church's Foreign Mission Committee, R.P. Mackay, who spoke at Dow's funeral, did not mention her contributions to the medical field, but spoke about her physical beauty and her outstanding Christian character:

"To begin with Dr. Dow was favoured in personal appearance. Whilst that is not an essential quality, yet a winsome face and graceful manner lie very near to the essentials. Dr. Dow was so endowed… Yet with all this attainment and assured appreciation, she could scarcely be induced to speak of her own work. When home on furlough she had a great story to tell, but could not be induced to tell it. She could speak but her words were always impersonal. The … “I” was ever lacking."

For twenty years, Dow was the only female physician and surgeon practicing in North Honan. She was one of the first women to be admitted onto the North Honan Mission's executive committee. She argued for gender separation in medical hospitals so that women's medical care could be a first priority and so that they would obtain quality medical care – a pressing issue during the 1920s. She was a pioneer in regards to providing health care to women in North Honan, China and one of the first professionals to successfully isolate in China and treat the microorganism carrying the visceral leishmaniasis disease.
