= Direct agglutination test =

- Purpose: test that uses whole organisms to find serum antibodies.

A direct agglutination test (DAT) is any test that uses whole organisms as a means of looking for serum antibodies. The abbreviation, DAT, is most frequently used for the serological test for visceral leishmaniasis.
