= Lionel Everard Napier =

British physician (1888–1957)

L. Everard Napier CIE FRCP (9 October 1888, Preston, Lancashire – 15 December 1957, Silchester, Hampshire) was a British tropical physician and professor of tropical medicine, known for his 1946 textbook Principles and Practice of Tropical Medicine and his 1923 book, coauthored by Ernest Muir, Kala Azar: A Handbook for Students and Practitioners.

Napier graduated from St John's School, Leatherhead and then studied medicine at St Bartholomew's Hospital, qualifying M.R.C.S. and L.R.C.P. in 1914. From 1915 to 1918 he served in the R.A.M.C. He served in the Mediterranean and in Egypt, in hospital ships and troop transports, and then in Mesopotamia, where he succeeded Hugh W. Acton as pathologist. During WWI Napier also served in Bombay, where he succeeded Robert Knowles as pathologist, and then returned to England in 1919. Acton and Knowles became professors at the newly formed School of Tropical of Medicine at Calcutta and persuaded Knowles to join the staff as a pathologist and special research worker in kala-azar. Ernest Struthers and Napier advanced the hypothesis that the sand-fly transmitted kala-azar. He remained at Calcutta's School of Tropical Medicine for 22 years, becoming in 1935 a professor of tropical medicine (as successor to Ernest Muir) and later the School's director. In 1943 Napier left India.

Kala-azar was his main sphere of work for fifteen years, and his reputation became world wide, for he made important contributions to knowledge of epidemiology, ætiology, transmission, diagnosis, treatment and in fact to every branch of the subject. He was early convinced that the sand-fly was the vector, and strove to prove this experimentally. He never succeeded, for knowledge of the bionomics of the sand-fly was inadequate. It was, however, a fitting crown to his work that shortly before he left India, the scientific proof was completed by men who had been his co-workers.

For the Indian Medical Gazette he served as assistant editor for five years and editor for ten years. In 1943 he went to New York City's Columbia University as a visiting professor and while there completed his 1946 textbook Principles and Practice of Tropical Medicine. After his return to England in 1946, he became editor of the Journal of Tropical Medicine and Hygiene.

Soon after Napier returned to England he was appointed specialist in tropical diseases to the Ministry of Pensions and consultant to Queen Mary's Hospital, Roehampton. In 1951 he became medical editor of Caxton Publishing Company, and was engaged in preparing the British Medical Dictionary.

== Awards and honours ==
- 1940 — Fellow of the Royal College of Physicians
- 1942 — Companion of the Order of the Indian Empire

== See also ==
- Plasmodium knowlesi#History of discovery
