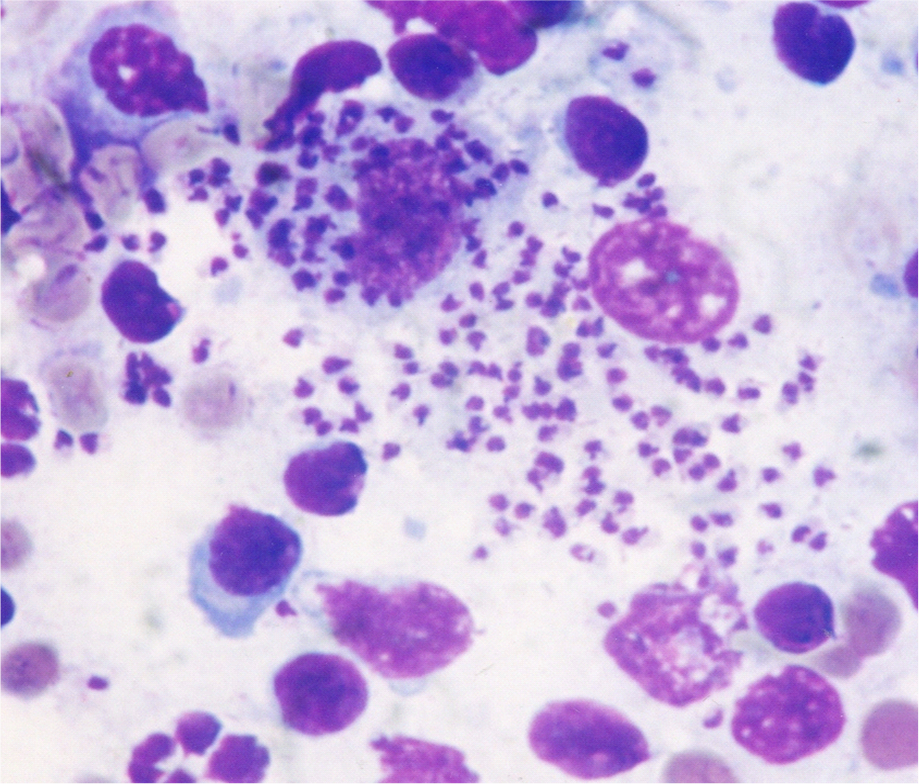
- Several Leishmania infantum amastigotes in a bone marrow smear from a naturally infected dog

Scientific classification
- Domain: Eukaryota
- (unranked): incertae sedis
- Clade: Discoba
- Phylum: Euglenozoa
- Class: Kinetoplastea
- Order: Trypanosomatida
- Family: Trypanosomatidae
- Genus: Leishmania
- Species: L. infantum

Binomial name
- Leishmania infantum Nicolle, 1908

Synonyms
- Leishmania chagasi

= Leishmania infantum =

Species of parasitic protist

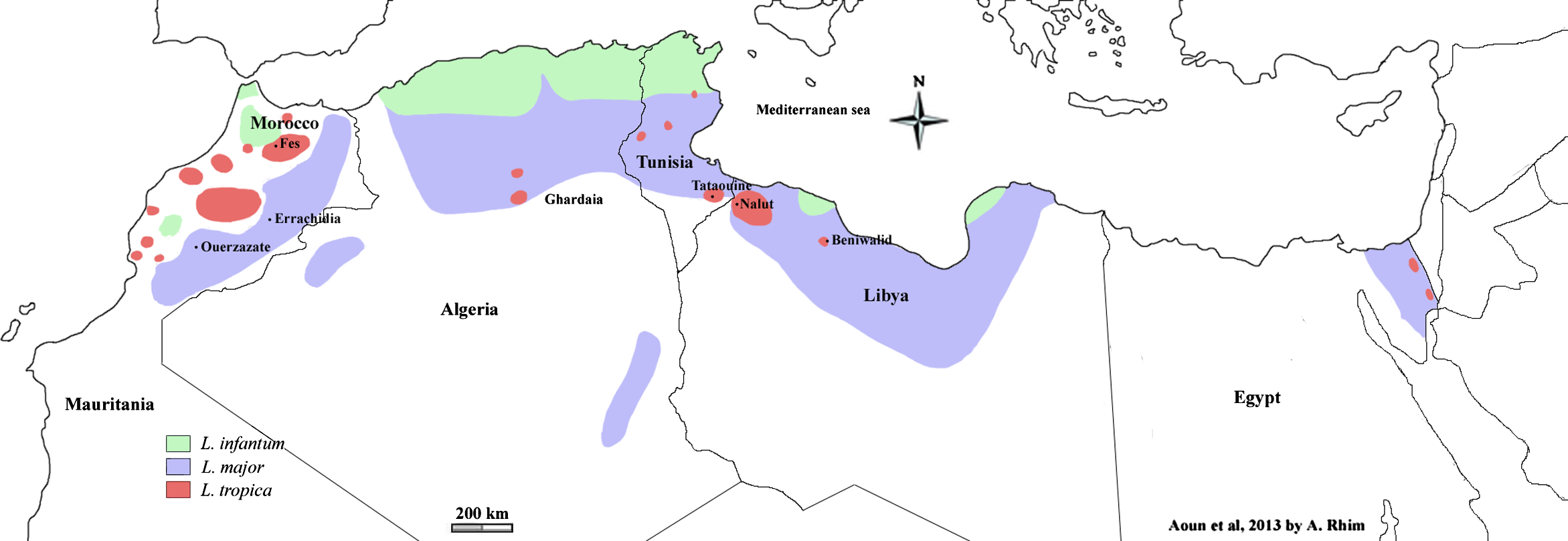
Cutaneous leishmaniasis in North Africa; Leishmania infantum infected areas are in green

Leishmania infantum is a parasitic protozoan and the causative agent of infantile visceral leishmaniasis in the Mediterranean region and in Latin America, where it has been called Leishmania chagasi. It is also an unusual cause of cutaneous leishmaniasis, which is normally caused by specific lineages (or zymodemes). Wild canids and domestic dogs are the natural reservoir of this organism. The sandfly species Lutzomyia longipalpis serves as the primary vector for the transmission of the disease.

Leishmania infantum is closely related to Leishmania donovani, and some authors believe that these two species are so close as to actually be subspecies of each other; however, phylogenetic analyses can easily distinguish between the two groups despite no difference in morphology in the species complex. Some isolates formerly labelled L. donovani may be actually L. infantum.

== Model system for studies of DNA repair ==
Comparative bioinformatic analyses showed that the size of the L. infantum BRCA2 protein is approximately three times smaller (125 kD) than its human counterpart. Furthermore, analyses revealed that LiBRCA2 possesses key features of the BRCA2 family. The smaller size of the Leishmania BRCA2 DNA repair protein has been exploited to better understand its function in homologous recombination and its interaction with the LiRAD51 recombinase.

== Reservoir hosts ==
L. infantum is spread by Phlebotomus sand fly vectors and is able to infect numerous domestic and wild mammals. The most notable targets of this disease, zoonotic visceral leishmaniasis, are canines in southern Europe. Infections in wildlife tend to be uncommon. To further the understanding of possible hosts in Europe, xenodiagnosis has shown that hares (Lepus granatensis), rabbits (Oryctolagus cuniculus), black rats (Rattus rattus), and the American crab-eating fox (Cerdocyon thous) are all able to transmit the disease to vectors. There is also evidence that red foxes (Vulpes vulpes) and other canids may contribute to transmission. There are still potential hosts in Europe whose roles are still unclear, including felines, mustelids, insectivores, chiroptera, and various rodent species.
