= Ernest Black Struthers =

Canadian physician, researcher, educator and medical missionary (1886–1977)

- Born: April 28, 1886; Galt, Ontario, Canada
- Died: May 22, 1977 (aged 91)
- Burial place: Mount Pleasant Cemetery
- Education: University of Toronto
- Occupations: Doctor, Physician, Medical Missionary, Professor, Researcher, Dean, Consultant, Author

Ernest Black Struthers (April 28, 1886 – May 22, 1977) was a Canadian physician, researcher, educator and medical missionary who worked in the Far East. Specifically, he accomplished most of his work in the Alice Memorial Hospital in Hong Kong, Cheeloo University in Jinan, China, and Severance Union Medical College in Seoul, Korea. Additionally, he is known for his contributions to the treatment of kala-azar, including his published chapter in Cecil's Textbook of Medicine. He is described as a remarkable man, and a kind, outgoing, and endearing intellectual.

== Early life and education ==
Ernest Black Struthers was born in Ontario, Canada to Mary Kerr and Robert G. Struthers. Specifically, he was born on Rose Street in the town of Galt. Although the Ontario Register states that he was born on May 28, 1886, his birthday was recorded as April 28, 1886, in his family's Bible. He was given the middle name Black after his great-grandfather Robert Black. His father owned a hardware store, and they were a religious family. Struthers was exposed to missionaries at a young age, since his family would often host them at their home. Robert Gordon Struthers, also a medical missionary, was his younger brother by two years. During his first year in college, Ernest Struthers decided to live his life in accordance with the principles of Christianity. Struthers obtained a B.A in 1910 from the University of Toronto and a M.B (Bachelor of Medicine) in June 1912. After graduating, Struthers made prints for his father's business, "The Galt Electric and Gas Fixture Company," and decided to go to England in 1912,

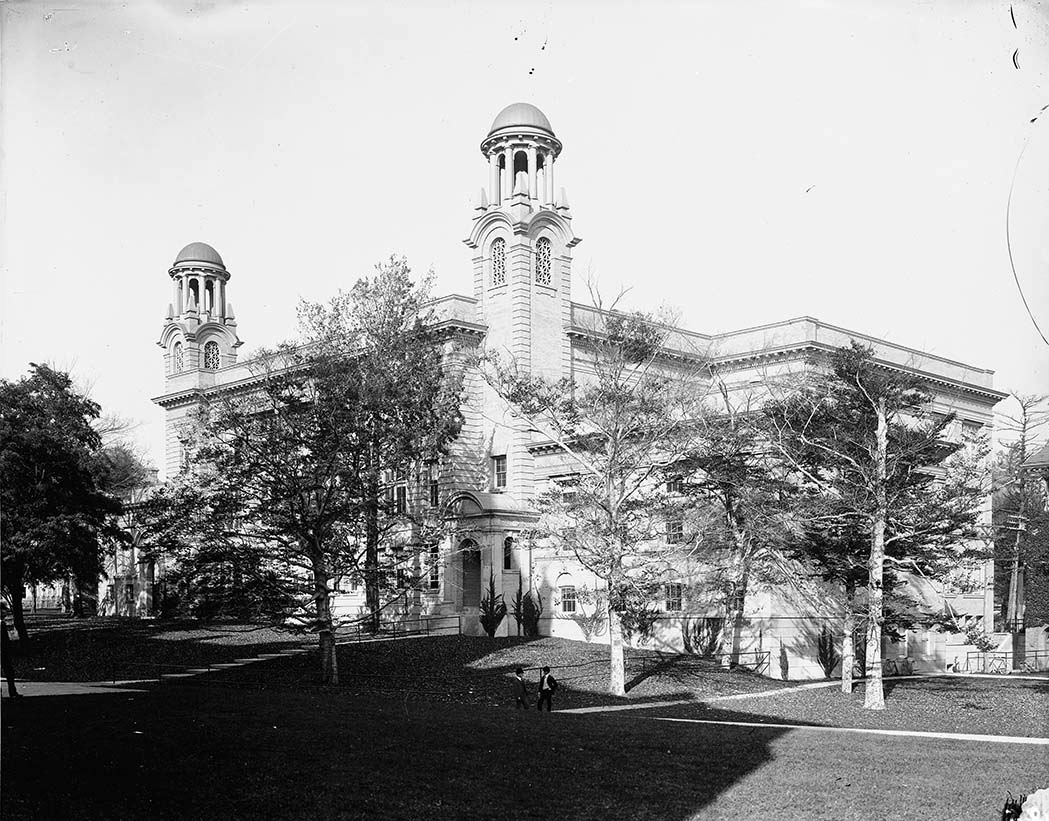
University of Toronto Medical Building, university that Ernest Black Struthers received his M.B. from in 1912

== Personal life ==
Struthers became engaged to Margaret Walks on October 5, 1915, and they married on May 10, 1916. Their first child, Gilchrist Struthers, was born on April 11, 1917, and their second child, David Struthers, was born February 22, 1922. Mary Struthers, their third child, was born June 6, 1926. Margaret died December 3, 1948. Struthers married Elda Daniels on July 20, 1957 in England. Altogether, he had 12 grandchildren.

== Missionary work ==
=== Work in Hong Kong ===
In England in 1912, Struthers was accepted into the China Customs Service in Fuzhou. However family friends who he was staying with in London, the Merrys, disapproved of this because the China Customs Service was not "missionary" work. Ultimately, he changed his plans and traveled to Hong Kong under the London Missionary Society to replace Dr. Mitchell, due to Mitchell's illness, for a year and a half. Struthers arrived in Hong Kong February 20, 1913, and began working at the Alice Memorial Hospital. He lived with H.R. Wells. Along with a Dr Gibson, performed many unique operations, including a man with the congenital deformity of harelip and a boy with a tapering stone. He was responsible for the post-operative care and the eye ward. In September 1913, while still working at the Alice Memorial Hospital, Struthers also became the Warden of Morrison Hall, which was a hostel at the University of Hong Kong sponsored by the London Missionary Society. He oversaw students' activities and was responsible for the accounts. After his 18 month appointment in Hong Kong had ended, Struthers decided to leave for home and join the Canadian Presbyterian Board in September 1914 due to his lack of knowledge of Cantonese. However, in Welhei, he was convinced to stay and learn the language, and by 1915, he was working at the Henan province as part of a Canadian mission.

=== Work in the First World War ===
In 1916, Struthers received a message from the British Minister in Peking to the Presbyterian Mission asking for missionaries who knew the Chinese language to serve in France. Struthers volunteered and was a captain in the Royal Army Medical Corps. He arrived in Noyelles-sur-mer, France, in July and started by running a gonorrhea and syphilis ward, helping at a hut with patients in serious condition, and monitoring the sanitation of a hospital. He also ran a hospital for the Chinese Labor Corps, and he worked in the Noyelles-sur-Mer hospital's convalescent camp in the Crecy Forest as part of the Canada Army Medical Corps. In the summer of 1918, he worked 24 hours days at a shelter in Seignville.

After the war, he completed five weeks of postgraduate study in New York.

=== Work in China ===
In February 1919, Struthers returned to China and became a physician at the Cheeloo University in Jinan, which was known as the Shantung Christian Union Medical College. It was considered the highest school of learning by 15 mission boards. In addition to practicing medicine, he taught pharmacology, therapeutics, tropical medicine, and internal medicine. In the summer of 1924, he went on furlough and did deputation work in Canada. He also spent six weeks doing clinical experience with Dr. Peabody at the Boston City Hospital.

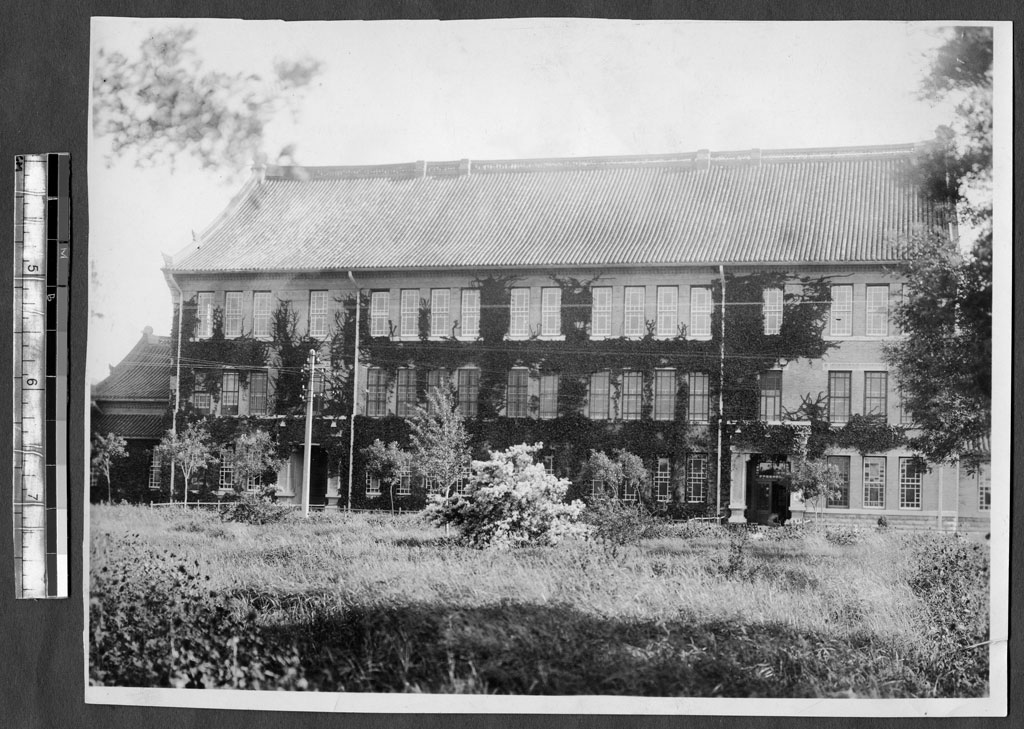
Bergen Hall Chemistry Building of Cheeloo University 1924, where Struthers was the Dean 1942–1948

At Cheeloo University, Struthers was appointed as a representative of the Canadian Presbyterians. In 1928, fighting occurred between the Chinese Nationalist troops and the Japanese in the Shandong province before the Nationalists gained control a year later. During this time, Struthers reported on the terrors that occurred, specifically at the Chinese military hospital. Life was dangerous and fearful during this time. Along with William McClure and George M. Ross, Struthers sent a cable to Dr. A. E. Armstrong, of the United Church Foreign Missionary Board, on May 7, 1928, stating "Expect aid. All well." During his second furlough, Struthers studied in Calcutta at the School of Tropical Medicine and travelled to 39 cities. In 1930, he became the Associate Professor of Medicine, and from 1934-1950, Struthers was the Professor of Medicine.

From October 1935 to 1936, Struthers initiated a successful program for about 20,000 flood refugees of the Yellow River. This program included vaccination for smallpox, supply of vitamins, and preventative measures of infectious diseases. These measures included supply of clean baths and solutions to anesthetize lice which spread diseases.

Struthers was also the Dean of the Faculty of Medicine of the Cheeloo University from 1942–1948. He took a leave of absence 1944–1945, and he gave the deanship to Hou Pao-chang during this time. During this leave, Struthers served as a Consultant on China to the Surgeon General in Washington, DC. He prepared descriptions of medical facilities, water supplies, and dangerous animals. After the Japanese left Cheeloo, Struthers was sent back to guard the hospitals from a Nationalist take over. He obtained support from General Oldum, who was the Canadian Ambassador in Chungking, the Governor of the Province, and the Minister of Education. Struthers worked hard to ensure no medical equipment was taken by the Nationalists, and he reopened the hospital. As Dean of Cheeloo, Struthers moved the medical school to Fuzhou in 1948 for a year due to a fear of a Communist attack, He left for Canada in 1950 after returning when Shanghai fell to the Communists.

=== Work in Korea ===
Shortly after returning to Toronto, Canada, during which he worked in tuberculosis surveillance, Struthers traveled to Korea in 1953. He became Professor of Internal Medicine and Tuberculosis at the Severance Union Medical College, Seoul, from 1953–1960. He established his first clinic there in 1954, and he believed that overcrowded housing and poor infrastructure were major issues causing a tuberculosis crisis. On December 22, 1956, New York financier John Hay Whitney gave Struthers $5,000 for his tuberculosis control project of the Korean Church Works service. Whitney told Struthers that this money was the first installment of $15,000 that he and his wife hoped to give to Struthers. Struthers believed about 6.5% of the population in Korea had tuberculosis. In Korea, he opened up a general hospital with a tuberculosis ward. He also was a consultant in tuberculosis to the Republic of Korea, Department of Health and Social Affairs, from 1961–1963.

== Advancements in Kala-azar ==
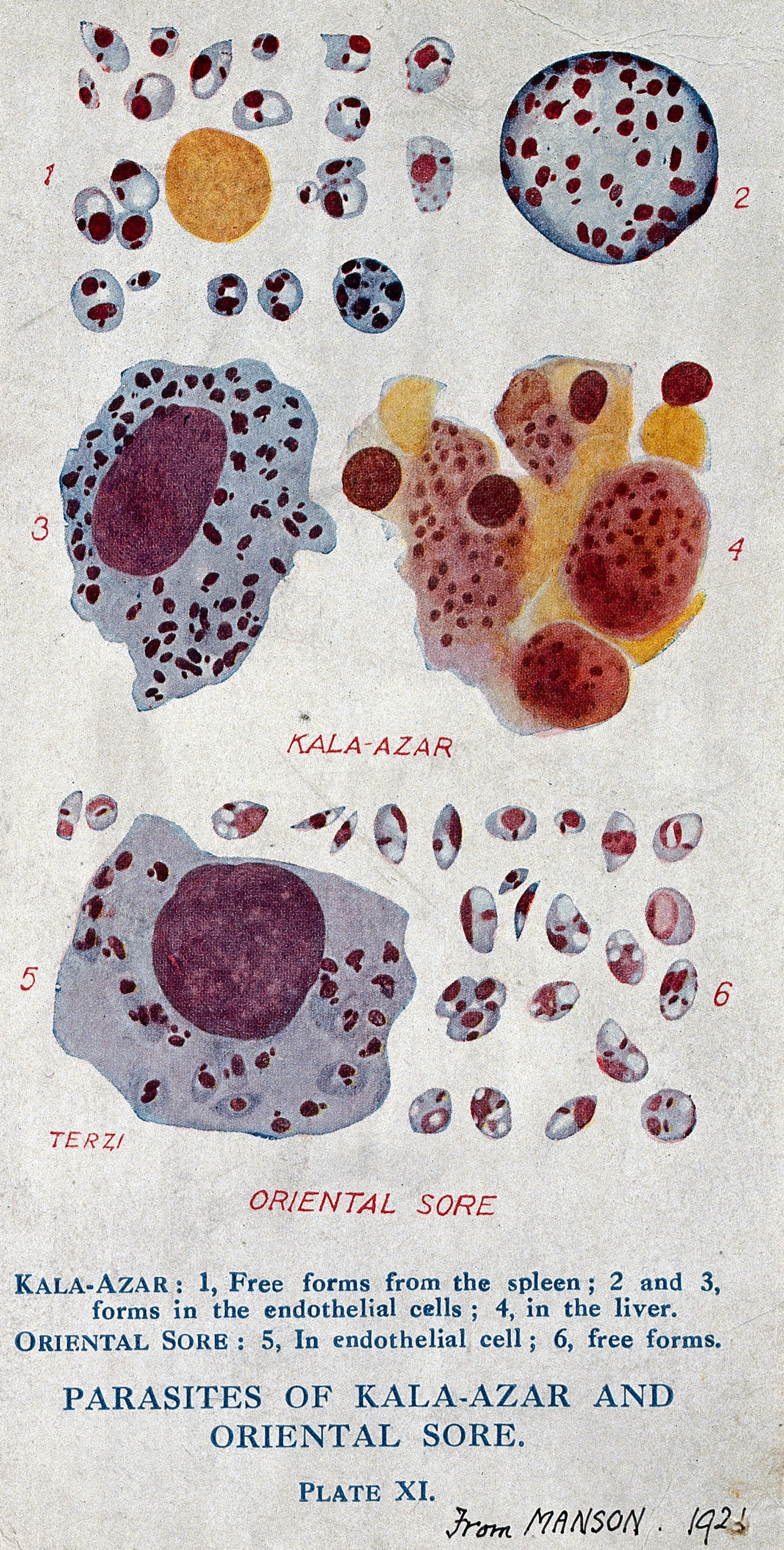
Parasites of kala-azar, a disease that Struthers made notable research contributions to

After receiving his diploma in tropical medicine and hygiene from the London School of Tropical Medicine in 1925, Struthers returned to the Cheeloo University and began to also study tropical and parasitic diseases. Specifically, Struthers became a leading researcher on kala-azar (leishmaniasis), a disease transmitted by sandflies which is caused by a parasite invading the blood-forming organs. Symptoms include an enlarged spleen, irregular fever, a dusky appearance, and anemia. In 1920, the mortality rate was 90% without treatment.

In 1924, Struthers published his first article on kala-azar in the China Missionary Medical Journal. He began working with Dr. Jean Isabelle Dow at the Cheeloo University there. They worked together until her death in 1927. In 1928, Dr. Russell LaFayette Cecil of the Cornell Medical School in New York asked him to author the chapter on Leishmaniasis for his Textbook on Medicine, a notable achievement. On his furlough in 1930, Struthers studied kala-azar at the School of Tropical Medicine in Calcutta. Struthers also worked with Dr. Lionel E. Napier and his colleagues at this school. In 1933 and 1934, they promoted the hypothesis that the sand fly was the transmission vector for the disease.

To diagnose patients, Struthers performed spleen punctures to confirm the presence of Leishman-Donovan bodies. He began treating patients with potassium antimony tartrate. Later, he used an organic preparation of antimony. Over time, about 80–95% of treated patients were cured, and the treatment time dramatically decreased from eight months to three weeks.

== Death ==
Struthers died on May 22, 1977, aged 91. He is buried at Mount Pleasant Cemetery in Toronto, Ontario.

== Publications ==
Struthers primarily published in the Chinese Medical Journal, and his most notable publication includes his chapter titled "The Leishmaniases" in Cecil's Textbook of Medicine.

- "The Leishmaniases" – Cecil's Textbook of Medicine, 1929
- "Kala-azar, Criterion of Care" – Chinese Medical Journal, 1924 (March)
- "The Globulin Precipitation Test and Formol Gel Test in the Diagnosis of Kala-azar", Chinese Medical Journal, March, 1924
- "Neostam – Stibamine Glucoside in the Treatment of Kala-azar", Chinese Medical Journal, January, 1927
- "The Treatment of Kala-azar by Stibosan (Hayden 471) and Anti-mosan (Hayden 661)", Chinese Medical Journal, September, 1927
- "Splenomegaly in the Diagnosis of Kala-azar", Chinese Medical Journal, August, 1929
- "Neostibosan in the Treatment of Kala-azar", Chinese Medical Journal, January, 1931
- "Antimony in the Treatment of Kala-azar and its Toxic Effects", Chinese Medical Journal, Vol. 47: 1421–33, 1933
- "The Treatment of Kala-azar with Solustibosan", Chinese Medical Journal, Vol. 52: 335–338, September, 1937
- "Nephritis with Edema Caused by Malignant Nephritis", Chinese Medical Journal, April, 1928
- "Report on Medical Relief for Flood Refugees", Chinese Medical Journal, Vol, 50: 1670, 1936
- "Acute Leukemia, Seven Cases", Chinese Medical Journal, Vol. 51: 471–478, 1937
- "Relation of Medical Schools to the Rural Health Program", Chinese Medical Journal, Vol. 52: 447, 1937
- "Tuberculosis in Korea – a Control Project", Journal American Medical Association, April 12, 1958
- "Tuberculosis Contacts in Seoul, Korea – an Analysis of 3002 Household Contacts", American Review of Respiratory Diseases, Vol. 83, June, 1961
- "Tuberculosis in Korea", Korea Calling, July 1962
- "Treating Tuberculosis in Korea", The Medical Graduate, Vol. 10 No. 2, 1963–1964
- U.S. Army War Department Technical Bulletin – Medical Sanitary Data on Southeastern China" – June 1945 – 94 pages, Washington, D.C. – produced with the assistance of Dr. A.R. Turner
