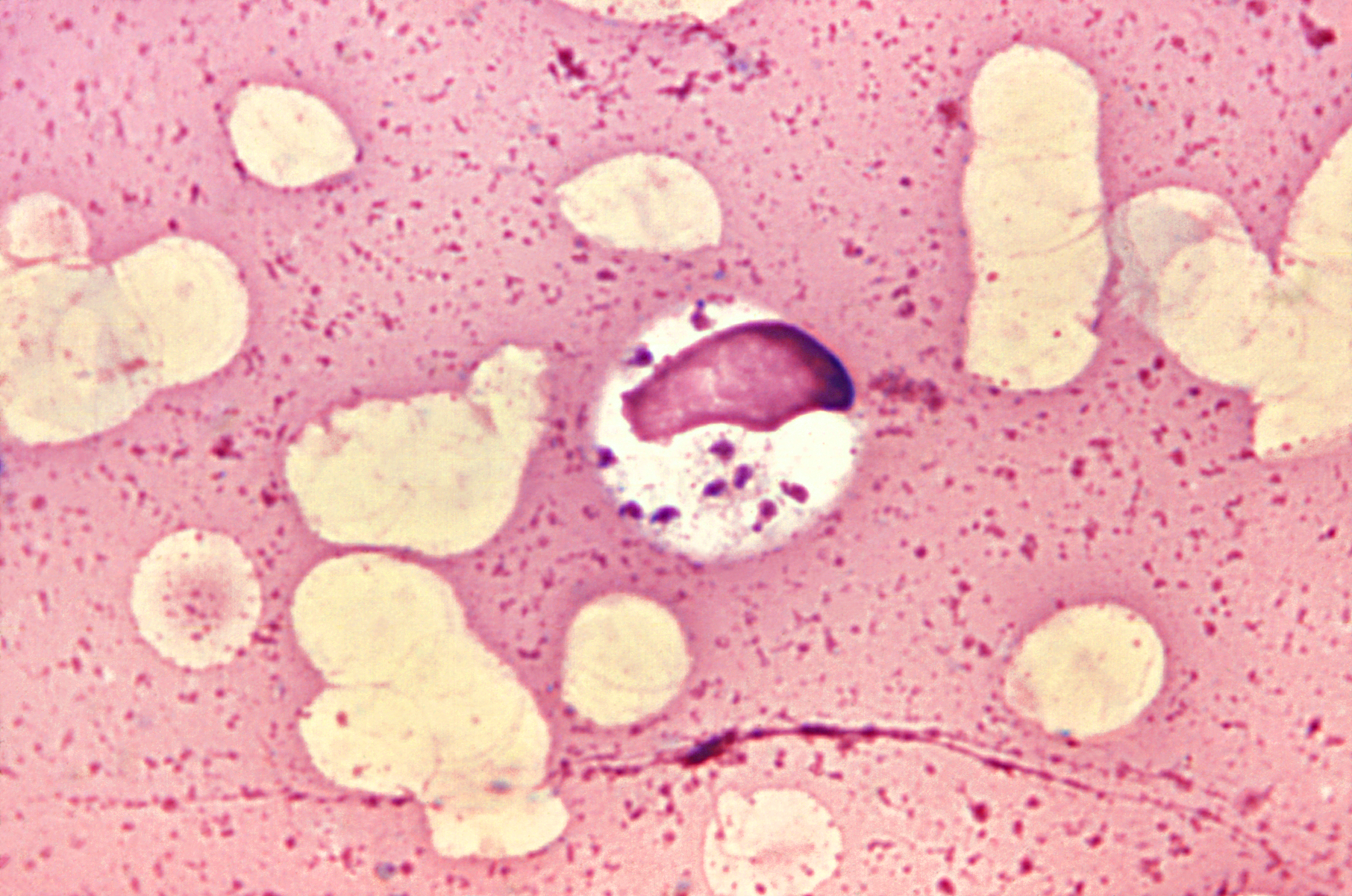
- Leishmania donovani in bone marrow cell

Scientific classification
- Domain: Eukaryota
- Supergroup: Discoba
- Phylum: Euglenozoa
- Class: Kinetoplastea
- Order: Trypanosomatida
- Family: Trypanosomatidae
- Genus: Leishmania
- Species: L. donovani

Binomial name
- Leishmania donovani (Laveran et Mesnil, 1903) Ross, 1903

Synonyms
- Leishmania archibaldi (invalid subgroup)

= Leishmania donovani =

Species of intracellular parasite

Leishmania donovani is a species of intracellular parasites belonging to the genus Leishmania, a group of haemoflagellate kinetoplastids that cause the disease leishmaniasis. It is a human blood parasite responsible for visceral leishmaniasis or kala-azar, the most severe form of leishmaniasis. Kala-azar (as it is commonly referred to) infects the mononuclear phagocyte system, including spleen, liver and bone marrow. Infection is transmitted by species of sandfly belonging to the genus Phlebotomus in Old World and Lutzomyia in New World. These sandfly species are prevalent throughout tropical and temperate regions including Africa (mostly in Sudan), China, India, Nepal, southern Europe, Russia and South America. The parasite spread by it is responsible for thousands of deaths every year, and the sandfly species which spreads it has been found in at least 88 countries, with 350 million people at constant risk of infection and 0.5 million new cases in a year.

L. donovani was independently discovered by two British medical officers William Boog Leishman in Netley, England, and Charles Donovan in Madras, India, in 1903. However, the correct taxonomy was provided by Ronald Ross. The parasite requires two different hosts for a complete life cycle, humans as the definitive host and sandflies as the intermediate host. In some parts of the world other mammals, especially canines, act as reservoir hosts. In human cell they exist as small, spherical and unflagellated amastigote form; while they are elongated with flagellum as promastigote form in sandflies. Unlike other parasitic protists they are unable to directly penetrate the host cell, and are dependent upon phagocytosis. The whole genome sequence of L. donovani obtained from southeastern Nepal was published in 2011.

L. donovani sensu stricto is in a species complex with the closely related L. infantum, which causes the same disease. The former is commonly found in East Africa and the Indian subcontinent, while the latter is found in Europe, North Africa, and Latin America. The split is done in 2007, and references to L. donovani often still refer to the entire complex (sensu lato). As of 2022, the parasite causes 50,000 to 90,000 infections worldwide.

== Discovery ==
One of the earliest known epidemics of L. donovani infection (kala-azar as it was called in Hindi) was known in India just after the Indian Rebellion of 1857. The first medical record was however only in 1870 by British medical officers from Assam. In 1900, an English soldier stationed at Dum Dum, West Bengal, died at the Army Medical School in Netley, England. The autopsy was performed by William Boog Leishman. He processed the tissue sample of the enlarged spleen using a staining technique (now known as Leishman's stain) which he had just developed, and discovered the protozoan parasites using microscopy. But he mistakenly considered the parasites to be degenerate trypanosomes, already known protozoan parasites in Africa and South America. In 1903, Leishman published his discovery as "On the possibility of the occurrence of trypanosomiasis in India" in the British Medical Journal, which appeared on 11 May.

Another British medical officer Charles Donovan, who was serving in the Indian Medical Service, had found the parasites in April of that year at the Government General Hospital in Madras. After reading Leishman paper, Donovan confirmed on 17 June that the parasites (by then known as "Leishman bodies") were definitely the causative agents of kala-azar. He wrote a commentary of his discovery in relation to that of Leishman in the same journal using the same title as that of Leishman's, that appeared on 11 July 1903.

Soon a controversy arose as to whom such a monumental discovery should be credited. Donovan sent some of his slides to Ronald Ross, who was at the time in Liverpool, and to Alphonse Laveran at the Pasteur Institute in Paris. Laveran and his colleague Félix Mesnil identified the protozoan (and yet wrongly) to be members of Piroplasmida, and gave the scientific name Piroplasma donovanii. It was Ross who resolved the conflict of priority in the discovery and correctly identified the species as member of the novel genus Leishmania. He gave the popular name "Leishman-Donovan bodies", and subsequently the valid binomial Leishmania donovani, thereby equally crediting the two rivals.

== Structure ==
Leishmania donovani is a unicellular eukaryote having a well-defined nucleus and other cell organelles including a kinetoplast and a flagellum. This species has n=36 chromosomes. Depending on its host it exists in two structural variants, as follows:

1. Amastigote form found in the mononuclear phagocyte and circulatory systems of humans. It is an intracellular and non-motile form, being devoid of external flagellum. The short flagellum is embedded in the anterior end without projecting out. It is oval in shape, and measures 3–6 μm in length and 1–3 μm in breadth. The kinetoplast and basal body lie towards the anterior end.
2. Promastigote is formed in the alimentary tract of the sandfly. It is an extracellular and motile form. It is considerably larger and more highly elongated, measuring 15–30 μm in length and 5 μm in width. It is spindle-shaped, tapering at both ends. A long flagellum (about the body length) is projected externally at the anterior end. The nucleus lies at the centre, and in front of which are kinetoplast and basal body.

== Infection and life cycle ==
Life cycle of Leishmania donovani

Leishmania donovani is a digenetic parasite passing its life cycle in two different hosts.

=== Definitive host ===
In humans the metacyclic promastigotes are injected by sandfly through the skin during its blood meal. When sandfly bites using its proboscis it ejects the parasites that are stored inside the hollow tube. Some promastigotes may enter the blood stream directly where some are destroyed by macrophagic cytolysis. But many are also taken up through phagocytosis by mononuclear phagocytes in liver, spleen and bone marrow. Inside the cells they undergo spontaneous transformation into oval-shaped amastigotes.

Granulocytes selectively kill the promastigotes by oxidative mechanism, while amastigotes are resistant. Then the surviving amastigotes undergo cell division using simple binary fission. Multiplication continues until the host cell can no longer hold and ruptures. In a fully congested cell there can be as many as 50 to 200 amastigotes, which are released into tissue cavities. Each individual amastigote is then capable of invading fresh cells. As a result, the entire tissue is progressively infected and destroyed. A number of free amastigotes then enters the blood stream where many are phagocytosed by macrophages. These free and phagocytosed amastigotes in peripheral blood are then sucked up by blood-feeding sandfly.

=== Intermediate host ===
L. donovani undergo further development only in the digestive tract of the female sandfly. Hence only females are responsible for transmitting the infection. Once the amastigotes are ingested, they enter the midgut of the sandfly. Then they undergo structural modification into flagellated promastigotes, becoming larger and considerably elongated. They get attached to the gut epithelial lining where they multiply rapidly by binary fission. (They are also capable of sexual reproduction by genetic hybridisation in the sandfly gut.) They then migrate back towards the anterior part of the digestive system such as pharynx and buccal cavity. This process is known as anterior station development, which is unique in Leishmania. A heavy infection of pharynx can be observed within 6 to 9 days after initial blood meal. The promastigotes become infective only by this time, and the event is called the metacyclic stage. The metacyclic promastigotes then enter the hollow proboscis where they accumulate and completely block the food passage. Immediately upon biting a human, the parasites are released, which invariably results in infection.

The stages of development in sandfly can be described as follows:

1. Soon after entering the gut, the amastigotes get coated with peritrophic matrix, which is composed of chitin and protein complex. This protects the parasites from the digestive enzymes of the host.
2. The amastigotes travel as far as the abdominal midgut and first transform into a weakly motile "procyclic promastigotes" on the gut wall within 1–3 days.
3. The young promastigotes secrete a neuropeptide that stop peristalsis of the gut. The surface lipophosphoglycan (LPG) of the promastigote serves as an attachment to the gut epithelium. These factors prevent the expulsion of promastigotes during excretion of the insect.
4. During 4–7 days the peritrophic matrix is degraded by the activity of chitinases. This release the more actively motile "nectomonad promastigotes" which migrate anteriorly until they reach the opening of the thoracic gut.
5. Another transformation takes place by which they turn into "leptomonad promastigotes". These are fully motile and capable of binary fission. Multiplication and migration towards thoracic midgut cause congestion of the pharynx and buccal cavity. Here they secrete promastigote secretory gel (PSG), which is composed of soluble acid phosphatase and phosphoglycoprotein.
6. After 6–9 days the promastigotes become metacyclic. Some are also transformed into non-replicating promastigotes, which also become metacyclic. The sandfly is able to regurgitate and eject the parasites from its proboscis with the help of PSG when it bites.

=== Reservoir host ===
Dogs are known to be susceptible to L. donovani infection. Especially in the New World, infection is a zoonotic disease, involving different canine species, including domestic dog and the two fox species, Lycalopex vetulus and Cerdocyon thous. In the Mediterranean region domestic dogs and the three fox species Vulpes vulpes, V. corsac and V. zerda are common reservoir hosts. In Africa and Brazil, some marsupials and rodents are also reported to harbour L. donovani.

== Epidemiology ==
It is estimated that visceral leishmaniasis (VL) affects more than 100 million people worldwide, with 1.5 to 2 million new cases and more than 70,000 deaths each year. As of the 2022 report, there were 50,000 to 90,000 infections worldwide in 2020, and the World Health Organization estimates that only between 25 and 45% of the cases were reported. Although L. donovani is only the second-most prevalent Leishmania causing VL, it is the most dangerous form and directly fatal to humans. Over 90% of reported cases are from India, Bangladesh, Nepal, Sudan and Brazil. In India, it is prevalent in the eastern region including Bihar, West Bengal, eastern Uttar Pradesh, Assam and foothills of Sikkim. It is responsible for tens of thousands of mortality among Africans in eastern and southern parts of Sudan. During the epidemic of 1984–1994 death toll was as high as 70% in the Sudanese population. Moreover, due to emergence of drug resistance the prevalence is not subsiding, and in fact has spread to central Europe. For example, during the late 1990s hundreds of cases were reported in Switzerland.

== Pathogenicity ==
L. donovani is the causative agent of visceral leishmaniasis, traditionally known as kala-azar ("black fever", particularly in India), because of its characteristic symptoms. The disease is highly lethal if not treated properly. The incubation period generally ranges from 3 to 6 months, and in some cases may be over a year. In Indian leishmaniasis, incubation can be as short as 10 days. The target cells are those of mononuclear phagocyte system. The two main tissues of infection are spleen and liver.

Clinical symptoms include pyrexia (recurring high fever which may be continuous or remittent), enlargement of spleen and liver, and heavy skin pigmentation which darkens the physical appearance (the reason for naming "black fever"). To a lesser extent, mucosa of the small intestine and lymph nodes are also invaded by the parasite. Morphological symptoms are noticeable particularly on facial and abdominal regions. Skin becomes coarse and hard. In African infections, warty eruptions are common. In a fully developed stage, the patient shows emaciation and anaemia. Where medical facilities are poor, mortality can be as high as 75–95% within 2 years of epidemics. The disease is often accompanied by complications with dysentery, tuberculosis, septicaemia and even HIV infection.

=== Cellular invasion and immunological response ===
Amastigotes of L. donovani enter macrophages via a Rac1- and Arf6-dependent process, and are found in phagocytic vacuoles that interact with endosomes and lysosomes and acquire lysosomal features. During phagocytosis by macrophages, the promastigotes inhibit the formation of the phagolysosome, a cellular product by which invading pathogens are removed. The promastigote can do this using its glycolipid lipophosphoglycan (LPG) on its cell membrane. LPG causes disorganisation of F-actin and disruption of phagosomal lipid microdomains. They are capable of evading the microbicidal actions of macrophages, which can kill ordinary pathogens using reactive nitrogen and oxygen intermediates. They effectively subvert the production of reactive oxygen species. In this way the amastigotes are able to survive and replicate inside these primary immune systems. The parasites manipulate the cell signalling pathway of the macrophages, such as down-regulating of Jak/stat signalling, NO and TNF-α production, and also by blocking the NF-κB-dependent pathway. There are two major mechanisms of immune evasion such as induction of immune suppressive IL-10 responses and the generation of poor and functionally impaired CD8(+) T-cell responses.

=== L.donovani's requirement for host's lipid bodies ===
L.donovani requires lipid bodies (LBs) and fatty acids (FAs) from the host for its proliferation. One key regulator of LB biogenesis and transport is Rab18, a member of the Rab family of small GTPases, which are primarily involved in vesicle trafficking. The activation of Rab GTPases requires guanine nucleotide exchange factors (GEFs), which facilitate the exchange of GDP for GTP. In the case of Rab18, its GEF is the TRAPP II complex, composed of TRAPPC9 and TRAPPC10. Rab18 and TRAPPC9/10 expression is downregulated by miR-1914-3p, however during Leishmania infection Rab18 and TRAPPC9/10 expression rise and miR-1914-3p lowers. This is because L.donovani's metalloprotease gp65 degrades dicer during infection, which leads to miRNA's being underexpressed.

When LBs are over produced, they are trafficked to parasites' parasitophorous vacuoles where L.donovani derives FAs from them. These FAs are then used for efficient proliferation.

== Treatment ==
The conventional treatment method is an intravenous injection with antimony compounds, such as pentostam. Unfortunately, these chemotherapeutics are so poisonous that about 15% of the patients die from the treatments. To compound the situation, drug resistance has evolved in the parasites against the traditional antimonials. According to rough estimates, about 40% of patients in India are already resistant to this therapy.

Another antimicrobial drug amphotericin B is also commonly used. Liposomal amphotericin B (L-AmB) has been a drug of choice in India, but is practically useless in Africa because of low effectiveness in the African strain of the parasite. Further, amphotericin B has severe adverse effects. Its acute effects includes nausea, vomiting, rigors, fever, hypertension or hypotension, and hypoxia, and its chronic effect is nephrotoxicity.

In 1999, an anticancer drug miltefosine was demonstrated to be highly effective (95% cure rate) among Indian patients. This was the first time an oral drug is effective for visceral leishmaniasis. Clinical trials showed that the new drug is relatively harmless. The most adverse effects were only vomiting and diarrhoea in 20–28% patients, which were rather mild. The drug has been officially approved in India. The recommended dosage is 100 mg per day over a period of four weeks.

Because of resistance development and harsh side effects, new therapeutics are needed to treat leishmaniasis. The gp65 metalloprotease have been proposed as a new drug target, due to its important role during an infection.

== Evolution ==
L. donovani is now considered to be a species complex as indicated by different pathological symptoms occurring in different geographical areas where the species of the vector sandfly are also different. However, none of the parasites are morphologically distinguishable, except by molecular analysis, making them cryptic species. Molecular data show that genotype is strongly correlated with geographical origin. DNA sequencing of different geographical strains indicates that the protozoan complex can be classified into two valid taxa, L. donovani and L. infantum. The genus Leishmania most likely originated in South America, from where it migrated to Asia. L. donovani and L. infantum diverged ~1 Mya, with further divergence of infraspecific genetic groups between 0.4 and 0.8 Mya.
