= Climate change and infectious diseases =

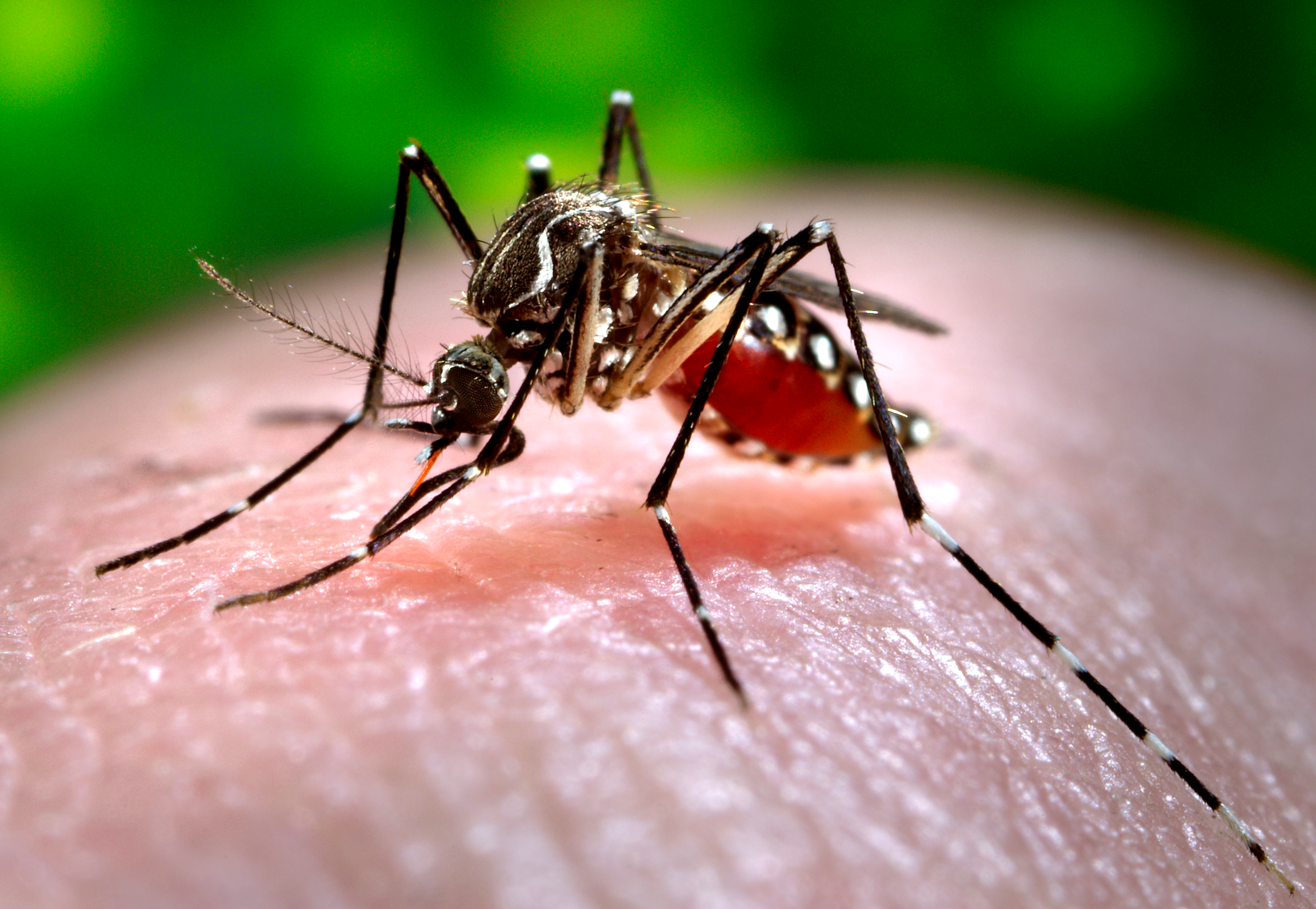
Climate change is altering the geographic range and seasonality of some insects that can carry diseases, for example Aedes aegypti, the mosquito that is the vector for dengue transmission.

Climate change is influencing the transmission and burden of many infectious diseases worldwide. Rising temperatures, shifting rainfall patterns, and more frequent extreme weather events affect how pathogens, vectors and disease hosts interact. These changes are altering the geographic ranges and seasonal activity of disease-carrying organisms such as mosquitoes and ticks, and influence the growth and survival of bacteria and other pathogens in food and water systems.

Infectious diseases that are sensitive to climate can be grouped into: vector-borne diseases (transmitted via mosquitos, ticks etc.), waterborne diseases (transmitted through viruses or bacteria in water), and food-borne diseases (spread through pathogens in food). In 2022 scientists stated a clear observation that "the occurrence of climate-related food-borne and waterborne diseases has increased."

Vector-borne diseases like dengue fever, malaria, tick-borne diseases, leishmaniasis, zika fever, chikungunya and Ebola are especially sensitive to climatic conditions. Warmer and wetter conditions expand suitable habitats for vectors, enabling them to survive in areas that were previously too cold or dry. As temperatures rise at higher elevations and latitudes, transmission risks are expected to increase in parts of North America, Europe, and highland regions of Africa and Asia. For example, the range of ticks that transmit Lyme disease and tick-borne encephalitis has expanded, and further warming could lengthen their active seasons.

Climate change also affects waterborne and food-borne diseases by influencing water quality, sanitation, and microbial ecology. Warmer waters and increased flooding promote the growth and spread of bacteria such as Vibrio cholerae, which causes cholera, and other pathogens responsible for gastroenteritis and wound infections. Drought and poor access to clean water increase the risk of contamination and exposure to diarrheal diseases, typhoid, and hepatitis A.

The health impacts of these climate-related risks are unevenly distributed. Low-income countries and communities with high socio-economic constraints and limited healthcare, infrastructure and sanitation are the most vulnerable. Nearly one in three people globally lack access to safe drinking water, which amplifies exposure to waterborne pathogens and related illnesses. These conditions can also affect mental and social well-being and place additional strain on public health systems.

Without mitigation and adaptation measures, climate-related infectious disease risks will continue to rise. Limiting greenhouse gas emissions, strengthening disease surveillance, vector control, vaccination, water and sanitation services, and climate-resilient healthcare infrastructure is seen as essential to reducing these impacts.

== Background ==
The World Health Organization considers climate change as one of the greatest threats to human health. Global warming, increased rainfall, flooding and drought are some of the consequences of climate change that are leading to the escalation of vector, food and water-borne diseases. Climate change can make it easier for infectious diseases to spread to new regions and surge in areas where they were previously under control. As a result, diseases that have never previously infected humans (Disease X) may 'spill over' from animals and become a threat to humans too. More than half (218 out of 375) of infectious diseases that affect humans worldwide have already been worsened by climate change.

== Mechanisms and pathways ==
The successful emergence or reemergence of infectious diseases depend on people coming into contact with the pathogen (for example a virus) but also on the extent to which peoples' resistance is weakened, or the pathogen is strengthened, by changes in the environment.

Climate change can increase the spread of infectious diseases through multiple possible pathways, including:

- climatic hazards (such as heatwaves, wildfires, or floods) bringing the disease closer to people (e.g. shifts in the geographical range of species),
- climatic hazards bringing people closer to the disease (e.g. heatwaves bringing more people to recreational water activities),
- disease strengthened by climatic hazards (e.g. "improved climate suitability for reproduction, acceleration of the life cycle, increasing seasons/length of likely exposure", for example ocean warming can lead to increased Vibriosis outbreaks),
- people impaired by climatic hazards (e.g. from malnutrition due to drought conditions)
- climatic hazards forcing people to leave their homes (climate migration) and live in unsanitary circumstances and dense living situations such as refugee camps,
- increased occupational exposure to climate and climate extremes (e.g. agricultural work, construction work, disaster response work).

Infectious diseases that are sensitive to climate can be grouped into:

- water-borne diseases (transmitted via viruses or bacteria, e.g.: E. Coli),
- vector-borne diseases (transmitted via mosquitos, ticks etc.), and
- food-borne diseases (e.g. Salmonella bacteria, causing Salmonellosis).

Climate change is affecting the distribution of these diseases due to the expanding geographic range and seasonality of these diseases and their vectors.

Though many infectious diseases are affected by changes in climate, vector-borne diseases, such as malaria, dengue fever and leishmaniasis, present the strongest causal relationship. One reason for that is that temperature and rainfall play a key role in the distribution, magnitude, and viral capacity of mosquitoes, who are primary vectors for many vectors borne diseases. Observation and research detect a shift of pests and pathogens in the distribution away from the equator and towards Earth's poles.

=== Changes to vector distribution ===
Climate change affects vector-borne diseases by affecting the survival, distribution and behavior of vectors such as mosquitoes, ticks and rodents. The viruses, bacteria and protozoa are carried by these vectors transferring them from one carrier to another. Vectors and pathogens can adapt to the climate fluctuations by shifting and expanding their geographic ranges, which alter the rate of new cases of disease depending on vector-host interaction, host immunity and pathogen evolution. This means that climate change affects infectious diseases by changing the length of the transmission season and their geographical range.

Climate change is leading to latitudinal and altitudinal temperature increases. Global warming projections indicate that surface air warming for a "high scenario" is 4 C, with a likely range of 2.4–6.4 C by 2100. A temperature increase of this size would alter the biology and the ecology of many mosquito vectors and the dynamics of the diseases they transmit such as malaria.

Changes in climate and global warming have significant influences on the biology and distribution of vector-borne diseases, parasites, fungi, and their associated illnesses. Regional changes resulting from changing weather conditions and patterns within temperate climates will stimulate the reproduction of certain insect species that are vectors for disease.

The vectors of transmission are the major reason for the increased ranges and infection of these diseases. If the vector has a range shift, so do the associated diseases; if the vector increases in activity due to changes in climate, then there is an effect on the transmission of disease. However it will be hard to classify exactly why the range shifts or an increase in infection rates occurs as there are many other factors to consider besides climate change, such as human migration, poverty, infrastructure quality, and land usage; but climate change is still potentially a key factor.

Mosquitoes

One major disease-spreading insect is the mosquito, which can transmit diseases like malaria, West Nile virus, and dengue fever. With regional temperatures changing due to climate change, the range of mosquitos will change as well. The range of mosquitoes and disease transmission will move farther north and south, and places will have a longer period of mosquito habitability than at present, leading to an increase in the mosquito population in these areas. This range shift has already been seen in highland Africa. Since 1970, the incidence of malaria in high-elevation areas in East Africa has increased greatly. This has been proven to be caused by the warming of regional climates.

Many major cities in Africa (e.g.: Nairobi, Harare) were sited above the mosquito breeding-transmission altitude, but due to increasing temperatures mosquitos are now more likely to thrive in these areas as well. In Europe, Dengue cases were transmitted by populations of mosquitoes established in France and Italy.

Environmental changes, climate variability, and climate change are factors that could affect biology and disease ecology of Anopheles mosquitoes and their disease transmission potential. When the temperature rises, the larvae take a shorter time to mature and, consequently, a greater capacity to produce more offspring. In turn this leads to an increase in malaria transmission to humans.

Environmental changes such as deforestation could also increase local temperatures in the highlands thus could enhance the vector capacity of the anopheles. Anopheles mosquitoes are responsible for the transmission of a number of diseases in the world, such as, malaria, lymphatic filariasis and viral fevers such as the O'nyong'nyong virus.

=== Environmental change and zoonotic disease emergence ===
Climate change is considered a significant driver of zoonotic disease emergence due to its effects on ecosystems, wildlife distribution, and patterns of human–animal interaction. Increases in global temperature, changes in precipitation, and the growing frequency of extreme weather events can disrupt ecological systems and contribute to shifts in species ranges. Such changes may increase contact between wildlife, livestock, and human populations, thereby elevating the risk of cross-species pathogen transmission.

The geographic distribution of vector-borne diseases is also influenced by climatic factors. Variations in temperature and precipitation can extend the habitat range and seasonal activity of vectors such as mosquitoes and ticks. Consequently, diseases including dengue fever and Lyme disease have been reported in regions where they were previously uncommon, particularly at higher latitudes and elevations. These shifts present challenges for public health systems in affected areas.

Environmental changes associated with climate change, including deforestation, habitat fragmentation, and biodiversity loss, further contribute to zoonotic disease risk. Alterations in ecosystems may favor species that serve as efficient reservoirs for infectious agents, while increased human encroachment into natural habitats can facilitate pathogen transmission between species.

A number of zoonotic diseases have been linked to environmental change. For example, Ebola virus disease has been associated with forest disturbance and increased human–wildlife interaction, while the incidence of tick-borne diseases such as Lyme disease has increased in regions experiencing milder winters. Similarly, the distribution of mosquito-borne diseases such as dengue continues to shift in response to changing climatic conditions.

Mitigating the health impacts of climate change requires a One Health approach that recognizes the interdependence of human, animal, and environmental health. Integrated surveillance systems, interdisciplinary collaboration, and policies addressing environmental sustainability are considered important components of efforts to reduce zoonotic disease risk.

==== Increased water temperature ====
High temperatures can alter the survival, replication, and virulence of a pathogen. Higher temperatures can also increase the pathogen yields in animal reservoirs. An increase in yield of bacteria from drinking water delivery systems has been recorded in warmer summer months. During periods of warmer temperatures water consumption rates are also typically higher. Together these increase the probability of pathogen ingestion and infection.

With an increase in both temperature as well as higher nutrient concentrations due to runoff there will be an increase in cyanobacterial blooms.

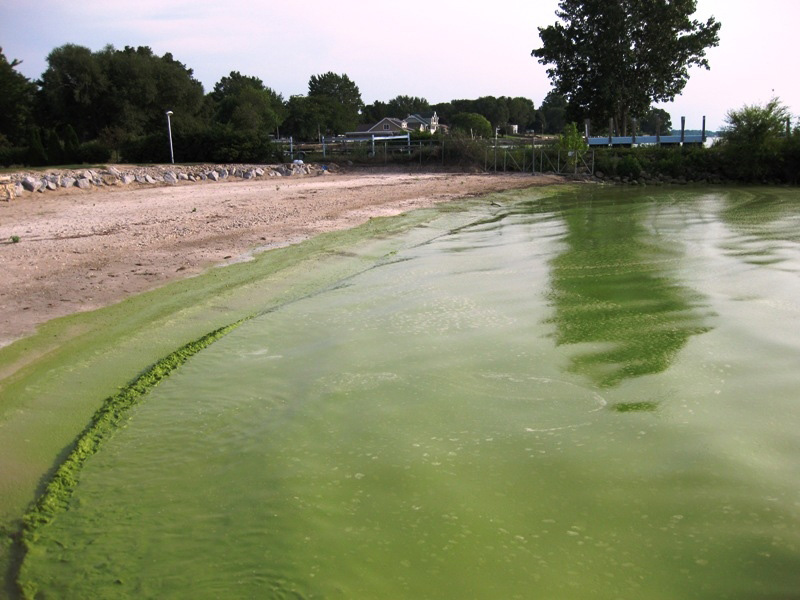
Cyanobacteria (blue-green algae) bloom on Lake Erie (United States) in 2009. These kinds of algae can cause harmful algal blooms.

The warming oceans and lakes are leading to more frequent harmful algal blooms. Also, during droughts, surface waters are even more susceptible to harmful algal blooms and microorganisms. Algal blooms increase water turbidity, suffocating aquatic plants, and can deplete oxygen, killing fish. Some kinds of blue-green algae (cyanobacteria) create neurotoxins, hepatoxins, cytotoxins or endotoxins that can cause serious and sometimes fatal neurological, liver and digestive diseases in humans. Cyanobacteria grow best in warmer temperatures (especially above 25 degrees Celsius), and so climate change makes harmful algal blooms to be more frequent and last longer.

One of these toxin producing algae is Pseudo-nitzschia fraudulenta. This species produces a substance called domoic acid which is responsible for amnesic shellfish poisoning. The toxicity of this species has been shown to increase with greater CO_{2} concentrations associated with ocean acidification. Some of the more common illnesses reported from harmful algal blooms include; Ciguatera fish poisoning, paralytic shellfish poisoning, azaspiracid shellfish poisoning, diarrhetic shellfish poisoning, neurotoxic shellfish poisoning and the above-mentioned amnesic shellfish poisoning.

=== Changes in precipitation and water cycle ===
Climate change is forecast to have substantial effects on the water cycle, with an increase in both frequency and intensity of droughts and heavy precipitation events.

There is generally an increase in diarrheal disease (except for viral diarrheal disease) during or after elevated ambient temperature, heavy rainfall, and flooding. These three weather conditions are predicted to increase or intensify with climate change in future. A high current baseline rate of the diarrheal diseases is already present in developing countries. Climate change therefore poses a real risk of an increase of these diseases in those regions.

=== Increased psychological stress ===
The climate crisis can cause psychological stress for populations threatened by changing weather patterns. The climate crisis can cause stress especially in people living in areas where flooding is increasing, severe storms are destroying homes and they are being forced to move away. Climate change can also impact people's mental health through affect their workplaces and livelihoods. For example, farmers are particularly under stress because of the reducing capability of climate-affected land to produce crops and animal feed. Stress increases the level of stress-hormone cortisol in blood, a suppressor of the immune mechanisms responsible for protection against infections and cancers. This leads to humans becoming inherently less able to resist new infections because of the climate crisis.

One proven mitigation against psychological stress is interaction with the natural environment but the climate crisis is also a nature and biodiversity crisis and the human race is becoming less able to find natural spaces to relax and to release the stresses of modern-day living.

== Infectious diseases in humans ==
=== Malaria ===
Deaths due to malaria per million persons in 2012 0–0 1–2 3–54 55–325 326–679 680–949 950–1,358

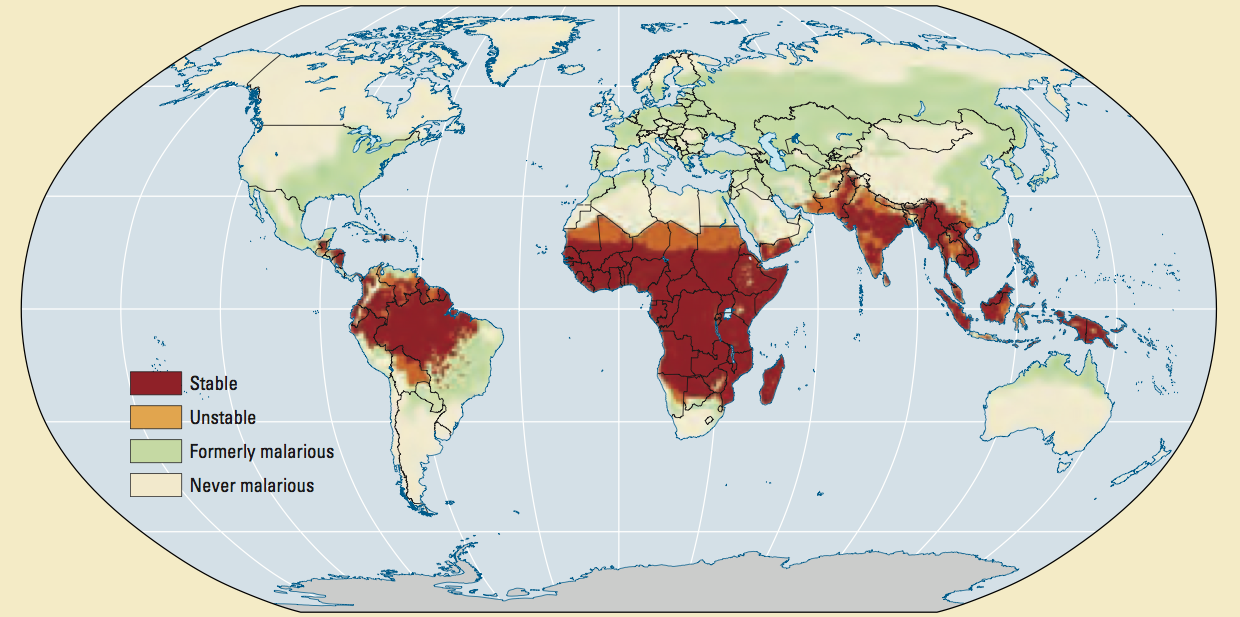
Past and current malaria prevalence in 2009

Malaria is a mosquito-borne disease that infects humans and other animals caused by microorganisms in the Plasmodium family. It begins with a bite from an infected female mosquito, which introduces the parasite through its saliva and into the infected host's circulatory system. It then travels through the bloodstream into the liver, where it can mature and reproduce.

Climate is an influential driving force of diseases such as malaria, which kills about 300,000 children annually. Malaria is especially susceptible to the effects of climate change because mosquitoes lack the mechanisms to regulate their internal temperature. This implies that there is a limited range of climatic conditions within which the pathogen (malaria) and vector (a mosquito) can survive, reproduce, and infect hosts. Increased rainfall and temperatures could increase the number of mosquitos indirectly by creating better environments for survival and reproduction, expand larval habitat and food supply. There will also be greater risks of outbreaks of malaria due to increased flooding events, especially affecting the drier areas of the tropics, such as the Sahel and East Africa.

Conservative estimates suggest that the risk of malaria will increase 5–15% by 2100 due to climate change. In Africa alone, there is a projected increase of 16–28% in person-month exposures to malaria by 2100.

=== Dengue fever ===
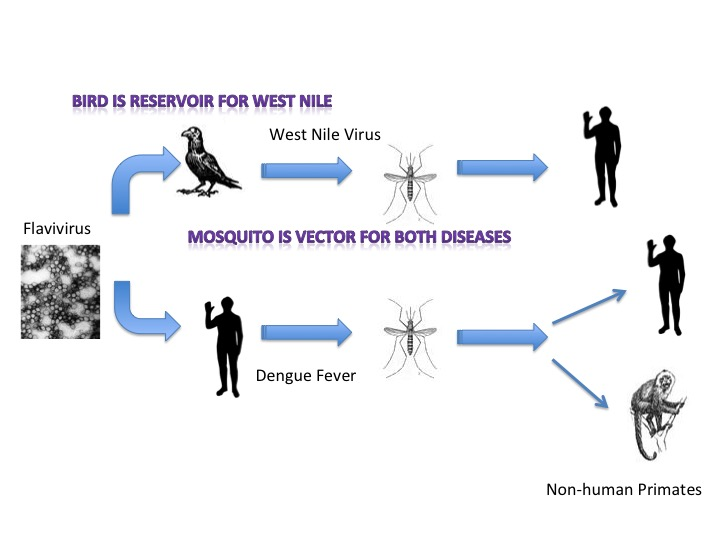
This figure shows how the Flavivirus is carried by mosquitos in the West Nile virus and Dengue fever. The mosquito would be considered a disease vector.

Dengue fever is an infectious disease caused by dengue viruses found in tropical and sub-tropical regions. It is transmitted through bites from female mosquitos in the genus Aedes, primarily A. aegypti. Dengue fever can be fatal.

The cases of dengue fever have been increasing dramatically and is projected to continue to do so with changing climate conditions. In just the past 50 years, transmission has increased drastically with new cases of the disease (incidence) increasing 30-fold. The number of reported cases of dengue has increased from 505 430 cases in 2000 to 14.6 million in 2024. However, dengue cases are under-reported and it is estimated that there might be 100–400 million infections occurring each year.

High temperatures, increased precipitation, and humidity all increase the risk of dengue infection. The presence and number of Aedes aegypti mosquitoes is strongly influenced by the amount of water-bearing containers in the home and rubbish such as tin cans and tires contributing to pockets of stagnant water in an area. The species is also influenced by daily temperature and variation in temperature, moisture, and solar radiation.

Climate change is altering the geographic range and seasonality of the mosquito that can carry dengue. While dengue fever is primarily considered a tropical and subtropical disease, the geographic ranges of the Aedes aegypti are expanding with dengue cases reported in European and Eastern Mediterranean regions. Climate change also contributed to the spread of distinct variants of the disease to new areas.

=== Tick borne disease ===
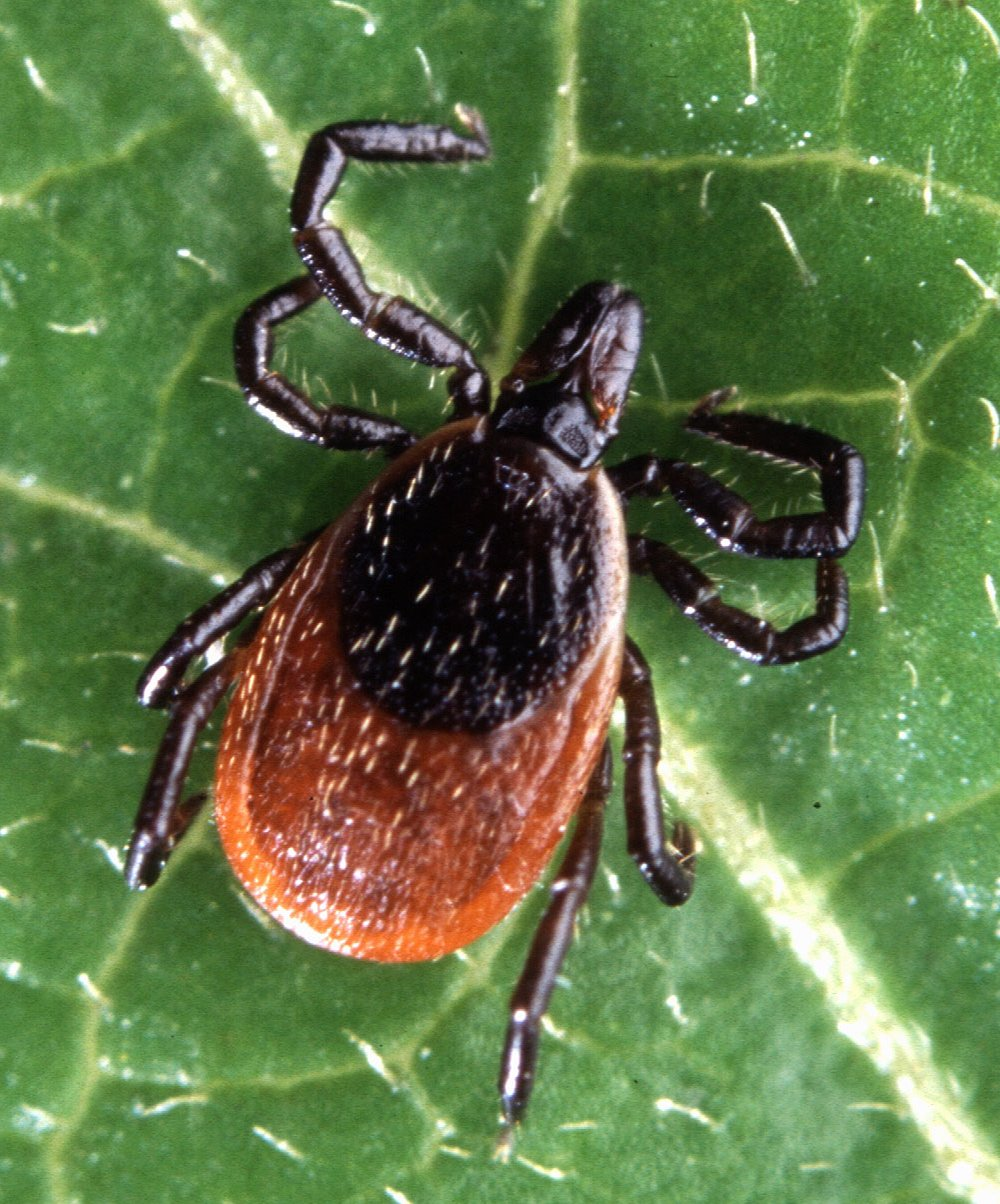
The deer tick, a vector for Lyme disease pathogens

Tick-borne disease, which affect humans and other animals, are caused by infectious agents transmitted by tick bites. Diseases spread by ticks include tick-borne encephalitis, Lyme disease, anaplasmosis, babesiosis, ehrlichiosis and spotted fever rickettsiosis.

Climate, especially temperature and precipitation, affects the life-cycle, population size and geographic range of ticks. A high humidity of greater than 85% is ideal for a tick to start and finish its life cycle. Higher maximum temperatures play the most influential role in sustaining tick populations. Tick life cycles span multiple seasons as they mature from larva to nymph to adult, and infection and spread of diseases such as Lyme disease can happen across the multiple stages and different species of animal hosts.

The expansion of tick populations is concurrent with global climate change. Species distribution models of recent years indicate that the deer tick (Ixodes scapularis) is pushing its distribution to higher latitudes in Europe, Canada and Northeastern United States, and pushing and maintaining populations in the South Central and Northern Midwest regions of the United States. Climate models project further expansion of tick habit north into Canada as progressing Northwest from the Northeastern United States. Additionally, however, tick populations are expected to retreat from the Southeastern coast of the U.S., but this has not yet been observed. It's estimated that coinciding with this expansion, increased average temperatures may double tick populations by 2020 as well as bring an earlier start to the tick exposure season. In Europe, expansion of tick-borne diseases to the north due to climate change has already been observed, especially for Lyme disease and tick-borne encephalitis.

=== Leishmaniasis ===
Leishmaniasis is a neglected tropical disease, caused by parasites of the genus Leishmania and primarily transmitted by Phelbotomus sand flies. It is distributed mostly in tropical and subtropical regions around the world, wherever the sand flies and suitable animal hosts are present. Around 12 million people around the world are living with leishmaniasis. Risk factors that increase the spread of this disease include poverty, urbanization, deforestation, and climate change.

As in other vector-borne diseases, one of the reasons climate changes can affect the incidence of leishmaniasis is the susceptibility of the sandfly vectors to changes in temperature, rainfall and humidity. These conditions alter their range of distribution and seasonality. For example, climate change could increase the suitable conditions for Phlebotomus sandfly species in Central Europe and Lutzomyia longipalpis in the Amazon basin. Parasite development inside the sand for some species of Leishmania can also be affected by temperature changes.

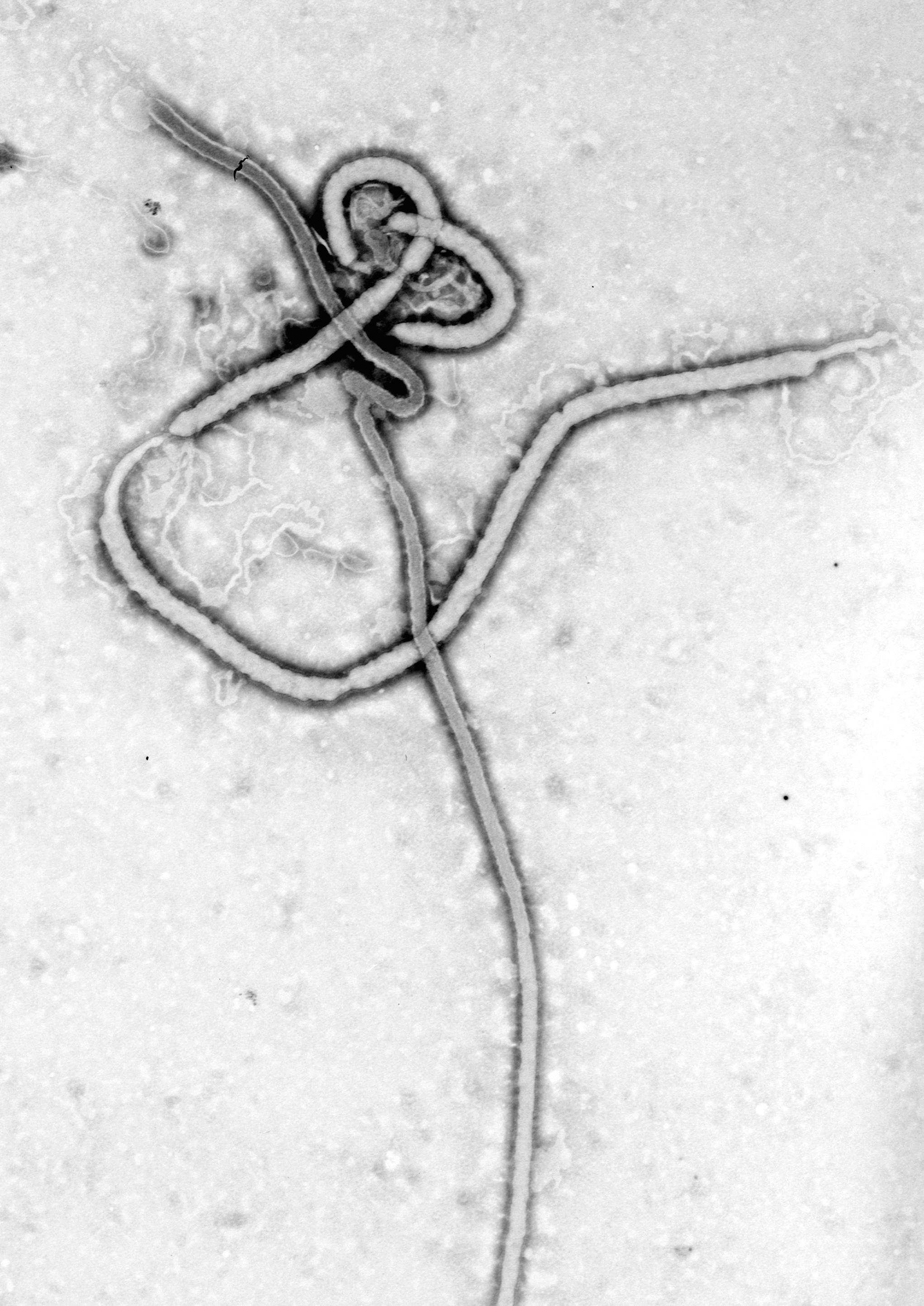
Ebola virus

=== Ebola ===
The Ebola virus has caused periodic outbreaks across several African countries. With an average fatality rate of about 40%, the disease has led to more than 28,600 reported cases and 11,310 deaths. Areas undergoing deforestation are among the most likely places for outbreaks due to changes in the landscape bringing wildlife into closer contact with humans.

Climate change may indirectly contribute to the rise in Ebola cases. Extreme weather events such as droughts, strong winds, thunderstorms, heat waves, floods, landslides, and shifting rainfall patterns can disrupt wildlife migration, pushing animals out of their natural habitats and nearer to human settlements. For instance, a severe drought in Central Africa intensified food insecurity, leading some West African communities to hunt and consume infected animals such as bats, which likely fueled an Ebola outbreak.

=== Zika fever ===
Zika virus, a vector-borne virus, was historically presented in cluster outbreaks in the tropical regions of Africa and Asia. Zika fever is mainly spread via the bite of mosquitoes of the Aedes type, which is expanding its range. Zika fever epidemics have affected larger populations including Micronesia and South Pacific Islands in 2007, and the Americas in 2013. Brazil experienced one of the largest outbreaks of Zika virus with approximately 1.5 million cases reported in 2015. Pregnant women infected with Zika virus are at a higher risk of giving birth to children with birth defects, including microcephaly.

It is predicted that Zika virus will expose more than 1.3 billion new people by 2050 due to climate change. This increase is largely due to the expansion of habitats conducive to vector growth and life cycles, particularly areas with temperatures ranging from 23.9 °C to 34 °C. Rising temperatures also influence mosquito behavior, leading to higher breeding and biting rates. Extreme climate patterns, such as drought, floods and heatwaves further enhance mosquito breeding conditions and as a result escalate the rate of virus-borne diseases.

=== Hantavirus ===
Hantavirus are a genus of zoonotic viruses that causes two fatal diseases: hantavirus pulmonary syndrome (HPS) and hemorrhagic fever with renal syndrome (HFRS). These diseases were transmitted to humans mainly by infected rodents. As the climate warms, extreme weather events (such as floods, intense storms or droughts) alters the availability of food and shelter for rodents, which in turn causes their populations to grow as well as intensifying the fluctuation of population cycles, directly increasing the threat of hantavirus outbreaks in some regions specifically Latin America and the Caribbean. A notable example is the 1993 Four Corners hantavirus outbreak. Preceding the outbreak, The 1992–1993 El Niño brought a dramatic increase in rainfall, which expanded food supplies and caused rodent numbers to grow 20-fold. The event led to rodent infestations in human buildings, thus increasing the risk of an infection.

Rising temperatures causes the range expansion of rodents into previously uninhabited zones, like higher altitudes, establishing newly, high-risk area for hantavirus transmission. In Europe, expanding geographic range of hantavirus is linked to milder winters driven by climate change, as well as other factors such as the decline of small-mammal diversity and frequent masting cycles.

=== COVID-19 ===
There is no direct evidence that the spread of COVID-19 is worsened or caused by climate change, although investigations continue. As of 2020, the World Health Organization summarized the current knowledge about the issue as follows: "There is no evidence of a direct connection between climate change and the emergence or transmission of COVID-19 disease. [...] However, climate change may indirectly affect the COVID-19 response, as it undermines environmental determinants of health, and places additional stress on health systems."

A 2021 study found possible links between climate change and transmission of COVID-19 by bats. The authors found that climate-driven changes in the distribution and richness of bat species increased the likelihood of bat-borne coronaviruses in the Yunnan province, Myanmar, and Laos. This region was also the habitat of Sunda pangolins and masked palm civits which were suspected as intermediate hosts of COVID-19 between bats and humans. The authors suggest, therefore, that climate change possibly contributed to some extent to the emergence of the pandemic.

Climate change might induce changes to bat habitats which may have driven them closer to populated areas. Increased aridity and drought periods are predicted to push bats out of their endemic areas and into populated areas. This creates a knock-on effect of increasing their interactions with humans and hence the likelihood of zoonotic disease transfer.

=== HIV/AIDS ===
There is a growing impact of the climate crisis in driving HIV risk which is affecting the availability of and access to services for HIV treatment, prevention and care. 3.6 billion people live in regions highly susceptible to climate change, and many of those populations are disproportionately affected by HIV. Increased migration and population displacement, food insecurity, economic stress, conflict, communicable diseases, and the erosion of health infrastructure can increase the rates of HIV infection and worsen the health and wellbeing of people with HIV.

The climate crisis can impact HIV programmes and people with HIV in various ways, for example reducing access to prevention, testing, and treatment services, contributing to poor nutrition, impaired immunity, and poor adherence to treatment. It can also increase the risk of contracting HIV, for example through food insecurity forcing people to engage in transactional sex, and can worsen the discrimination of populations most affected by HIV. Reductions in international aid reductions, the discontinuation of the US President's Emergency Plan for AIDS Relief (PEPFAR) could cause around 4–11 million new HIV infections and 1–3 million HIV-related deaths between 2025 and 2030.

Based on mathematical models, if there is no reduction in carbon emissions it is expected that there will be an increase of between 11 million and 16 million HIV cases in countries in sub-Saharan Africa by 2050 as a result of increasing temperatures due to climate change.

HIV outcomes may be affected by the increased spread of vector-borne pathogens to which immunocompromised individuals are more susceptible, notably malaria and fungal diseases such as cryptococcal disease, histoplasmosis, and talaromycosis. The Joint United Nations Programme on HIV/AIDS emphasized that it is essential that HIV programmes consider and monitor the potential effects of climate change.

=== Diarrheal diseases ===
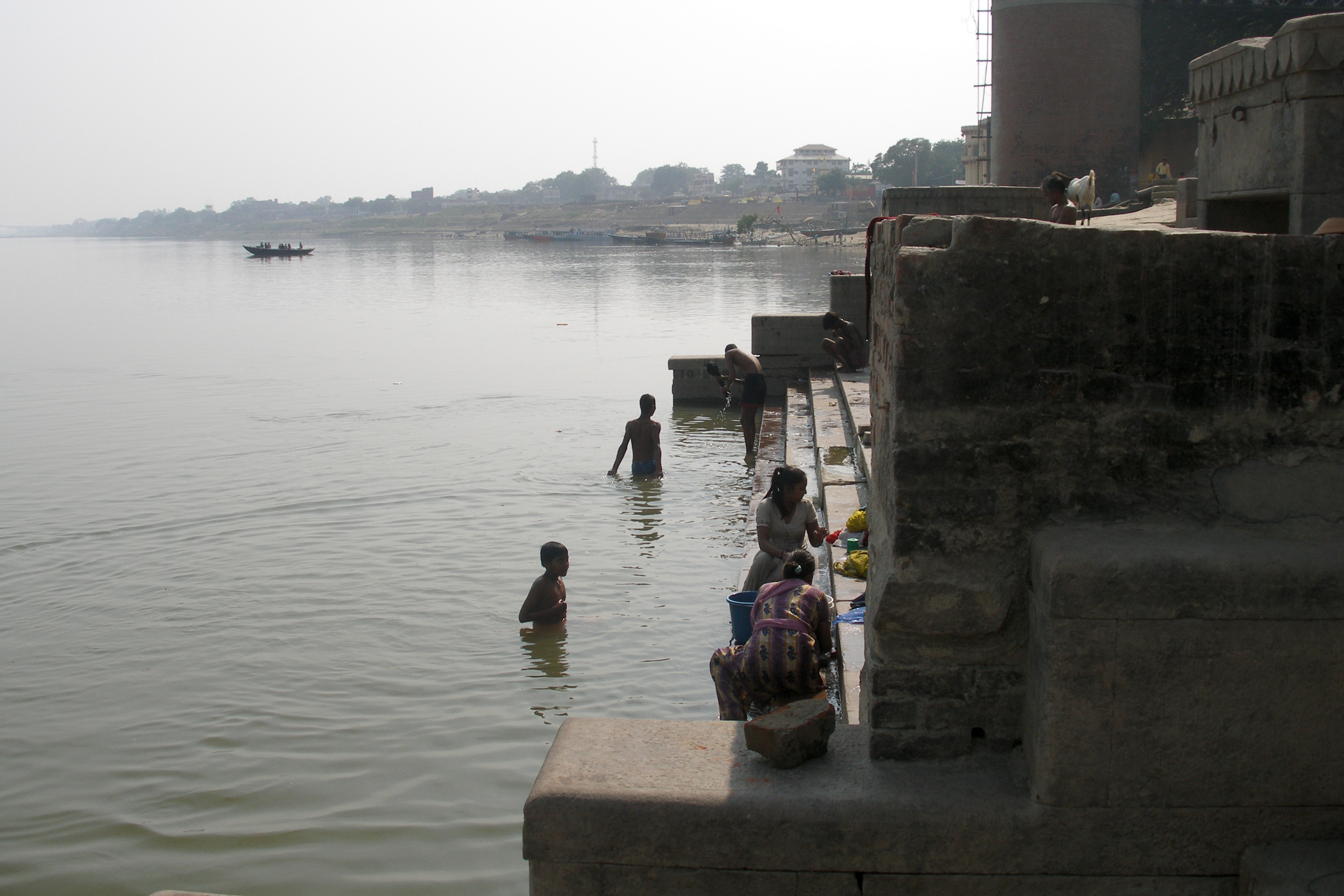
People who bathe in the Ganges River in India may be at risk of hepatitis, typhoid, cholera, amoebic dysentery, other waterborne diseases, and various skin afflictions.

Diarrheal diseases are caused by bacteria, viruses and protozoans. These diseases are transmitted mainly by the feces of an infected individual passing to the mouth of another individual (fecal–oral route), due to limited access to water, sanitation and hygiene. They are the most common waterborne diseases, transmitted through unsafe drinking water or recreational water contact.

Diarrhoeal diseases are the third greatest cause of death in children under 5 years killing around 444,000 children every year. They are also the second leading cause of death in low and middle income countries. Diarrhea diseases account for an estimated 1.4–1.9 million deaths in all ages worldwide.

Diarrhoeal diseases due to bacteria increase with ambient temperature, and increase following heavy rainfall and flooding events. Heavy rainfall and flooding can also affect pathogen transmission via impacts on sanitation and/or drinking water treatment infrastructure, contaminating drinking water sources or food products. Floods can overwhelm water systems, causing backflows that lead to contamination of groundwater and other drinking water sources. Investing in the prevention of diarrheal diseases through improvements in Water, Sanitation and Hygiene (WaSH) systems and other proven diarrhea prevention strategies should be a global priority. A key diarrhoeal disease is cholera.

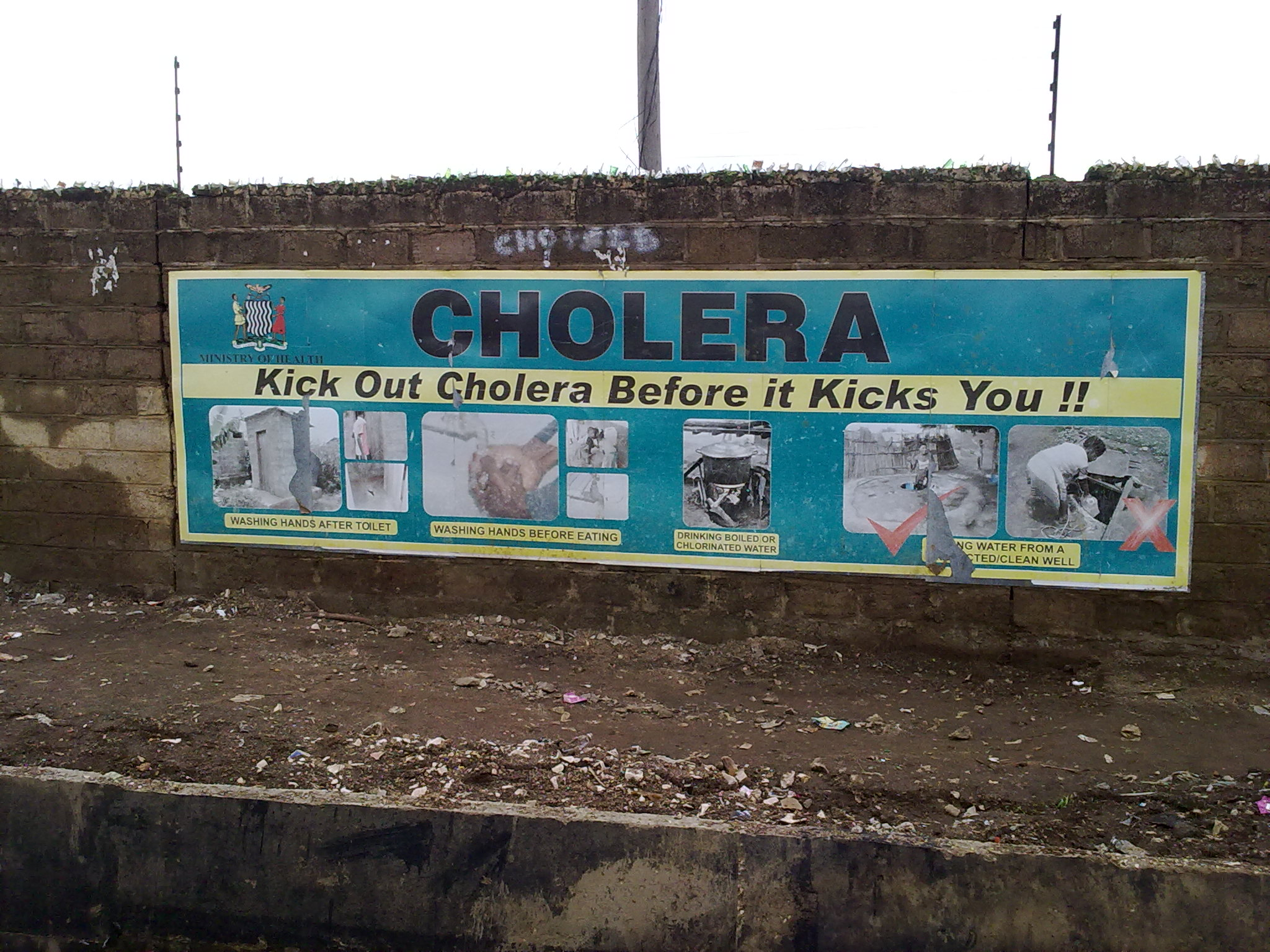
Public cholera prevention signage in Lusaka, Zambia.

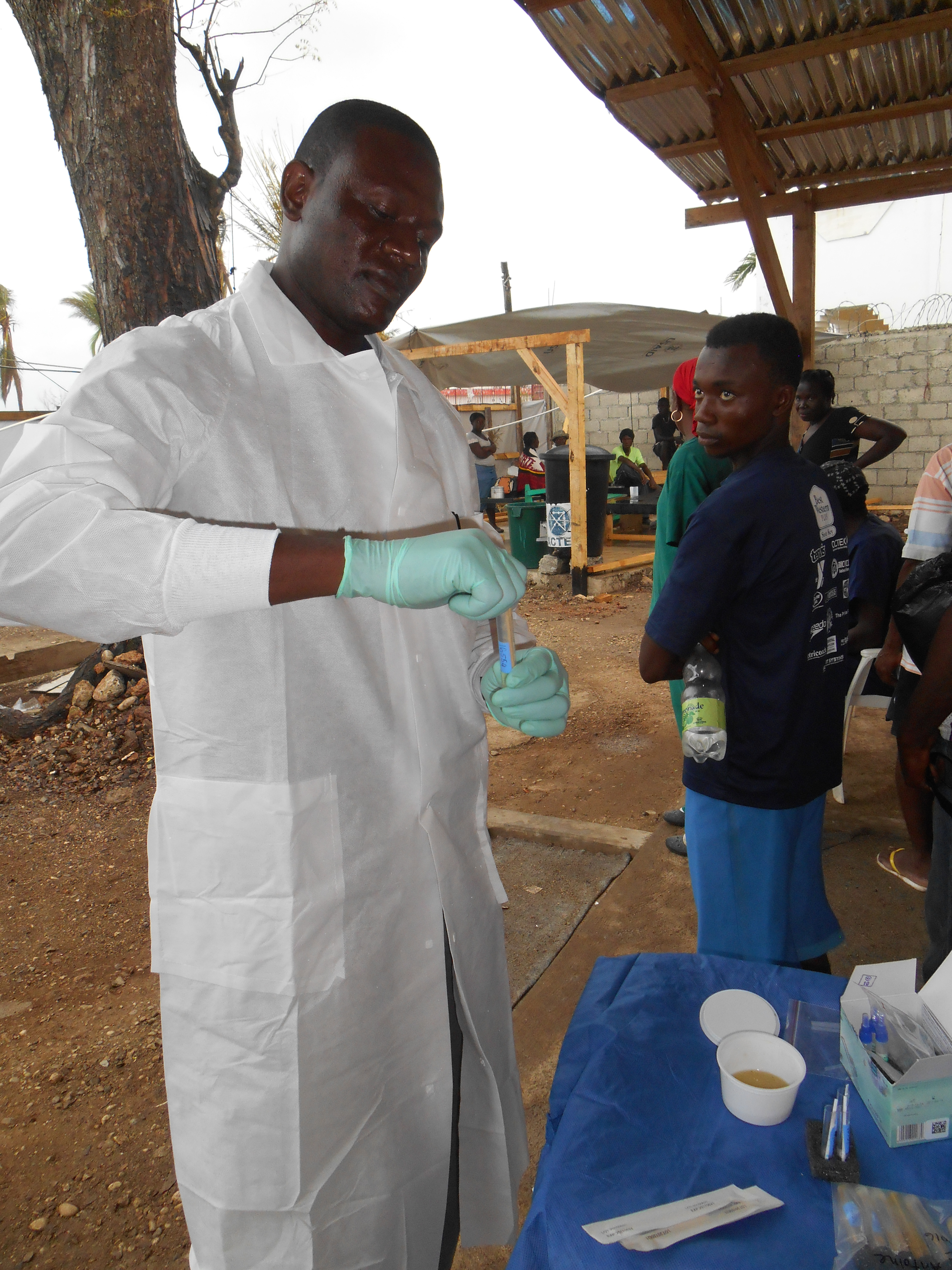
Rapid Diagnostic Testing for cholera in Haiti.

=== Cholera and other vibrio infections ===
Disease outbreaks caused by vibrio (in particular the bacterium that causes cholera, called Vibrio cholerae) are increasing in occurrence and intensity. Vibrio illnesses are waterborne disease that were prevalent especially in Asia and Africa, but they are increasing worldwide as well as, being reported where historically they did not occur. Vibrio infections are caused by consuming contaminated water, raw or undercooked seafood, or by exposing an open wound to contaminated sea water. Vibrio infections are most likely to occur during the warm seasons, especially in areas prone to tropical cyclones.

The warming climate plays a substantial role in the increase in cases and area of occurrence. Even modest temperature increases substantially amplify disease transmission. For example, a 1 °C warming in Zanzibar was associated with a doubling of confirmed cholera cases. Furthermore, prolonged water scarcity concentrates Vibrio cholerae in limited freshwater supplies, while intense precipitation events compromise sanitation infrastructure and create conditions favorable for the spread of the disease. The area of coastline with suitable conditions for vibrio bacteria has increased due to changes in sea surface temperature and sea surface salinity caused by climate change. These pathogens can cause gastroenteritis, cholera, wound infections, and sepsis. It has been observed that in the period of 2011–21, the "area of coastline suitable for Vibrio bacterial transmission has increased by 35% in the Baltics, 25% in the Atlantic Northeast, and 4% in the Pacific Northwest.

=== Skin rashes ===
Rising temperatures and humidity increase the growth of skin-associated bacteria and alter the geographical distribution of other organisms that infect humans. The various microorganisms that make up the skin microflora each have different optimal temperature ranges for survival and growth. Staphylococcus aureus and Corynebacterium sp. amongst others are more tolerant to rising temperatures and higher salt conditions compared to other, non-commensal bacteria.

=== Fungal infections ===
Fungal infections will also see an increase due to the warming of certain climates. For example, the fungus Cryptococcus gattii is normally found in warmer climates such as in Australia, but has now been found in Canada. There are now two strains of this fungus in the northwestern part of North America, affecting many terrestrial animals. The spread of this fungus is hypothesized to be linked to climate change.

=== Naegleria fowleri (brain-eating amoeba) ===
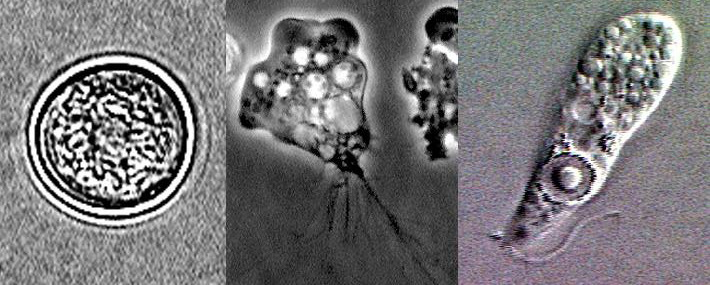
Naegleria fowleri lifecycle stages.

Naegleria fowleri, a percolozoan, thrives as a free-living, thermophilic amoeba in warm freshwater environments such as lakes, rivers, ponds and hot springs. Although infection is still considered rare, cases are becoming more prevalent each year as freshwater temperatures continue to rise. Exposure to this pathogen is commonly caused by recreational water activities, such as swimming or diving, in freshwater where the organism is present. Humans can become infected when water enters the nasal canal. From there the amoebae penetrate the olfactory mucosa and travel to the brain, creating inflammation and eventually causing primary amoebic meningoenephilitis (PAM); which is almost always fatal.

=== Emergence of new infectious diseases ===
There is concern about the emergence of new diseases from the fungal kingdom. Mammals have endothermy and homeothermy, which allows them to maintain elevated body temperature through life; but it can be defeated if the fungi were to adapt to higher temperatures and survive in the body. Fungi are able to adapt rapidly to higher temperatures. The emergence of Candida auris on three continents is proposed to be as a result of global warming and has raised the danger that increased warmth by itself will trigger adaptations on certain microbes to make them pathogenic for humans.

It is projected that interspecies viral sharing, that can lead to novel viral spillovers, will increase due to ongoing climate change-caused geographic range-shifts of mammals (most importantly bats). Risk hotspots would mainly be located at "high elevations, in biodiversity hotspots, and in areas of high human population density in Asia and Africa".

Climate change may also lead to new infectious diseases due to changes in microbial and vector geographic range. Microbes that are harmful to humans can adapt to higher temperatures, which will allow them to build better tolerance against human endothermy defences.

== Infectious diseases in wild animals ==
Climate change and increasing temperatures will also impact the health of wildlife animals. Climate change will impact wildlife disease, specifically affecting "geographic range and distribution of wildlife diseases, plant and animal phenology, wildlife host-pathogen interactions, and disease patterns in wildlife".

The health of wild animals, particularly birds, is assumed to be an indicator of early climate change effects because very little or no control measures are undertaken to protect them.

=== Geographic range and distribution ===
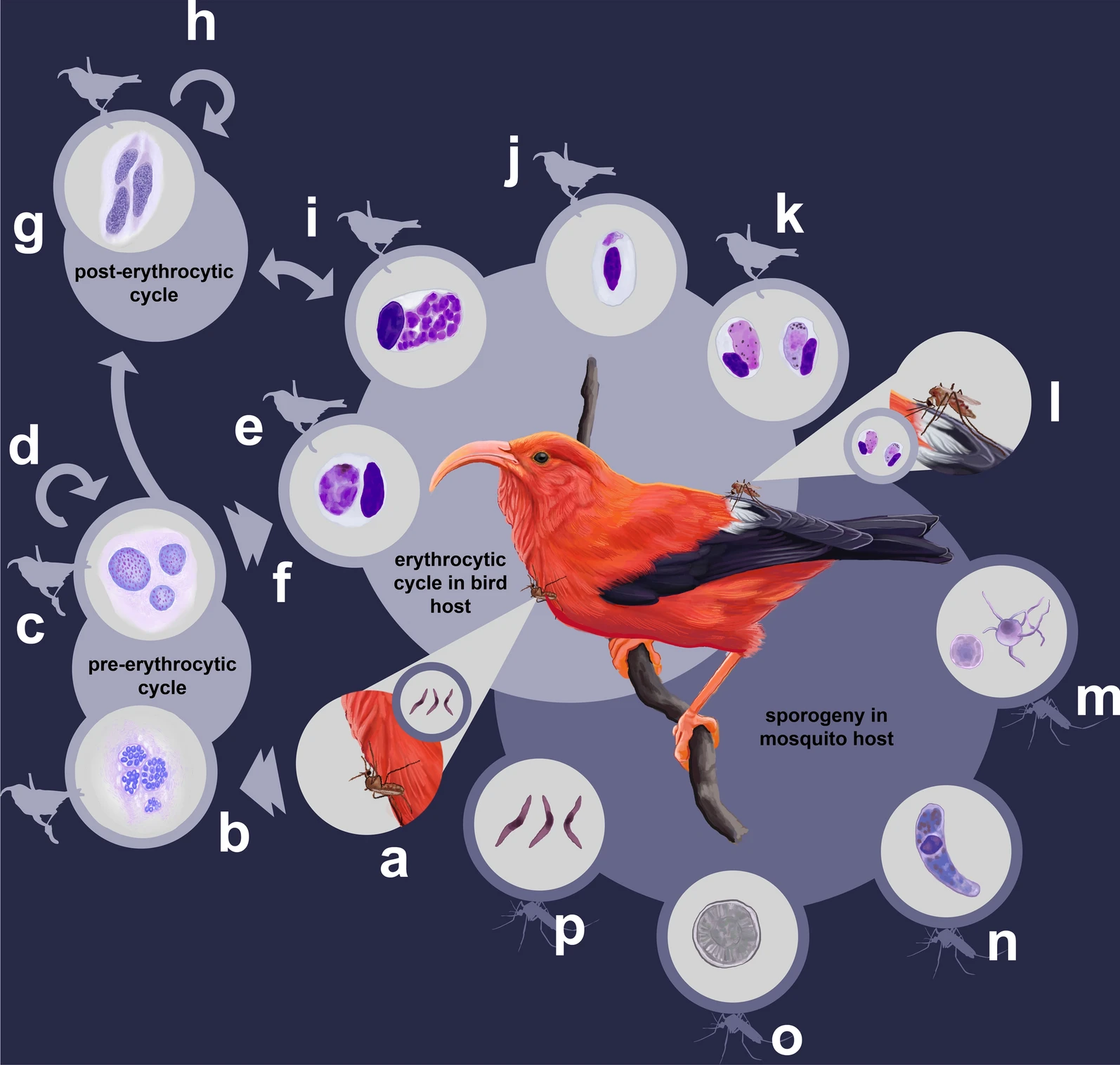
Avian malaria life cycle.

Geographic shifts of disease vectors and parasitic disease in the Northern Hemisphere have likely been due to global warming. The range of Parelaphostrongylus odocoilei, a lung parasite that impacts ungulates like caribou and mountain goats, has been shifting northward since 1995, as has a tick vector for Lyme disease and other tick-borne zoonotic diseases known as Ixodes scapularis.

It is predicted that climate warming will also lead to changes in disease distribution at certain altitudes. At high elevation in the Hawaiian Islands, for example, it is expected that climate warming will allow for year-round transmission of avian malaria. This increased opportunity for transmission will likely be devastating to endangered native Hawaiian birds that have little or no resistance to the disease.

Predicting the impact of climate change on disease patterns in different geographic regions can be difficult, because its effects likely have high variability. This has been more evident in marine ecosystems than terrestrial environments, where massive decline in coral reefs has been observed due to disease spread.

=== Phenology ===
Phenology is the study of seasonal cycles, and with climate change the seasonal biologic cycles of many animals have already been affected. For example, the transmission of tick-borne encephalitis (TBE) is higher to humans when early spring temperatures are warmer. The warmer temperatures result in an overlap in feeding activity of ticks who are infected with the virus (nymphal) with ticks who aren't (larval). This overlapped feeding leads to more uninfected larval ticks acquiring the infection and therefore increases the risk of humans being infected with TBE. Conversely, cooler spring temperatures would result in less overlapped feeding activity and would therefore decrease the risk of zoonotic transmission of TBE.

=== Wildlife host-to-pathogen interaction ===
The transmission of pathogens happens through either direct contact from a diseased animal to another, or indirectly through a host like infected prey or a vector. Higher temperatures as a result of climate change results in an increased presence of disease producing agents in hosts and vectors, and also increases the "survival of animals that harbor disease". Survival of Parelaphostrongylus tenuis, a brain worm of white-tailed deer that affects moose, could be increased due to the higher temperatures and milder winters caused by climate change. In moose this worm causes fatal neurological disease. Moose are already facing heat stress due to climate change, and may have increased susceptibility to parasitic and infectious diseases like the brain worm.

== Infectious diseases in domestic animals and livestock ==
Vector-borne diseases seriously affect the health of domestic animals and livestock (e.g., trypanosomiasis, Rift Valley fever, and bluetongue). Climate change will also indirectly affect the health of humans through its multifaceted impacts on food security, including livestock and plant crops.

While climate-induced heat stress can directly reduce domestic animals' immunity against all diseases, climatic factors also impact the distribution of many livestock pathogens themselves. For instance, Rift Valley fever outbreaks in East Africa are known to be more intense during the times of drought or when there is an El Nino. Another example is that of helminths in Europe which have now spread further towards the poles, with higher survival rate and higher reproductive capacity (fecundity). Detailed long-term records of both livestock diseases and various agricultural interventions in Europe mean that demonstrating the role of climate change in the increased helminth burden in livestock is actually easier than attributing the impact of climate change on diseases which affect humans.

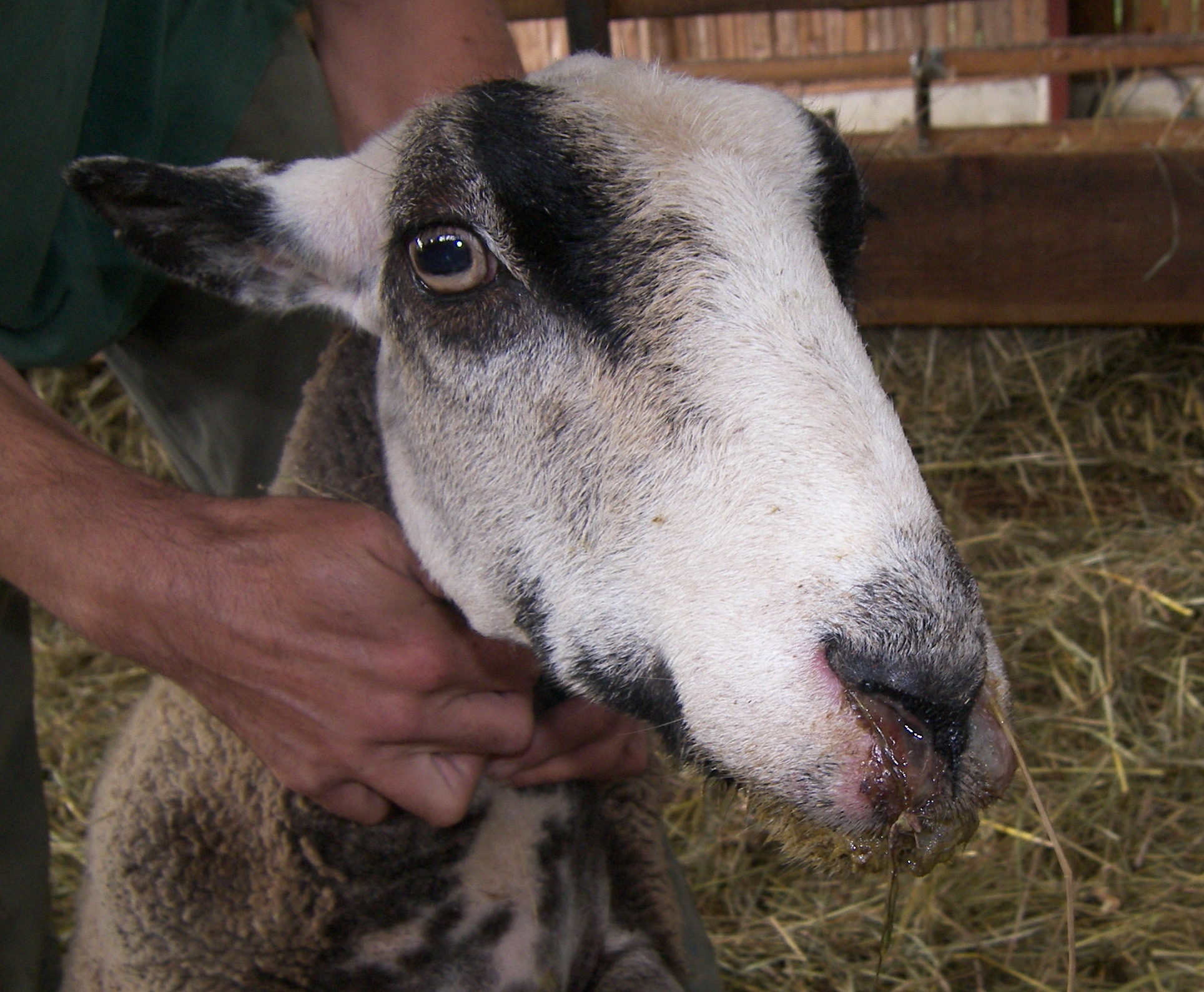
A sheep infected with bluetongue virus

Temperature increases are also likely to benefit Culicoides imicola, a species of midge which spreads bluetongue virus. Without a significant improvement in epidemiological control measures, what is currently considered an once-in-20-years outbreak of bluetongue would occur as frequently as once in five or seven years by midcentury under all but the most optimistic warming scenario. Rift Valley Fever outbreaks in East African livestock are also expected to increase. Ixodes ricinus, a tick which spreads pathogens like Lyme disease and tick-borne encephalitis, is predicted to become 5–7% more prevalent on livestock farms in Great Britain, depending on the extent of future climate change.

The impacts of climate change on leptospirosis are more complicated: its outbreaks are likely to worsen wherever flood risk increases, yet the increasing temperatures are projected to reduce its overall incidence in the Southeast Asia, particularly under the high-warming scenarios. Tsetse flies, the hosts of trypanosoma parasites, already appear to be losing habitat and thus affect a smaller area than before.

Tropical diseases will likely migrate and become endemic in many other ecosystems due to an increase in mosquito range. Other diseases carried by mosquitoes, such as Dirofilaria immitis (heartworm) which affects dogs, will be able to spread to new areas. Heartworm larvae also need temperatures above 14 °C for maturation within mosquitos. As climate change increases the temperature, heartworm will be able to expand the geographical range where it is able to mature and transmit.

== Responses ==
Global efforts focus on disease surveillance and research, adaptation strategies, and interdisciplinary collaboration to counter climate change's role in expanding vector-borne diseases like malaria and dengue. Organisations like the IPCC and WHO emphasise developing resilient health systems, early warning mechanisms, and vector control to mitigate risks from shifting pathogen ranges and extreme weather. Enacting policy that will reduce greenhouse gas emissions will mitigate climate change.

=== Vector control, prevention and treatment ===
Traditional vector-control measures like bed nets, indoor residual spraying, and improved water and sanitation remain central disease prevention strategies. Investment in vaccines and therapeutics for climate-sensitive diseases has increased, including malaria and dengue vaccine development and deployment. Climate considerations are increasingly incorporated into pandemic preparedness and research agendas, with emphasis on anticipating shifts in disease burden driven by warming temperatures and changing ecosystems.

=== Surveillance and research ===
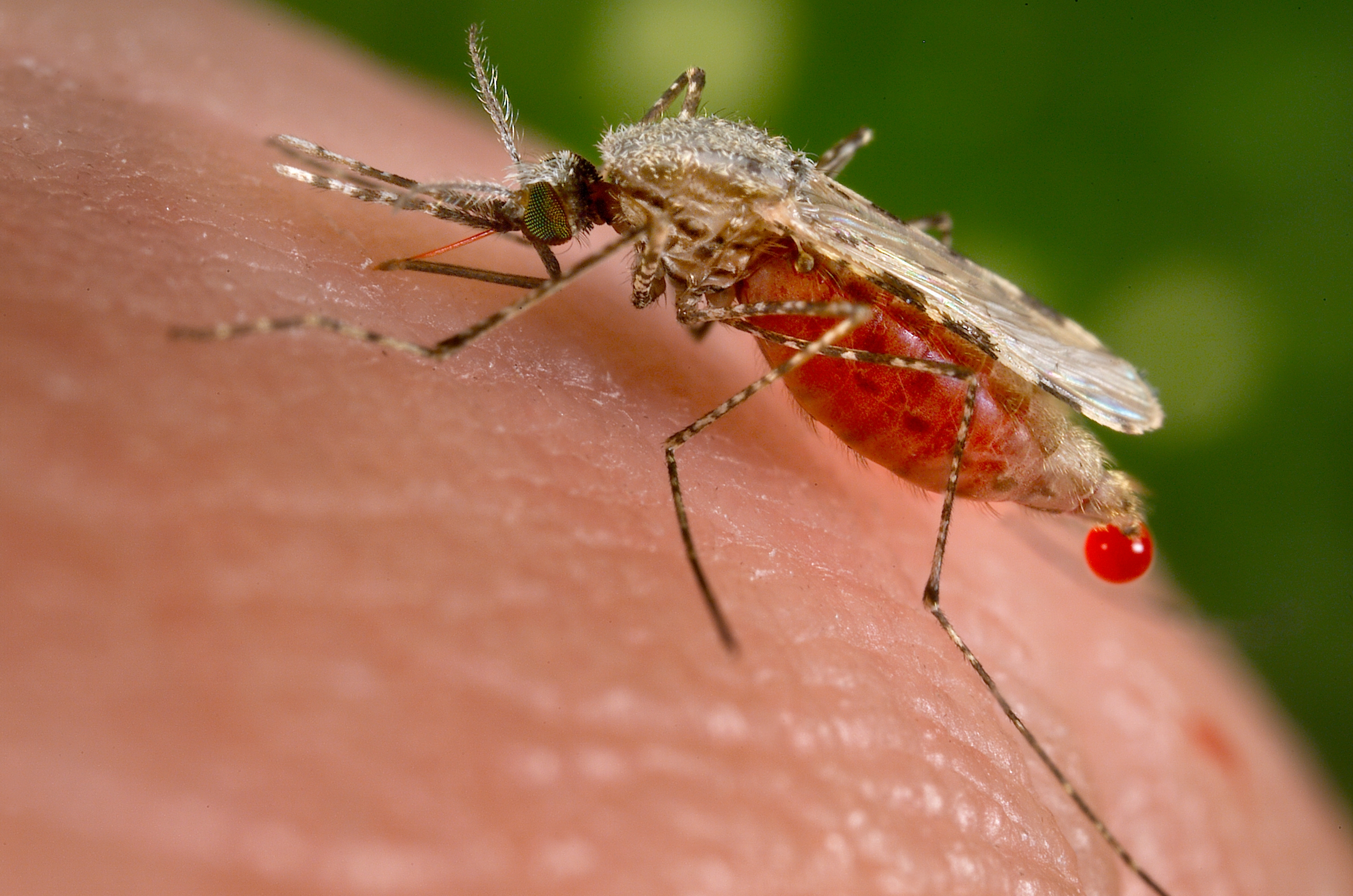
An Anopheles stephensi mosquito shortly after obtaining blood from a human (the droplet of blood is expelled as a surplus). This mosquito is a vector of malaria, and mosquito control is an effective way of reducing its incidence.

Significant progress has been achieved in surveillance systems, disease and vector control measures, vaccine development, diagnostic tests, and mathematical risk modeling/mapping in recent decades. However, a 2023 review found that existing climate change and infectious diseases research does not adequately represent different populations or regions of the world, and tends to focus on a narrow set of diseases. Due to these gaps, our understanding of how climate change impacts human health is incomplete.

Scientists conduct attribution studies to determine the degree to which climate change affects the spread of infectious diseases. There is also a need for scenario modeling which can help further our understanding of future climate change consequences on infectious disease rates. Disease surveillance systems are used to forecast outbreaks of climate-sensitive infectious diseases, enabling earlier public-health responses and targeted interventions. Governments should accurately model changes in vector populations as well as the burden of disease, educate the public on ways to mitigate infection and prepare health systems for the increasing disease load.

A tool that has been used to predict disease distribution trends is the Dynamic Mosquito Simulation Process (DyMSiM). DyMSiM uses epidemiological and entomological data and practices to model future mosquito distributions based upon climate conditions and mosquitos living in the area. This modeling technique helps identify the distribution of specific species of mosquito, some of which are more susceptible to viral infection than others.

=== Policy ===
The policy implications of climate change and infectious diseases fall into three categories:

1. Enacting policy that will reduce greenhouse gas emissions, thus mitigating climate change,
2. Adapting to problems that have already arisen, and will continue to develop, due to climate change,
3. Developing more accessible and affordable treatments for poor and marginalised patient populations.

Addressing all three of these areas is critical, and those in the poorest countries face the greatest burden. Additionally, when countries are forced to contend with a disease like malaria (for example), their prospects for self-sufficiency and prosperity are slowed. This contributes to continued and worsening global inequality.

Policies and implementation are required that will significantly increase investments in public health in developing countries. This achieves two goals, the first being better outcomes related to diseases like malaria in the affected area, and the second being an overall better health environment for populations.

As many climate-sensitive infectious diseases are zoonotic or vector-borne there has been increased adoption of the One Health approach which integrates human, animal, and environmental health. The United Nations Environment Programme states that: "The most fundamental way to protect ourselves from zoonotic diseases is to prevent destruction of nature. Where ecosystems are healthy and biodiverse, they are resilient, adaptable and help to regulate diseases." Governance responses need to incorporate more holistic and intersectoral understandings of the relationship between infectious diseases, climate change and environmental degradation, as in the concept of planetary health. These responses particularly require pro-active participation, leadership and ownership from indigenous communities and other local groups whose voices are often marginalised and sidelined in decision-making processes at the national, regional, international and global levels.

The challenges posed by infectious diseases require increased cross-border and transnational cooperation involving a wide range of relevant stakeholders, such as universities, pharmaceutical laboratories, non-governmental organisations and national governments. This cooperation should coordinate initiatives and policy approaches across different governance levels (from local to global) and develop transnational responses that reflect the transnational reality of climate-sensitive infectious diseases.

== See also ==
- Effects of climate change on human health
- Disease ecology
- Environmental health
- Planetary health
- Climate change and vector-borne diseases in Africa
