= María Dora Feliciangeli =

Venezuelan medical entomologist and academic

- Born: 1940; Borgomanero, Italy
- Died: 2017 (aged 76–77); Maracay, Venezuela
- Other name: María Dora Feliciangeli de Piñero
- Education: University of London
- Spouse: José Eulogio Piñero Hurtado
- Children: 3 Jose Eulogio Piñero Feliciangeli Laura Teresa Piñero Feliciangeli Carlos Eduardo Piñero Feliciangeli
- Parents: Zeferino Feliciangeli (father); Maria Cerutti (mother)
- Scientific career
- Fields: public health; tropical diseases; leishmaniasis
- Workplaces: University of Carabobo, Venezuela
- Thesis: Studies on the taxonomy, distribution and ecology of Phlebototomine Sandflies of Venezuela (Estudios sobre Taxonomía, distribución y ecología de Flebotominos de Venezuela) (1982)
- Doctoral advisor: Robert Killick-Kendrick

María Dora Feliciangeli (1940 - 2017) was Professor of Medical Entomology at the University of Carabobo, Venezuela, who worked on the transmission of tropical parasites especially American trypanosomiasis (Chagas disease) and leishmaniasis. She was Coordinator of the National Reference Center of Sandflies and the Medical Entomology Section.

== Education and personal life ==
Feliciangeli was the daughter of Zeferino Feliciangeli and Maria Cerutti. She was born in Borgomanero and was brought up in Rieti in central Italy.

She graduated with a degree in biological sciences from the Sapienza University of Rome in 1965 and moved to Venezuela with her husband. From 1977, she studied at the University of London and was awarded a PhD degree in 1982. In 1963, she married the Venezuelan José Piñero. They had three children together. She died in 2017.

== Career ==
Feliciangeli first worked with insects during her first degree in Rome (Dissertation, Experimental research on chemosterilizers for housefly control (Ricerche sperimentali sui chemosterilanti per il controllo di Musca domestica)). Her first post, from 1966 to 1972, was in the Rural Endemics Division of the School of Malariology and Environmental Sanitation in Venezuela. In 1972, she was appointed at the University of Carabobo, initially as an assistant to Witremundo Torrealba, the head of the Parasitology Department. By 1984 she had been promoted to be a full Professor. She retired from this academic post in 1991 to work as the Coordinator of the National Reference Center of Sandflies and the Medical Entomology Section, still associated with the University of Carabobo at Aragua as well as other national organisations. During her career, she was also involved in setting up and delivering many training courses in public health and medical entomology. She was a member of international committees and research collaborations in medical entomology.

Her research focused on the epidemiology, immunology and diagnostics of both the parasites and insect vectors for American trypanosomiasis and leishmaniasis. She led research that established two transmission cycles for cutaneous leishmaniasis with the sand fly Lutzomyia migonei as the insect vector. In addition, in 2001, she identified the species Lutzomyia psudolongipalpis within the L. longipalpis complex of at least eight species. She also led studies that demonstrated that infection with the pathogen Leishmania infantum had an adverse effect on the insect vectors.

In 2008 and 2012 she was a member of the World Health Organization and Pan American Health Organization expert committees on aspects of sand flies and American trypanosomiasis.

== Publications ==
Feliciangeli was the author or co-author of over 136 scientific publications and books. These included:

- M. Maroli, Feliciangeli M. D, Bichaud L, Charrel R. N. and Gradoni L. (2013) Phlebotomine sandflies and the spreading of leishmaniases and other diseases of public health concern. Med Vet Entomol. 27 123–47
- N. M. Rodriguez, De Guglielmo Z, Barrios M. A., Barrios R. M., Zerpa O and Feliciangeli MD. (2005) Genetic homogeneity within Leishmania (L.) infantum isolated from human and dogs: the relationship with the sandfly fauna distribution in endemic areas of Nueva Esparta State, Venezuela. Parasitology. 130 611–9.
- J. Arrivillaga, D.E. Norris, M.D. Feliciangeli and G.C. Lanzaro (2002) Phylogeography of the neotropical sand fly Lutzomyia longipalpis inferred from mitochondrial DNA sequences. Infection Genetics Evol. 2 83-95
- C. Jazzmin, Arrivillaga and M. Dora Feliciangeli (2001) Lutzomyia pseudolongipalpis: The first new species within the longipalpis (Diptera: Psychodidae: Phlebotominae) complex from La Rinconada, Curarigua, Lara State, Venezuela. J. Medical Entomology 38 783–790.
- CIPA Group [H. Bermudez (Bolivia), J. P. Dedet (Bolivia), A. L. Falcao (Brasil), M. D. Feliciangeli (Venezuela), E. Ferreira Rangel (Brasil), C. Ferro (Colombia), E.A.B. Galati (Brasil), E. L. Gomez (Ecuador), M. V. Herrero (Costa Rica), D. Hervas (Bolivia), J. Lebbe (France), A. Morales (Colombia), E. Ogusuku (Perú), E. Perez (Perú), I. Sherlock (Brasil), M. Torrez (Bolivia), R. Vignes (France), and M. Wolff (Colombia)] . (1991) Proposition for a standard description for phlebotomine sandflies. Parassitologia 33 (suppl. 1) 127–135.

== Awards and honours ==
In 1999 she was International Woman of the Year (1999) awarded by the University of Cambridge for her contributions to medical entomology and parasitology. She was president of the Venezuelan Parasitological Society. The Division of Medical Entomology Dra. María Dora Feliciangeli within the Venezuelan Incubadora Venezolana de la ciencia for multidisciplinary research into tropical disease is named after her.
