= Lutzomyia anthophora =

Scientific classification
- Kingdom: Animalia
- Phylum: Arthropoda
- Class: Insecta
- Order: Diptera
- Family: Psychodidae
- Genus: Lutzomyia
- Species: L. anthophora

Binomial name
- Lutzomyia anthophora (Addis, 1945)

Species of fly

Lutzomia anthrophora is a species of what is commonly known as the sandfly in the order Diptera and it is a common vector for Leishmania mexicana.

== Life cycle ==
Lutzomyia anthophora are holometabolous insects. They begin their life cycle as a dark elliptical egg. These eggs are generally laid in habitats such as rock crevices and trees. The eggs will hatch within twenty four hours and all eggs will hatch within the same time frame. The eggs then become larvae. These larvae will then feed on organic matter. The larvae will then progress through four larval instars before pupating. The Anthophora will pupate in dry climates. The males will generally mature faster than the females. Twenty four hours after eclosion, the male is able to fertilize a female while the female is able to copulate a couple hours after eclosion. Courtship involves rapid beating of the wings and release of the hormone. Copulation is not dependent on the nutrition of the fly and it lasts between two and five minutes. The female will then take a blood meal and lay her eggs.

== Nutrition ==
Lutzomyia anthophora feed on both carbohydrates and blood. Females that feed on carbohydrates fare better reproductively than those that do not. After feeding on these sugar solutions L. anthophora will wait twenty four hours before feeding again. Females will then feed on blood two to four days post eclosion. The main hosts for blood meals are small mammals such as wood-rats, white footed mice, rabbits, squirrel, and opossum. They also will feed on chickens if available. They tend to feed on the hairless regions of the ears.

== Morphology ==
Lutzomyia anthophora is identified by a few morphological characteristics. The most obvious is that the thorax is divided into three sections, the prothorax, the mesothorax, and the metathorax. Also, there are distinctive spines on their hind femoras. The posterior end of their cibarium contains two horizontal teeth and they have episternal setae. They also have one subterminal and one basal setae. The male and female are then differentiated by their own morphological characteristics. Males have parmere's with short strongly clubbed dorsal arms. The females have individual sperm ducts at least as long as the spermetheca. For more information follow the link to the dichotomous key.

== Habitat ==
Lutzomyia anthophora are found in Mexico and in the U.S. They tend to feed on small mammals and therefore can be found in these mammals' nests. Also, they tend to develop faster at higher temperatures.

== Importance ==
Lutzomyia anthophora bites are painful and can cause an allergic reaction. This also allows for the possibility of a secondary infection. Some studies have suggested they may be a vector of the bacteria Bartonella baciliformis. They are a known vector of Leishmania mexicana, which causes both cutaneous and diffuse cutaneous leishmaniasis.

== Sources ==
- Myers, P.; Espniosa, R.; Parr, C. S.; Jones, T.; Hammond, G. S.; Dewey, T. A. (2013). "Lutzomyia Anthophora". The Animal Diversity Web.
- Young, David; Duncan, Margo (1994). "Guide to the Identification and Geographic Distribution of Lutzomyia Sand Flies in Meixico, The West Indies, Central and South America (Diptera: Psychodidae)" (PDF). Memoirs of the Entomological Institute. 54. Associated Publishers: 260–266. Archived (PDF) from the original on November 3, 2013.
- Endris, R.G; Young, D.G; Butler, J.F (Nov 1984). "The Laboratory Biology of the Sand Fly Lutzomyia Anthophora (Diptera: Phsychodidae)" (PDF). J. Med Entomology. 21 (6): 656–664. doi:10.1093/jmedent/21.6.656. PMID 6502622.
