= Lutzomyia shannoni =

Scientific classification
- Kingdom: Animalia
- Phylum: Arthropoda
- Class: Insecta
- Order: Diptera
- Family: Psychodidae
- Genus: Lutzomyia
- Species: L. shannoni

Binomial name
- Lutzomyia shannoni (Dyar, 1929)

Synonyms
- Phlebotomus shannoni Dyar, 1929 Psathyromyia shannoni (Dyar, 1929)

Species of fly

Lutzomyia shannoni is a species of fly in the subfamily Phlebotominae, the phlebotomine sand flies. It is native to the Americas from the southeastern United States to northern Argentina. It has a disjunct distribution, and is only found in regions with suitable climates, habitat types, and host animals. It is well known as a vector of the vesicular stomatitis virus, which causes the disease vesicular stomatitis in animals, particularly livestock.

== Description ==
This insect belongs to the order Diptera, the true flies. The adult has wings less than 3 millimeters long, which are held erect. It has a narrow silvery-brown body and long legs. It is a sexually dimorphic species; the male has a slender abdomen with large terminalia at the end, and it lacks mandibles, while the female has mandibles and a wider abdomen. Only the female feeds on the blood of vertebrates, which requires mandibles. The abdomen becomes distended with the ingestion of a blood meal.

The dark brown eggs are elongated in shape, about 0.3 millimeters long by 0.1 millimeters wide. The newly emerged larva is up to about 0.7 millimeters in length, not counting the two long, thin caudal setae, which are twice the length of the body. The new larva is cream-colored with a light brown, well-developed head. By the second and third instars, there are four caudal setae. The fourth instar larva is around 5 millimeters long including the caudal setae, which are about as long as the body. The pupa resembles a butterfly chrysalis.

== Biology ==
The habitat of the fly is generally hardwood forest. It is nocturnal, resting during the day in dark, humid spots such as holes in trees or animal burrows. Oviposition and larval development take place in similar spots, often in crevices filled with organic debris. In the United States it is common in the hollows of tree species such as laurel oak (Quercus laurifolia) and southern live oak (Q. virginiana).

The male and female feed on plant juices such as nectar. The female feeds on blood for the maturation of its ovarian follicles and production of fertile eggs, but autogeny has been demonstrated for Florida females. Hosts include many mammals, including white-tailed deer, horses, donkeys, mules, cattle, swine, raccoons, cats, dogs, rodents, and humans. In Panama it commonly feeds on sloths. Humans experience bites from the fly at night, when it is active.

The adult fly lives 4 to 15 days, and the total egg-to-adult life cycle is about 36 to 74 days long.

The wings of the fly are functional but it is a weak flyer, going no more than half a kilometer at a time.

== As a vector ==
The bite of the female fly transmits the vesicular stomatitis virus in mammals. The disease in cattle and pigs is impossible to distinguish from foot-and-mouth disease. The virus causes blistering lesions of the mouth, nose, hooves, and teats. The blisters break and leave painful raw tissue. Animals may refuse food and water and become lame. They experience weight loss and dairy cattle produce less milk. Humans can be infected with the virus and experience flu-like symptoms and occasionally oral blisters and lymphadenopathy in the neck.

One well-studied vesicular stomatitis virus enzootic involving this fly is on Ossabaw Island off the coast of Georgia in the United States. The fly feeds on feral Ossabaw Island Hogs and spreads the virus widely, though clinical disease is rare.

The female can transmit the virus to its offspring via its ovaries, so the juvenile flies can emerge already carrying the pathogen. The species can also harbor various Leishmania protozoans, including Leishmania mexicana and L. panamensis. It is a suspected vector of Leishmania infantum and L. brasiliensis, pathogens that cause leishmaniasis.
