= Maria Cristina Ferro =

Colombian microbiologist (1947–2015)

Maria Cristina Ferro de Carrasquilla
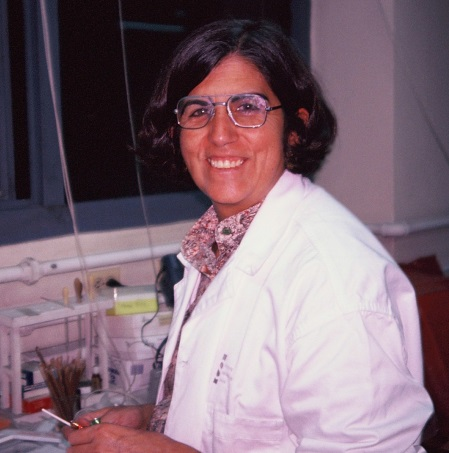
- Born: May 6, 1947; Ipiales, Nariño (Colombia)
- Died: July 29, 2015 (aged 68); Bogota (Colombia)
- Education: Universidad de los Andes
- Spouse: Fernando Carrasquilla
- Children: German Carrasquilla and Maria Cristina Carrasquilla
- Scientific career
- Fields: Tropical medicine, Leishmaniasis, Parasitology, Medical Entomology, Infectious Diseases
- Thesis: Quantitative Studies in the Xenodiagnosis of Trypanososma (Schizotrypanum) cruzi in a Primate (Macacca mullatta) with first-instar Triatomines (Rhodnius prolixus, Panstrongylus megistus and Triatoma infestans) (1976)

Maria Cristina Ferro de Carrasquilla (1947–2015) was a Colombian microbiologist and Leishmaniasis researcher who worked for more than forty years at the National Health Institute of Colombia. Most of her research was focused on sandflies (Phlebotominae subfamily), which are Leishmaniasis vectors, contributing with the description of three new species: Lutzomyia torvida, Lutzomyia falcata, and Lutzomyia tolimensis. Given her research contributions, a sandfly species was named after her: Lutzomyia ferroae (Young & Morales 1987). Ferro also worked with Venezuelan equine encephalitis virus and received the Emeritus Researcher award from the National Health Institute of Colombia in 2007.

== Biography ==
Ferro obtained a bachelor's degree in Microbiology at University of Los Andes in Bogota in 1969 and started working in the Entomology laboratory at the National Health Institute of Colombia, focusing on Leishmaniasis vectors with the entomologists Ernesto Osorno Mesa, Fenita Muñoz de Osorno, and Alberto Morales Alarcon. Phlebotominae taxonomy, biology and ecology was the core of her research studies. During 1975–1976, she did a Master of Science in Parasitology at the London School of Hygiene and Tropical Medicine with British Council fellowship. Afterwards, she returned to the Entomology laboratory at the National Health Institute of Colombia and from 1994 to 2005, she was the coordinator. In 2006, she became principal researcher of several projects and editor of the National Health Institute journal: Biomedica. In 2007, Ferro was recognized as Emeritus Researcher for her research contributions in Leishmaniasis and Venezuelan equine encephalitis virus in the medical entomology field.

== Research field ==
Ferro's research was focused on the study of Leishmaniasis and Venezuelan equine encephalitis virus vectors. She described three new species of phlebotomines: Lutzomyia torvida., Lutzomyia falcata, and Lutzomyia tolimensis. Ferro contributed with new sandfly species records in Colombia, increasing the knowledge on Phlebotominae geographical distribution, biology and genetics. Additionally, Ferro isolated Leishmania species and new phlebotomines viruses, and investigated the incrimination, vectorial capacity, environmental anad ecological factors associated with Leishmaniasis transmission. A new phlebotomine species was named after her, Lutzomyia ferroae, due to her research contributions.

== Awards ==
- Colciencias 1995 Research Award - The Entolomology laboratory was recognized as an excellence A group category
- Ernesto Osorno Mesa Award - Entomological Colombian Society Conference
- Senior Researcher - Colciencias
- Honorable Mention in the Health and Medical Sciences category
- Colombian Emeritus Researcher in 2014 - Colciencias

== Selected publications ==
During her scientific career, Ferro published more than one hundred scientific papers and four book chapters, and advised several undergraduate and graduate research projects. To date, her most cited publications are:

- Weaver, S. C., Ferro, C., Barrera, R., Boshell, J., & Navarro, J. C. (2004). Venezuelan equine encephalitis. Annual Reviews in Entomology, 49(1), 141–174.
- Travi, B. L., Tabares, C. J., Cadena, H., Ferro, C., & Osorio, Y. (2001). Canine visceral leishmaniasis in Colombia: relationship between clinical and parasitologic status and infectivity for sand flies. The American journal of tropical medicine and hygiene, 64(3), 119–124.
- Morrison, A. C., Ferro, C., Morales, A., Tesh, R. B., & Wilson, M. L. (1993). Dispersal of the sand fly Lutzomyia longipalpis (Diptera: Psychodidae) at an endemic focus of visceral leishmaniasis in Colombia. Journal of medical entomology, 30(2), 427–435.
- Corredor, A., Gallego, J. F., Tesh, R. B., Morales, A., de Carrasquilla, C. F., Young, D. G., ... & Pelaez, D. (1989). Epidemiology of visceral leishmaniasis in Colombia. The American journal of tropical medicine and hygiene, 40(5), 480–486.
- Morrison, A. C., Ferro, C., & Tesh, R. B. (1993). Host preferences of the sand fly Lutzomyia longipalpis at an endemic focus of American visceral leishmaniasis in Colombia. The American journal of tropical medicine and hygiene, 49(1), 68–75.
- Corredor, A., Kreutzer, R. D., Tesh, R. B., Boshell, J., Palau, M. T., Caceres, E., ... & Hernandez, C. A. (1990). Distribution and etiology of leishmaniasis in Colombia. The American journal of tropical medicine and hygiene, 42(3), 206–214.
- Aguilar, P. V., Estrada-Franco, J. G., Navarro-Lopez, R., Ferro, C., Haddow, A. D., & Weaver, S. C. (2011). Endemic Venezuelan equine encephalitis in the Americas: hidden under the dengue umbrella. Future virology, 6(6), 721–740.
