= Robert Killick-Kendrick =

British parasitologist (1929–2011)

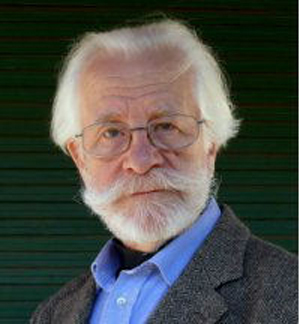
- Born: 20 June 1929; Hampton, United Kingdom
- Died: 22 October 2011 (aged 82); Ganges, France
- Awards: Sir Rickard Christophers Medal from the Royal Society of Tropical Medicine and Hygiene (1991)
- Scientific career
- Fields: Parasitology
- Doctoral students: María Dora Feliciangeli

Robert Killick-Kendrick (20 June 1929 – 22 October 2011) was a British parasitologist with interests in the vectors of infectious diseases, in particular phlebotomine sandflies. His work on malaria, trypanosomiasis, leishmaniasis and other parasitological infections are numerous and diverse. He published more than 300 articles and scientific contributions.

== Education ==
- Master of Philosophy (MPhil)
- 1972 - Doctorate (PhD)
- 1978 - Doctor of Science (DSc) from the University of London for his work in parasitology
- DIC
- FIMLS
- (Hon) FRES
- FSB
- CBiol (Chartered Biologist)

== Career ==
Killick-Kendrick was born in Hampton, Middlesex, and educated at Woking Grammar School. He left at 16, worked for a year in the Ministry of Agriculture and Fisheries in Weybridge, then spent two years in the Royal Army Medical Corps.

In 1949, he started his career in research as a laboratory assistant at the London School of Hygiene and Tropical Medicine. From 1955 he worked for eight years in Nigeria investigating trypanosome infections in humans as well as cattle. He once trekked 415 miles (664 km) over 28 days, accompanied by a colleague and 28 cattle, to determine where the cattle became infected with trypanosomes. He returned to the London School in 1963 to continue research on malaria parasites with Cyril Garnham and others. After Garnham's retirement in 1968, he followed him to Imperial College London, where their work on malaria continued.

In 1972, he began investigating leishmaniasis and its vectors sandflies. For several years he lived in Cévennes.

In 1988, Killick-Kendrick was named as a member of the World Health Organization Expert Committee on Leishmaniasis where he was involved in the creation of the 1990 Technical Report Series on the Control of Leishmaniasis, as well as contributed to the 2010 Expert Committee meeting on leishmaniasis.

== Honours ==
{

- Honorary Member of the Royal Entomological Society (in 2005)
- Honorary Member of the Società Italiana di Parassitologia (in 1991)
- Member of the American Society of Tropical Medicine and Hygiene
- Member of the Académie des Hauts Cantons (in 2008)
- Honorary Member of the Turkish Society for Parasitology (in 2011)

For his contributions to tropical medicine, Killick-Kendrick received:

- the Sir Rickard Christophers Medal from the Royal Society of Tropical Medicine and Hygiene (in 1991)
- the Emile Brumpt International Prize (in 2007)

== Public engagements ==
Killick-Kendrick acted as the narrator for a series of videos produced by Scalibor entitled "What's biting my dog?" to explain which parasites affect dogs, and how this can be prevented.

== See also ==
- Leishmaniasis
- Parasitology
- Malaria
- Phlebotomus
