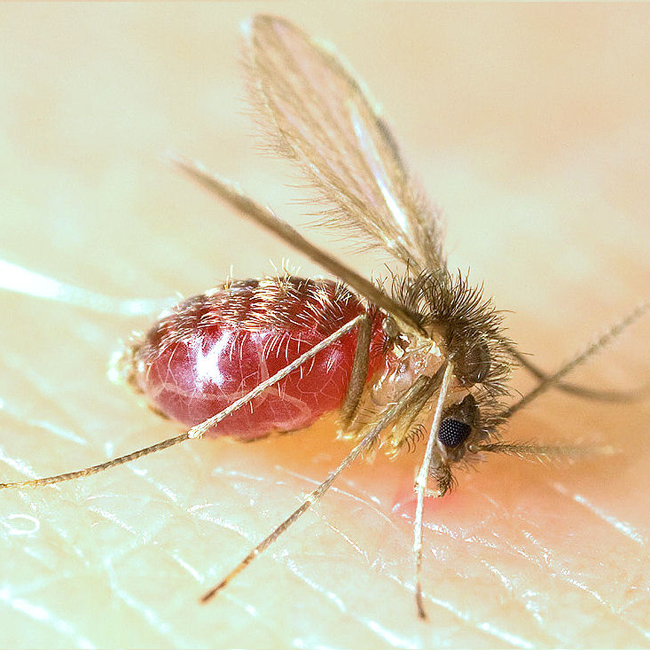

Scientific classification
- Kingdom: Animalia
- Phylum: Arthropoda
- Clade: Pancrustacea
- Class: Insecta
- Order: Diptera
- Family: Psychodidae
- Genus: Lutzomyia
- Species: L. longipalpis

Binomial name
- Lutzomyia longipalpis (Lutz & Neiva, 1912)

= Lutzomyia longipalpis =

Species of fly

Lutzomyia longipalpis (L. longipalpis) is a species complex of sandfly belonging to the family Psychodidae. This species is primarily present in Central and South America, but has also appeared in Mexico. There have been reports of L. longipalpis as far south as Argentina, as they are found in a wide variety of ecological conditions. Both males and females feed on sugars from plants and aphids, but only adult females feed on the blood of other animals. The species has recently begun appearing in urban areas throughout Brazil, and serves as a key vessel for the propagation of the parasite Leishmania infantum. The presence of these flies appears to be strongly correlated to the presence of domestic chickens in Latin America. The first major urban outbreak of the lethal Visceral leishmanias epidemic was detected in Teresina, Piauí State in the early 1980s following a massive planting of acacias.

== History of taxonomy ==
L. longipalpis has only recently (2017) been accepted as a complex of sibling species as opposed to a heterogeneous species. Earlier on, there were many doubts that L. longipalpis constituted a single species due to its wide geographic distribution over Latin America. Populations of L. longipalpis and sand flies studied within Brazil showed morphological differences. Males in the northern region of Brazil had only one pair of pale tergal spots, while those in the northeastern region of Brazil had two pairs. Thus, it was hypothesized that the species might be further broken down into two different forms. This hypothesis was confirmed through insemination experiments as males from one form of the species were unable to successfully mate with females of the other form.

Since then, several studies within Brazil have been conducted to support the hypothesis that L. longipalpis is a species complex. Studies involving isoenzyme electrophoresis, genetic polymorphism assessments of DNA and mRNA, cytogenetics, analysis studies of nucleotide variation in the NADH dehydrogenase subunit 4, as well as assessments of other mitochondrial genes are all part of mounting evidence supporting the species complex hypothesis. In 2001, Lutzomyia psudolongipalpis was characterised by María Dora Feliciangeli's research group as one of the species within the complex. Subsequent research has indicated that there may be eight distinct species within the complex.

== Habitat ==
Lutzomyia longipalpis is the most abundant species of sandfly occupying northeastern Brazil, representing 97.9% of all phlebotomine sand flies present there. This species is followed in descending order of abundance by L. evandroi, L. lenti, and L. sallesi. These flies are most prevalent near animal shelters, such as chicken coops and corrals. They can also be found in houses, but only in small quantities.

== Physiology ==
Lutzomyia longipalpis possess the enzyme trypsin in their midgut, which is responsible for the primary digestion of proteins in females. Trypsin activity is naturally decreased by 36% to 46% during the first and second days after the second gonadotrophic cycle. However, the presence of the Leishmania parasite within the sandfly is associated with even lower levels of activity of the protease enzyme. This modulation in trypsin activity after a sandfly's second blood meal is suspected to produce a conducive physiological environment for Leishmania infections, which is exploited by the parasite. Transmission and development of the disease are consequently dependent upon the sandfly's access to multiple blood meals. Dogs that have been treated with the LJM17 salivary protein from L. longipalpis presented a more powerful cellular immune response in response to infection. Higher levels of proinflammatory cytokines and chemokines were detected with a specific increase in the production of IFN-γ and IL-10, indicating a stronger and longer-lasting immune response to the disease antigen. The strong immune reaction in response to exposure to the salivary protein indicates the protein's potential use in the field as a treatment to vaccinate dogs who then become immune to the disease.

=== Midgut ===
The acidity of the sandfly midgut is maintained at a stable homeostatic pH level of ~6, even in the presence of strong buffer solutions. However, the proper digestion of blood requires an alkaline pH of 8.15 in the abdominal midgut for proteases like trypsin to function properly. Lutzomyia longipalpis females contain the ability to abruptly alter their physiology by switching the internal environment of the abdominal midgut from acidic to alkaline. The presence of undigested proteins serves as the acting stimulus to drive female sand flies to undergo a shift in abdominal midgut pH. Even though the pH of the abdominal midgut is alkaline, carbohydrate digestion is able to function efficiently due to the maintenance of the acidic pH of the thoracic midgut.

== Diet ==
Humans are an important blood source for these flies, but they are also known to feed on dog, chicken, and armadillo blood. Blood from horses, guinea pigs, and humans provide the best nutrients to support L. longipalpis females in their reproduction processes. Interestingly, sand flies do not feed on the blood from cats or the opossums Monodelphis domestica. Most scientific evidence points towards L. longipalpis being eclectic feeders, signifying that they acquire blood from multiple sources.

=== Dangers of multiple blood meals ===
Although the feeding of blood is important for the maturation of oocytes, too many blood meals can also negatively impact the lifespan of females. Lutzomyia longipalpis, like most other blood-sucking organisms, ingest large amounts of blood in a single meal. A female sandfly consumes between three and ten times its body weight in one feeding. Blood is rich in proteins, consisting mainly of hemoglobin (Hb), which accounts for approximately 60% of the blood protein content. The digestion of hemoglobin results in the release of high levels of the prosthetic group heme. Heme acts as a toxic molecule that can generate oxygen-reactive species and bypass membranes due to its high permeability. Elevated levels of heme in female L. longipalpis are suspected to be the cause of increased mortality for females that have ingested multiple blood meals.

== Pathogenesis ==
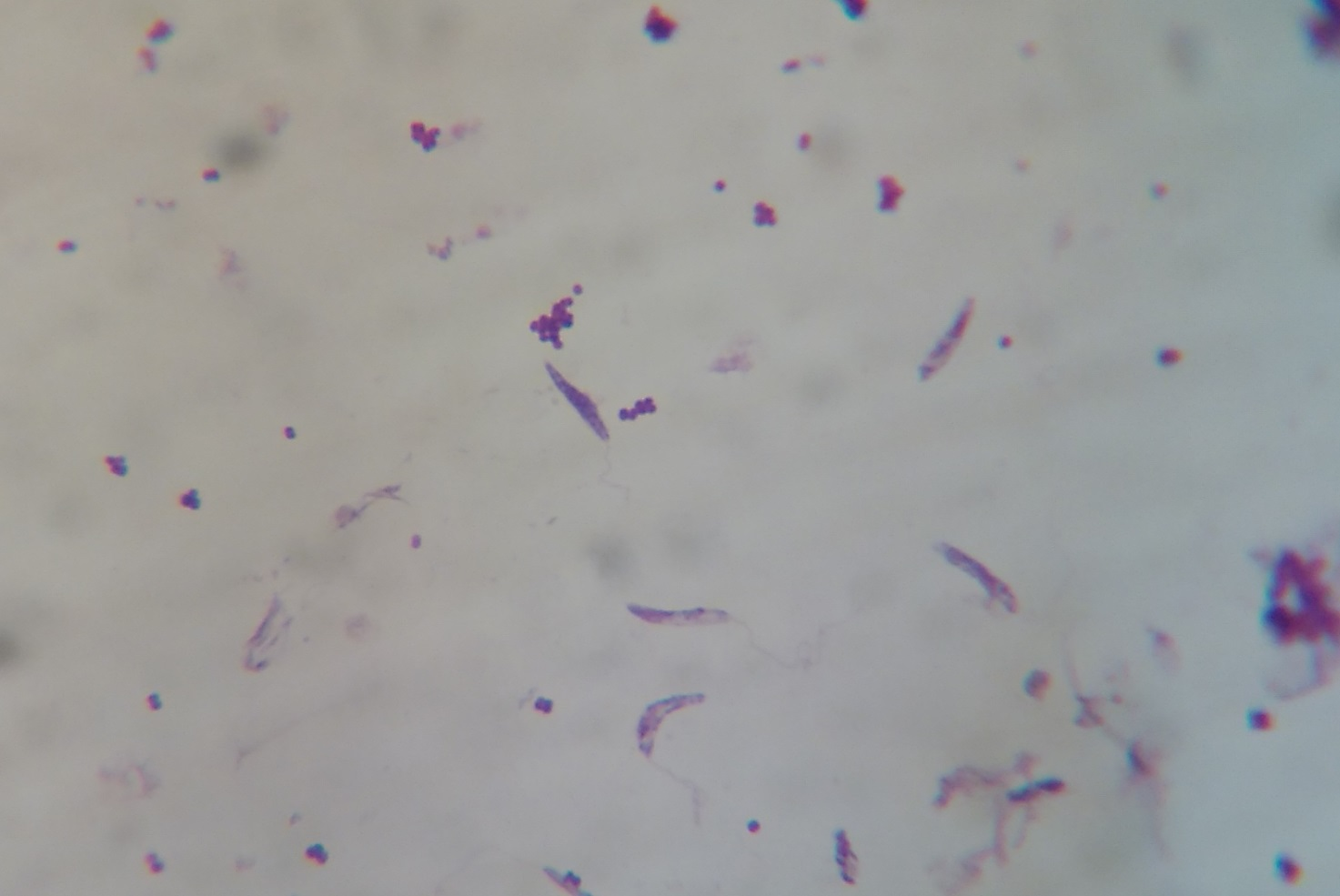
Leishmania infantum in a bone marrow smear.

Lutzomyia longipalpis plays a primary role in the transmission of Leishmania infantum throughout several countries in South America. This parasite directly causes visceral leishmaniasis, which is a severe disease that affects internal organs, including the spleen, liver, and bone marrow. The parasitic pathogen is transmitted through the bite of a sandfly, and although humans can be infected, humans cannot spread the disease further. Instead, domestic dogs are the primary amplification host for the parasite.

=== Immune response ===
The direct bite of an infected sandfly during blood feeding allows for the parasitic transmission of visceral leishmaniasis from Lututzomyia longipalpis to the vertebrate host. The sandfly saliva contains potent physiological compounds that cause anticoagulant, vasodilating, and anti-inflammatory activity, which influences the immune response of the host vertebrate. Dogs that have been treated with the LJM17 salivary protein from L. longipalpis presented a more powerful cellular immune response in response to infection. Higher levels of proinflammatory cytokines and chemokines were detected with a specific increase in the production of IFN-γ and IL-10, indicating a stronger and longer-lasting immune response to the disease antigen. The strong immune reaction in response to exposure to the salivary protein indicates the protein's potential use in the field as a treatment to vaccinate dogs who then become immune to the disease.

=== Microbiome of midgut ===
For transmission of Leishmania to occur, it must first undergo development into an infective promastigote. This crucial step of development occurs in the midgut of Lutzomyia longipalpis. The microbiome of the midgut is a critical factor that influences the growth of the pathogen into its infective state. Sucrose-rich diets result in highly diverse, stable bacterial microbiomes. Meanwhile, blood-feeding diets cause a markable decrease in microbial richness, but this decrease is eventually corrected after a short period of time. Sandflies infected with Leishmania experience a progressive decline in the bacterial diversity of the midgut. Interestingly, the perturbation of the midgut microbiome due to the introduction of antibiotics causes the sand flies to become unable to support the parasitic growth of the pathogen. This highlights the bacterial microbiome of the L. longipalpis midgut as another area of interest that can be explored to control the disease.

== Interactions with domestic chicken ==
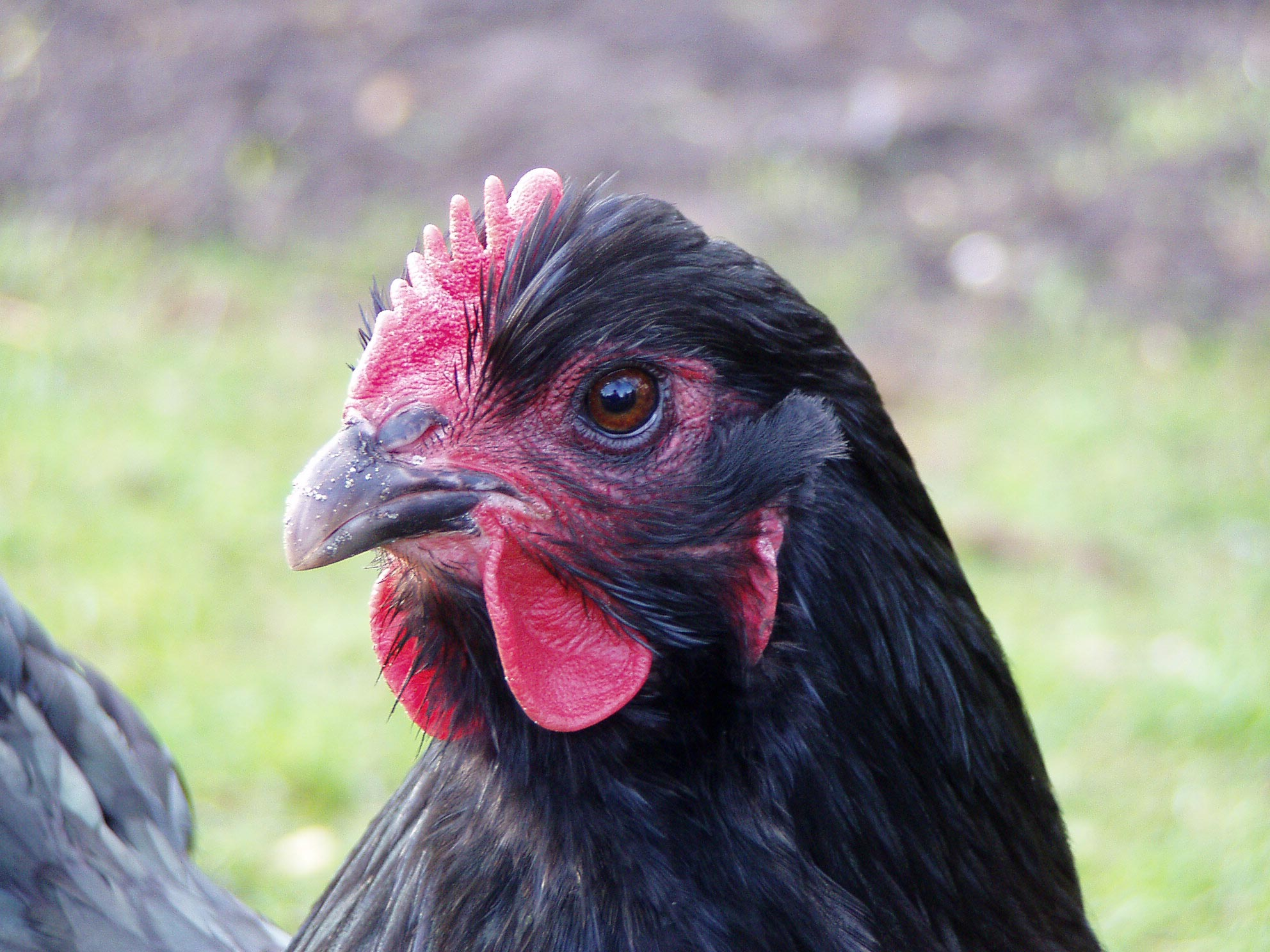
Latin American chicken.

One study within Bahia, Brazil discovered that people with chicken coops in their homes were 4.21 times more likely to contract zoonotic visceral leishmaniasis (ZVL) compared to those who did not have chicken coops. However, other studies have not been able to verify this significant correlation. Nevertheless, it is well known that L. longipalpis are highly abundant near chicken coops, but the relationship between chicken raising and ZVL is not fully understood because chickens are unable to harbor infections of the parasite. Although chickens cannot serve as host reservoirs for the disease, chickens may play a crucial role in sustaining populations of the sandfly vector for the disease, as well as attracting other mammals, such as dogs, for the parasite to potentially infect.

=== Theories of explanation ===
One factor possibly contributing to the high L. longipalpis presence near chickens is the feeding of sand flies on chicken blood. Chickens are dormant at night, which leave large areas of exposed skin susceptible to fly feeding. The epidermis of chickens is relatively thin (~0.02 mm), which allows the sandfly to more easily pierce the skin to acquire the blood nutrients.

From an evolutionary standpoint, one theory proposes that male blood-sucking L. longipalpis may have gained a significant mating advantage by staying near chickens and waiting for females to arrive and feed. At any given moment, the number of male flies far outweighs the number of female flies present on a chicken host, which is similar in size to their mating ritual of courtship. Thus, chickens may play a vital role as a hub for the propagation of the fly species.

Another theory is that in general, many of these people who raise chickens in chicken coops tend to also raise other animals, such as pigs and livestock, in their yards. Dogs are commonly used as security to guard the chickens, which presents a convenient group of amplification hosts for the parasite within a concentrated area.

== Life history ==
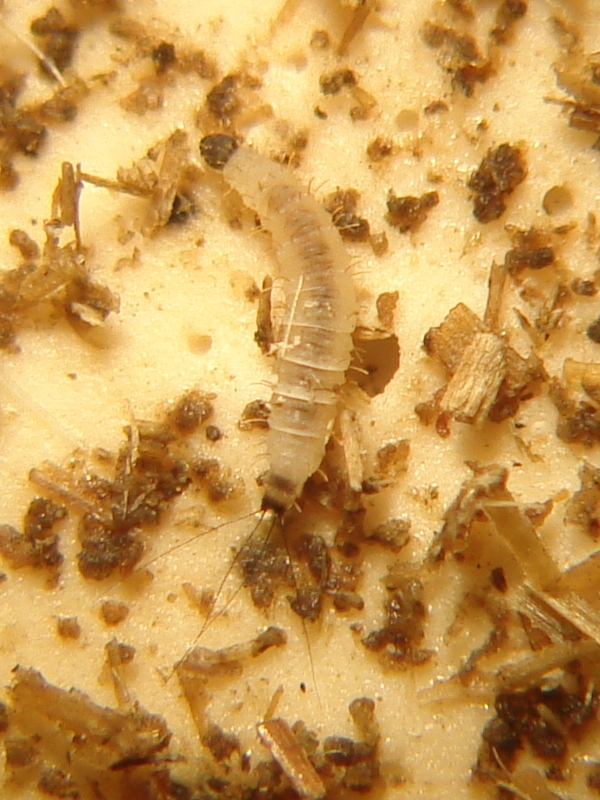
Lutzomyia longipalpis larva.

The total developmental time for each generation lasts about 6–7 weeks. L. longipalpis follow a general life cycle common to sand flies consisting of eggs, larvae, and pupae, and winged adults. After the female acquires a blood meal, oviposition occurs within 5–9 days. After eggs are laid, they require 4–9 days to grow before they hatch. Larvae develop in 9–24 days, while pupae then develop in approximately 10 days. Immature stages involve growth in the ground, and soil traps have identified chicken sheds as the optimal breeding site for L. longipalpis larvae. Implications for the residence of these larvae suggest that larval control at chicken sheds could aid in control of adult flies and thus, disease pathogenesis with regards to L. infantum.

=== Development ===
After emergence from pupae, both male and female L. longipalpis initially feed on sugars from plants and aphids, but as development occurs, only adult females are hematophagous. Both genders will consume sugar-rich foods, such as nectar, honey dew, and plant sap, but females will feed on a wide range of vertebrates, including dogs, chickens, horses, and humans. The blood meal serves as an essential step for the maturation of the ovaries. After consuming a fulfilling amount of blood, the female starts its digestion, which requires three to four days. Females are anautogenous insects, so egg development only occurs after a blood meal. Oviposition begins six days after the blood meal and generally lasts for six days. However, a second blood feed is required to start a new cycle of digestion and oviposition.

== Mating ==
This species has an overall sex ratio of 2:1 for males to females, so males outnumber females. Males of the species complex are attracted to vertebrate host odors called kairomones and collectively form nocturnal aggregations called leks near the hosts. Females, unlike males, are haematophagous and are attracted to the lek both by the kairomones secreted from the host, as well as the sex pheromones secreted by the males.

=== Males ===
Males possess glands that secrete pheromones to attract females that can act over a distance of 240 cm. After birth, pheromone biosynthesis occurs after 12 hours, and it takes males 24 hours to become sexually mature. Male courtship behavior involves the aggregation of males who compete with one another by producing sex pheromones. Males encircle females and use the vibrating movement and flapping of their wings to produce audible sounds. These pre-mating signaling frequencies resemble a song that the males use to attract and court the females.

== Ecology ==
Several abiotic factors, such as temperature, rainfall, and humidity have been shown to influence the population density size of these sand flies. Rainfall is the most influential variable accounting for population size as documented increases in population size occur during the rainy months and directly after the rainy period. Higher relative humidity is significantly correlated with higher population sizes of the species, as well.

=== Flora ===
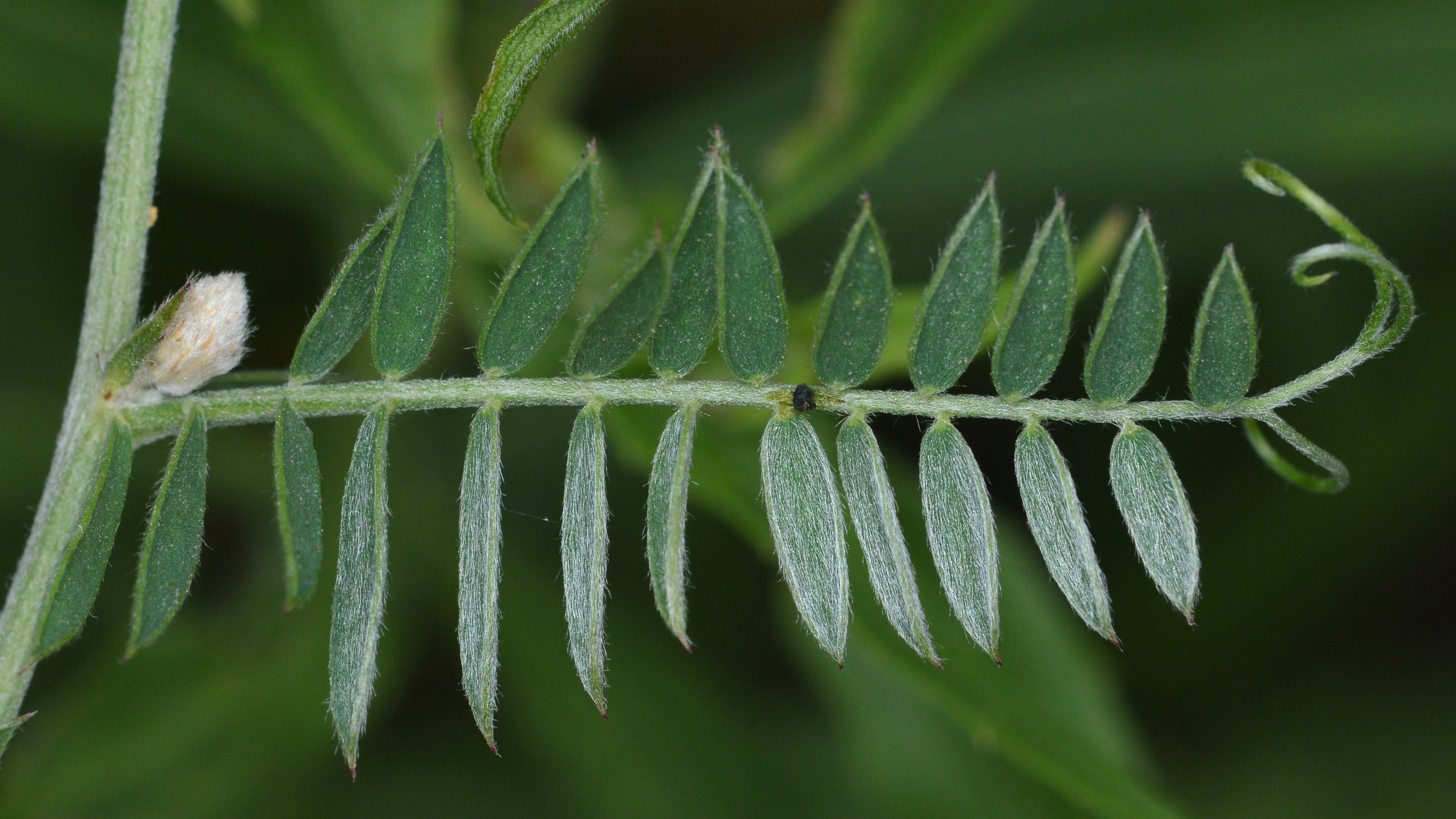
Legume plant.

Because the diversity and quantity of plant wildlife are largely associated with the quality and availability of resources that insects can utilize, acacias have been targeted as a point of interest in their involvement with L. longipalpis and the propagation of its disease. Acacia trees attract the presence of these sand flies due to their ability to provide protection from predators, allowing the flies to proliferate. Sand flies also require sugar from plants as their energy source. Plants from the family Fabaceae are preferentially selected for in the feeding diet of L. longipalpis, while other trees that may be more abundant, such as the Anacardiacea and Meliaceae families are not preferred by the fly species. The Fabaceae family is commonly known as legumes and contain a mixture of carbohydrates ranging from simple sugars to complex heteropolysaccharides. The sandfly species are attracted to the specific carbohydrate composition of this plant species over others.
