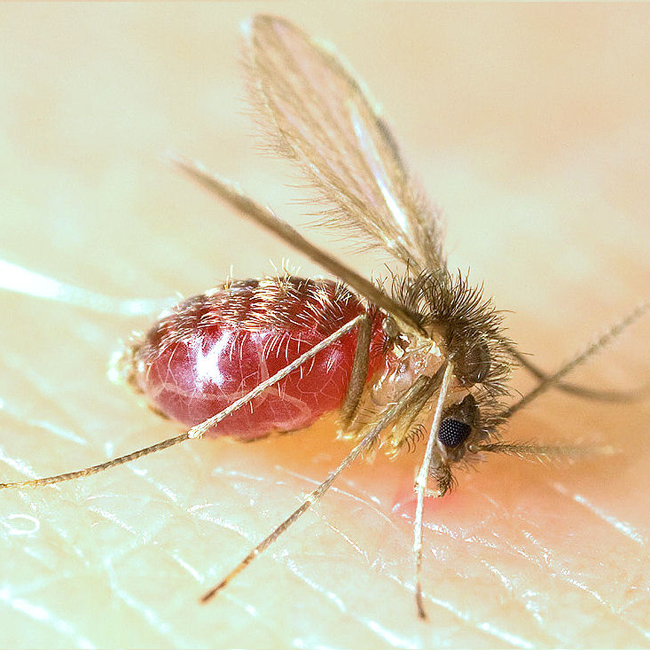
- Lutzomyia longipalpis taking a blood meal

Scientific classification
- Kingdom: Animalia
- Phylum: Arthropoda
- Class: Insecta
- Order: Diptera
- Family: Psychodidae
- Subfamily: Phlebotominae
- Genus: Lutzomyia; França, 1924

Synonyms
- Fransaia Dyar & Nuñez Tovar, 1927; Lutziola Strand, 1932

= Lutzomyia =

Lutzomyia Temporal range: Burdigalian - Recent

Genus of flies

Lutzomyia is a genus of phlebotomine sand flies consisting of nearly 400 species, at least 33 of which have medical importance as vectors of human disease. Species of the genus Lutzomyia are found only in the New World, distributed in southern areas of the Nearctic and throughout the Neotropical realm. Lutzomyia is one of the two genera of the subfamily Phlebotominae to transmit the Leishmania parasite, with the other being Phlebotomus, found only in the Old World. Lutzomyia sand flies also serve as vectors for the bacterial Carrion's disease and a number of arboviruses.

== Evolution ==
The genus, named after Adolfo Lutz, is known from the extinct Burdigalian (20–15 mya) species Lutzomyia adiketis found as a fossil in Dominican amber on the island of Hispaniola. It is thought that species in the genus Lutzomyia all originated in the lowland forests to the east of the Andes mountain range, and that their radiation throughout the Neotropics was sparked by dry periods of the Pleistocene, driving colonisation further north and west to areas of higher humidity and leading to reproductive isolation.

== Systematics ==
The classification of species within the genus Lutzomyia is largely unresolved, and relies on often controversial divisions based on morphological taxonomic characters. Such analyses can suffer from polymorphisms within a species, the existence of cryptic species and the frequent lack of distinct morphological characters amongst females. Research has begun in an attempt to resolve evolutionary relationships between species in the genus, using molecular methods to create phylogenies based on ribosomal DNA sequences.

=== Species ===
- †Lutzomyia adiketis
- Lutzomyia amazonensis
- Lutzomyia anthophora
- Lutzomyia aragaoi
- Lutzomyia cruzi
- Lutzomyia intermedia
- Lutzomyia longipalpis
- Lutzomyia migonei
- Lutzomyia whitmani
- Lutzomyia shannoni
- Lutzomyia tejadai
- Lutzomyia verrucarum
- Lutzomyia vexator

== Biology ==
The Lutzomyia sand flies are small, biting insects with a body length of up to only 3 mm. They are hairy insects with their colour ranging from a near-white to near-black.

=== Life stages ===
Life stage	Characteristic features
Eggs	Female Lutzomyia sand flies will typically lay small batches of around 40-70 dark, elliptical eggs within a moist microhabitat. For most species, this will require the female to take a bloodmeal prior to oviposition. However, there are some species of the genus which are able to lay the first batch of eggs without a bloodmeal.
Larvae	Larval development of the Lutzomyia sand fly involves at least 18 days of development through four instars, before reaching maturity. Following hatching, the first instar larva will feed on any readily available organic matter. Development through the four instars produces a small, mature larva which is caterpillar-like in appearance. This larva will then aim to find a slightly drier environment in which to pupate.
Pupae	The pupal stage of development typically involves between 7 and 12 days of resting prior to emergence of the adults. It is generally the case that adult males emerge first.
Adults	Emergence of adult Lutzomyia sand flies occurs and, in males, is followed by sexual maturation within 24 hours. This sexual maturation is marked by the 180° rotation of the male's external genitalia. Adult males will then seek to mate, generally by using pheromones to find a resting site with potential mates. Males exhibit courtship behaviour, such as by varying wing beat patterns.

=== Feeding ===
Only the female Lutzomyia sand flies are blood-feeding, requiring the bloodmeal to provide the nutrients for the maturation of eggs. Therefore, it is only the females who have medical importance as vectors of disease. Both males and females require carbohydrate food as adults, the source of which remains unclear.

The most medically important species for human disease transmission are those which predominantly favour humans as a source of bloodmeal. These species are known as anthropophillic and tend to feed at around dusk. However, there are examples of anthropophillic species that will attack in the daytime. The majority of anthropohillic Lutzomyia species in the Americas are exophillic, which means that they favour biting outside of homes.

=== Resting ===
The resting behaviour of Lutzomyia sand flies, like many other aspects of their biology, is important to understand for targeted, vector-based control methods to reduce transmission of Leishmaniasis. For example, residual spraying of insecticides can be targeted at known resting sites to increase effectiveness. Lutzomyia sand flies generally rest outdoors, with the type of resting site varying between species and in response to the seasons and the availability of particular microhabitats. The largest resting microhabitat is the forest floor, but sand flies will also rest in a variety of other areas, such as in the nests and burrows of mammals, within the trunks of hollow trees and inside bat caves. The resting position adopted by Lutzomyia sand flies is characteristic to the genus, with wings angling above the abdomen.

== Medical importance ==
=== Leishmaniasis ===
The sand fly genus Lutzomyia includes all species responsible for transmission, in the New World, of the Leishmania parasite, the causative agent of leishmaniasis. Of the more than 350 Lutzomyia species identified, less than 10% are known or suspected to transmit leishmaniasis to humans. The disease is in endemic in 22 countries of tropical and subtropical America, where it is generally considered a zoonosis. That is, the parasite cycles between mammalian reservoir hosts and the sand flies, with humans serving as incidental, dead-end hosts. Common reservoirs in the Americas include a number of rodent species, as well as dogs, sloths and armadillos. The Lutzomyia sand flies maintain transmission amongst reservoir species and allow the disease to 'jump' to humans, causing the visceral, cutaneous or mucocutaneous forms of the disease depending on the Leishmania species. Visceral Leishmaniasis is a serious form of the disease in particular that affects the internal organs. This specific disease is primarily transmitted by the species Lutzomyia longipalpis. The human-sand fly-human cycle of transmission, known as anthroponotic, is limited to two Leishmania species endemic in the Old World and so does not involve Lutzomyia sand flies.

Giemsa-stained amastigotes of Leishmania (Viannia) panamensis

The New World Leishmania species transmitted by Lutzomyia sand flies are often classified in the subgenus, Viannia. These genetically distinct parasites show markedly different patterns of development within the New World sand flies when compared to those seen in the Old World Phlebotomus sand flies. The first stages of development are similar between all Leishmania species, with the sandfly taking up the amastigote form of the parasite following a bite of an infected host. However, unlike in the Old World, the replicated parasites then migrate to the hindgut of the Lutzomyia sand fly, a feature which is thought to be essential in allowing the parasite to become established. The parasite then undergoes further development into the infective, promastigote stage as it migrates to anterior end of the insect, ready for inoculation into a new, susceptible host.

The high level of species diversity in the genus Lutzomyia, coupled with its high adaptability is leading to increasing risk of Leishmania transmission in the New World in response to global change. Lutzomyia sand flies transmit the disease in the tropics and subtropics, regions which are subject to high levels of deforestation associated with continual development. Deforestation, with the establishment of settlements at the periphery of primary or secondary forest, increases the risk of Leishmania transmission by creating a selection pressure for the adaptation of sand flies to these new peridomestic environments. In southern Brazil, for example, levels of cutaneous leishmaniasis are increasing as a result of the adaptation of three, formerly forest-inhabiting species (Lutzomyia intermedia, Lutzomyia whitmani and Lutzomyi migonei) following deforestation. Now, a disease which previously only affected forest workers is becoming more prevalent in urbanisations. Similar increases in risk factors are also driving higher rates of visceral leishmaniasis in north-eastern Brazil. Increased urbanisation, driven by climate change and socio-economic factors, is bringing the adapting sand flies into closer contact with both humans and the domestic canine reservoirs of the disease.

=== Carrion's disease ===
Carrion's disease, also known as bartonellosis, is a disease caused by the blood-borne bacteria, Bartonella bacilliformis. The disease is transmitted by the sand fly species Lutzomyia verracarum, as well as lice and fleas, and is found in areas of Peru, Colombia and Ecuador. The lifecycle of the bacteria within Lutzomyia sand flies remain largely unknown, with speculation that the bacteria are spread between sandflies sharing the same breeding grounds and water supplies. The existence of bartonellosis transmission in areas not inhabited by Lutzomyia verracarum suggests that secondary vectors, and potentially other Lutzomyia species, are important in the spread of the disease.

=== Viruses ===
A number of arthropod-borne viruses (arboviruses) are transmitted by Lutzomyia sand flies. One such virus of medical importance is the vesicular stomatitis virus (VSV) of the genus Vesiculovirus. Viruses of this genus are typically associated with flu-like symptoms, but have also been known to cause encephalitis. While transmission of the Indiana serotype of VSV by Lutzomyia trapidoi has been demonstrated under laboratory conditions, little is known about the cycles of virus infection between vertebrates and Lutzomyia sand flies. However, they are thought to be supported by both horizontal and transovarial transmission in the sand fly.

== See also ==
Maria Cristina Ferro
