= Climate change and vector-borne diseases in Africa =

Effects of climate change on vector-borne diseases in Africa

Climate change and vector-borne diseases in Africa refers to the effects of climate variability and long-term climate change on the distribution, transmission, and burden of diseases spread by vectors such as mosquitoes, tsetse flies, ticks, and sandflies across Africa. Climatic factors, including temperature, rainfall, humidity, and extreme weather events, influence the survival, reproduction, and geographic distribution of disease vectors, thereby affecting disease transmission patterns.

Africa faces a major challenge of vector-borne diseases, particularly malaria, which accounts for the majority of global malaria cases and deaths. Research has shown that climate change may affect the suitability of environments for disease vectors, resulting in changes in disease distribution and seasonal transmission patterns. Other factors such as urbanization, population growth, land-use change, migration, and healthcare access also contribute to disease dynamics.

== Background ==
Vector-borne diseases are infectious diseases transmitted by arthropods and other organisms that carry pathogens between humans or from animals to humans. According to the World Health Organization (WHO), vector-borne diseases account for more than 17% of all infectious diseases worldwide and cause more than 700,000 deaths annually.

The African continent experiences a high barrier of vector-borne diseases because of its tropical and subtropical climates, ecological diversity, and socioeconomic conditions that may affect disease prevention and control. Malaria remains the most widely spread vector-borne disease in Africa, while dengue fever, chikungunya, yellow fever, leishmaniasis, and human African trypanosomiasis continue to affect millions of people across different regions.

Environmental conditions are vital determinants of vector survival and disease transmission. Temperature affects vector development and pathogen replication, while rainfall influences the availability of breeding sites. Humidity also affects vector life span and activity. As climatic conditions change, the distribution and quantity of vectors may also change.

== Climate change in Africa ==
Africa is among the regions considered most vulnerable to the effects of climate change. The continent faced increasing average temperatures, changing precipitation patterns, prolonged droughts, and more frequent extreme weather events in recent decades.

Changes in temperature and rainfall can affect vector ecology in several ways. Warmer temperatures may increase vector life cycles, increase biting frequency, and shorten the incubation period of pathogens within vectors. Increased rainfall may create new breeding habitats for mosquitoes, while drought conditions may force populations to store water in containers that become breeding sites for disease vectors.

Research has suggested that climate change may expand the geographic range of certain vector-borne diseases into areas previously unsuitable for transmission, including highland regions of East Africa. Conversely, some regions may become less suitable because of excessive heat or changing environmental conditions.

== Major vector-borne diseases affected ==
Major vector-borne diseases affected by climate change in Africa
Disease	Main vector	Climate-sensitive factors	Principal regions	Ref
Malaria	Anopheles mosquitoes	Temperature, rainfall, humidity	Sub-Saharan Africa	
Dengue fever	Aedes aegypti	Rising temperature, urban flooding	West and East Africa	
Chikungunya	Aedes mosquitoes	Rainfall variability and warming	East Africa and Central Africa	
Rift Valley fever	Mosquitoes	Heavy rainfall and flooding	East Africa	
Human African trypanosomiasis	Tsetse flies	Habitat and ecological shifts	East Africa and Central Africa	
Leishmaniasis	Sandflies	Temperature and humidity changes	North Africa and East Africa	
