= Heart disease in India =

Overview of cardiovascular diseases in India

Heart disease in India refers to the spectrum of cardiovascular diseases affecting the population of India. It has emerged as a leading cause of morbidity and mortality in the country, accounting for a significant and growing public health burden. Cardiovascular diseases have surpassed infectious diseases as the primary cause of death in India, reflecting a major epidemiological transition over the past few decades.

The prevalence of cardiovascular diseases in India has increased substantially. Studies indicate that cardiovascular diseases affect Indians at a younger age compared to populations in high-income countries, often occurring 5-10 years earlier and frequently striking during an individual's most productive years. The burden of these diseases is no longer confined to urban areas or affluent sections of society; there is a growing incidence in rural areas and among lower socioeconomic groups, although regional variations exist across different states.

Several risk factors contribute to the high burden of heart disease in India. These include traditional factors such as hypertension, diabetes mellitus (which has a high prevalence in India), dyslipidemia (abnormal cholesterol levels), tobacco use (both smoking and smokeless tobacco), unhealthy diets characterized by high intake of salt, sugar, and unhealthy fats, low levels of physical activity, and rising rates of obesity. Additionally, factors such as air pollution (both ambient and household), psychological stress, and a potential genetic predisposition among South Asians are increasingly recognized as significant contributors.

== Pop Culture ==
The Brown Heart, a documentary, streaming on Disney+ Hotstar is based on prevalence of heart disease among south Asians.

== See also ==
- Epidemiology of cardiovascular disease
- Global Burden of Disease Study
- Healthcare in India
- Risk factors for cardiovascular disease
- Indian Heart Association
