= Obesity in India =

Share of adults that are obese, 1975 to 2016

Obesity in India has reached epidemic proportions in the 21st century, with morbid obesity affecting 5% of the country's population. India is following a trend of other developing countries that are steadily becoming more obese. Unhealthy, processed food has become much more accessible following India's continued integration in global food markets. This, combined with rising middle class incomes, is increasing the average caloric intake per individual among middle class and high income households. Obesity is a major risk factor for cardiovascular disease, and NGOs such as the Indian Heart Association have been raising awareness about this issue.

While studying 22 different SNPs near to MC_{4}-R gene, scientists have identified an SNP (single nucleotide polymorphism) named rs12970134 to be mostly associated with waist circumference. In this study more than two thousand individuals of Indian origin participated and the aforementioned SNP is highly prevalent in this group.

Internationally, a BMI over 25 kg/m^{2} is considered overweight. Due to genetic tendency of Indians towards abdominal obesity and its associated risk of related lifestyle diseases such as diabetes and anemia, guidelines for diagnosis of obesity and abdominal obesity for India have been published in JAPI (2009) that a BMI over 23 kg/m^{2} is considered overweight. Further definitions: Normal BMI: 18.0-22.9 kg/m^{2}, Overweight: 23.0-24.9 kg/m^{2}, Obesity: >25 kg/m^{2}.

== NFHS data ==
This is a list of the states of India ranked in order of percentage of people who are overweight or obese, based on data from the 2016-2021National Family Health Survey.

States	Males (%)	Males rank	Females (%)	Females rank
India	18.9	24	20.7	22
Delhi	24.6	11	33.5	5
Chandigarh	32.0	6	41.4	1
Dadra and Nagar Haveli	22.9	15	19.2	25
Daman and Diu	30.7	7	31.7	9
Andaman and Nicobar Islands	38.2	1	31.8	8
Lakshadweep	24.1	13	40.6	2
Puducherry	37.1	2	36.7	3
Punjab	27.8	10	31.3	10
Kerala	28.5	8	32.4	7
Goa	32.7	5	33.5	4
Tamil Nadu	28.2	9	30.9	11
Andhra Pradesh	33.5	4	33.2	6
Sikkim	34.8	3	26.7	15
Mizoram	20.9	18	21.1	20
Himachal Pradesh	22.0	17	28.7	13
Maharashtra	23.8	14	23.4	18
Gujarat	19.7	23	23.8	17
Haryana	20.0	21	21.0	21
Karnataka	22.1	16	23.3	17
Manipur	19.8	22	26.0	16
Uttarakhand	17.7	25	20.5	23
Arunachal Pradesh	20.6	19	18.8	26
Uttar Pradesh	12.5	33	16.5	27
Jammu and Kashmir	20.5	20	29.1	12
Bihar	12.6	32	11.7	36
Nagaland	13.9	29	16.2	29
Rajasthan	13.2	30	14.1	31
Meghalaya	10.0	37	12.2	34
Odisha	17.3	26	16.5	28
Assam	12.9	31	13.2	33
Chhattisgarh	10.2	36	11.9	35
West Bengal	14.2	28	19.9	24
Madhya Pradesh	10.9	35	13.6	32
Jharkhand	11.1	34	10.3	37
Telangana	24.2	12	28.7	13
Tripura	15.9	27	16.0	30

== See also ==
- Health in India
- Malnutrition in India
- Epidemiology of obesity
