= Below Poverty Line =

Indian benchmark

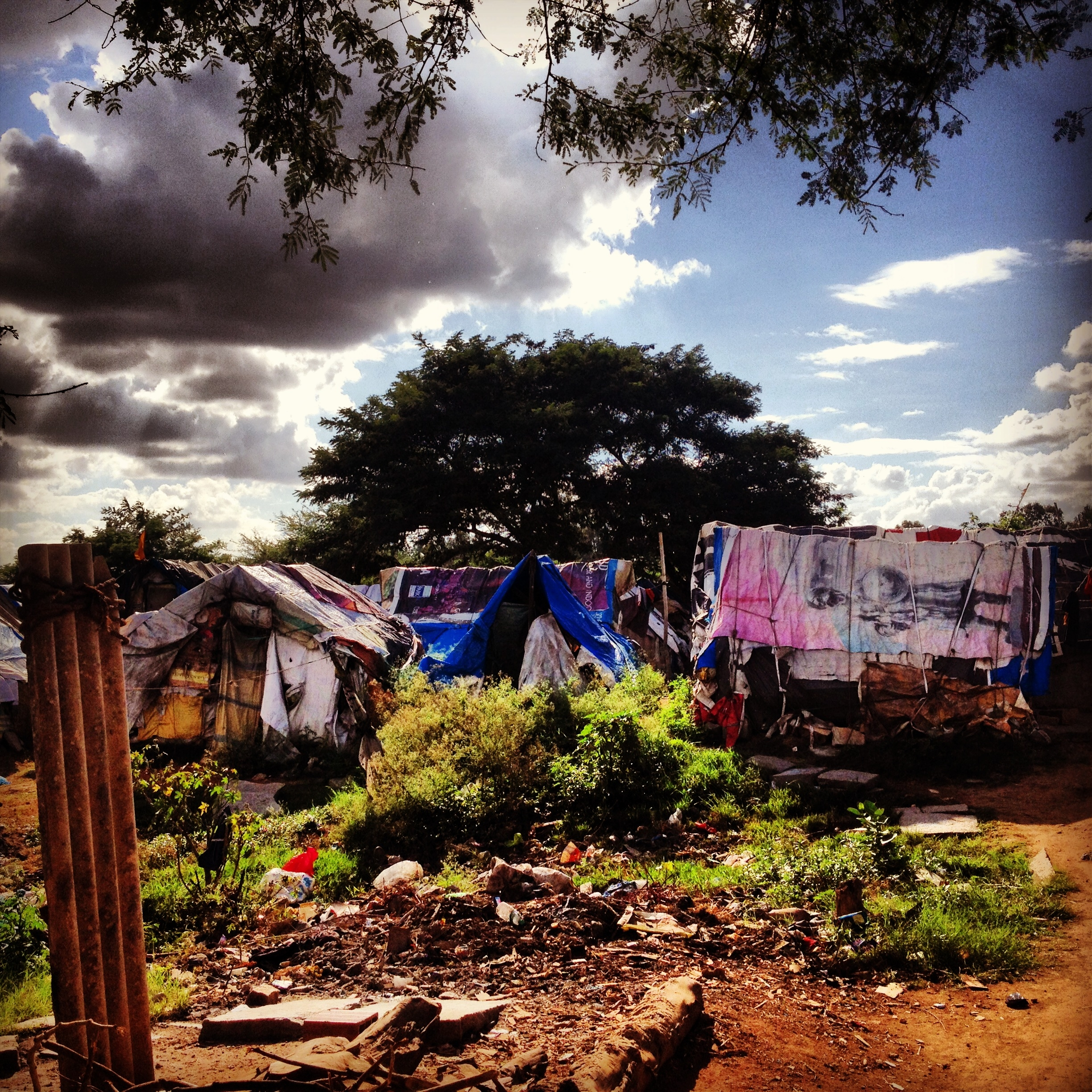
Lingarajpuram, a poor village in India

Below Poverty Line (BPL) is a benchmark used by the government of India to indicate economic disadvantage and to identify individuals and households in need of government assistance and aid. It is determined using various parameters which vary from state to state and within states. The present criteria are based on a survey conducted in 2002. Going into a survey due for a decade, India's central government is undecided on criteria to identify families below poverty line.

Internationally, an income of less than ₹150 per day per head of purchasing power parity is defined as extreme poverty. By this estimate, about 12.4% of Indians are extremely poor as of year 2012. Income-based poverty lines consider the bare minimum income to provide basic food requirements; it does not account for other essentials such as health care and education.

As there is no update of population estimate by the government since 2011, the data on poor people in India is not available. Estimates vary from 34 million to 373 million.

== Current method of population ==
Criteria are different for the rural and urban areas. In its Tenth Five-Year Plan, the degree of deprivation is measured with the help of parameters with scores given from 0–4, with 13 parameters. Families with 17 marks or less (formerly 15 marks or less) out of a maximum 52 marks have been classified as BPL. Poverty line solely depends on the per capita income in India rather than level of prices.

== Five-Year Plans ==
In its Ninth Five-Year Plan (1995–2002), BPL for rural areas was set at annual family income less than Rs. 20,000, less than two hectares land, and no television or refrigerator. The number of rural BPL families was 650,000 during the 9th Plan. The survey based on this criterion was again carried out in 2002 and the total number of 387,000 families were identified. This figure was in force until September 2006.

There were debates around the comparability of the 1999-2000 NSS data with the 2004-05 data, especially for the rural areas. Data showed a decline in poverty from 36% to 28%, but higher poverty rates in certain areas. Different groups proposed different methods of measuring poverty, but the Planning Commission chose the Tendulkar Committee's method that "updated the expenditure basket and revised the poverty line and consequently estimated the percentage of poor people in India at 37% or 435 million in 2004–05.

In its Tenth Five-Year Plan (2002–2007) survey, BPL for rural areas was based on the degree of deprivation in respect of 13 parameters, with scores from 0–4: landholding, type of house, clothing, food security, sanitation, consumer durables, literacy status, labour force, means of livelihood, status of children, type of indebtedness, reasons for migrations, etc.

The Planning Commission fixed an upper limit of 326,000 for rural BPL families on the basis of a simple survey. Accordingly, families having less than 15 marks out of maximum 52 marks have been classified as BPL and their number works out to 318,000. The survey was carried out in 2002 and thereafter but could not be finalised due to a stay issued by the Supreme Court of India. The stay was vacated in February 2006 and this survey was finalised and adopted in September 2006. This survey formed the basis for benefits under Indian government schemes. The state governments are free to adopt any criteria/survey for state-level schemes.

In its Tenth Five-Year Plan BPL for urban areas was based on degree of deprivation in respect of seven parameters: roof, floor, water, sanitation, education level, type of employment, and status of children in a house. A total of 125,000 upper families were identified as BPL in urban area in 2004. It has been implemented since then.

Those spending over Rs 32 a day in rural areas and Rs 47 in towns and cities should not be considered poor, an expert panel headed by former RBI governor C Rangarajan said in a report submitted to the BJP. The recommendation has only raised the bar marginally.

Based on the Suresh Tendulkar panel's recommendations in 2011–12, the poverty line had been fixed at Rs 27 in rural areas and Rs 33 in urban areas, levels at which getting two meals may be difficult.

The Rangarajan committee was tasked with revisiting the Tendulkar formula for estimation of poverty and identification of the poor after a massive public outcry erupted over the abnormally low poverty lines fixed by UPA government

== The case of Kerala ==
Beginning in the 1990s, the government of Kerala started utilizing a multidimensional approach to measuring poor households in the state. This method, called the Kerala method was developed by NGOs and then executed through the local governments called panchayats. This method employs nine parameters as core indicators, and eight more criteria to measure poverty in the state. The core indicators of poverty are related to housing, caste/tribe, source of income, presence of babies, presence of drug addicts, literacy, and sanitation in the household. The additional indicators are composed of socio-cultural factors unique to local regions. Each of the indicators are weighted unequally and severity of each is taken into account. This method was created by involving neighborhood groups called "ayalkoottangal". This approach is viewed as bottom-up because the local people were engaged in the creation of this approach and selection of indicators of poverty; this marked the Kerala method as more participatory than the BPL.

In Kerala, there are nine parameters. Families which lack access to four or more parameters are classified as BPL.

The nine parameters for urban areas are:

- No land or less than five cents of land
- No house or dilapidated house
- No sanitation latrine
- Family with an illiterate family member
- No regular employed person in the family
- No access to safe drinking water
- Women-headed household or presence of widows or divorcee
- Scheduled castes and scheduled tribes (SC/ST)
- intellectually disabled or disabled member in the family

Kerala experienced significant changes in its social welfare system for people living below the poverty line. Before 1997, nearly 95% of Kerala's families held a ration card and were able to reap the benefits of the Public Distribution System (PDS). The beneficiaries were 'equitably spread across income groups in both rural and urban areas.' Fair price shops were conveniently located in both urban and rural spaces, and 'no individual needed to walk more than 2 km' to access rice and wheat. The PDS system of Kerala was among the most effective in the entire nation and as a result, Kerala was among the top states in lowering overall poverty.

In 1997, the Indian government changed the PDS to focus on the poorest families; PDS became Targeted PDS. The government issued new cards to families living below the poverty line and restricted access to the fair price shops to the beneficiaries of the TDPS only. While the BPL counted 25% of Kerala's families as eligible for the PDS, the Kerala government identified 42% of the population as poor households and beneficiaries of the BPL. Due to this discrepancy, the state itself provided subsidies from its own budget. But due to the new schemes, constant changes and variance in prices led to confusion among the beneficiaries. With higher food prices for people living above the poverty line, many ration shops lost business.

== Income based poverty line in India ==
The poverty line was originally fixed in terms of income/food requirements in 2000. It was stipulated that the calorie standard for a typical individual in rural areas was 2400 calorie and was 2100 calorie in urban areas. Then the cost of the grains (about 650 g) that fulfil this normative standard was calculated. This cost was the poverty line. In 1978, it was Rs. 61.80 per person per month for rural areas and Rs. 71.30 for urban areas. And Since then the Planning Commission calculates the poverty line every year adjusting for inflation. The poverty line in recent years is as follows – (Rs. per month per head)

Year	India rural	India urban
2000–2001	328	454
2005–2006	368	558
2011–2012	816	1000

This income is bare minimum to support the food requirements and does not provide much for the other basic essential items like health, education etc. That is why sometimes the poverty lines have been described as starvation lines.

== Fixing of cut-off marks at 17 ==
The Socio Economic Survey conducted during 2002 was based on 13 Socio economic indicators (enlisted by Government of India) indicating the quality of life and by Score-based ranking for all households. Each of the indicators have 0–4 marks. Thus for 13 indicators, the tentative marks obtained by the families are from 0–52 for all the Districts. The Supreme Court of India in Writ Petition No. 196/2001 filed by People's Union for Civil Liberties, the result of Below Poverty Line census 2002 need not be finalised. Later in October 2005 the Government of India informed that based on the advice given by the Additional Solicitor General, it has been decided to finalise the results of Below Poverty Line Census 2002 without deleting the Below Poverty Line families already existing in the Below Poverty Line list of Below Poverty Line Census 1997 and to follow the following procedure for finalisation of Below Poverty Line list.

1. Preparation of Below Poverty Line list
2. Approval in Gram Sabha
3. Appeal to Block Development Officer and Collector.
4. Display of Final List

The Government of India then decided that the Below Poverty Line list for 2002 could be finalised as per original guidelines. The Director of Rural Development and Panchayat Raj stated that in the Below Poverty Line survey done in 1991 out of 8,433,000 Rural families 3,446,000 families were identified as Below Poverty Line families. In the Below Poverty Line survey done in the year 1999 out of 9,388,000 rural families 2,737,000 families were identified as Below Poverty Line families. He has stated that if the cut off mark is fixed as 16 the total number of families would be 2,548,000 families against the total families of 8,665,000 which is lesser than the number of families indicated by Government of India viz. 2,677,000 families. If the cut off mark is fixed as 17 marks, then the total the number of Below Poverty line families would be 3,051,000. This is marginally above the number of families indicated by Government of India. i.e. 2,677,000 families. He has therefore recommended that the cut off marks to arrive at the number of Below Poverty Line families may be fixed at 17 so that no Below Poverty Line family gets left out of the list and requested orders of Government in this regard. The Government after detailed examination has decided to accept the proposal of the Director of Rural Development and Panchayat Raj and accordingly order to fix the cut off mark as 17 for identification of a family as Below Poverty Line family.8. The Director of Rural Development and Panchayat Raj is requested to take necessary further action for finalisation of Below Poverty Line List for rural areas of this state as per the procedure laid down by Government of India.

== BPL Beneficiaries ==
Certain groups, specifically those under Scheduled Castes (SC) and Scheduled Tribes (ST), suffer from exclusion in the poverty debates. While the National Sample Survey (NSS) data showed a decline in overall poverty from 36% in 1993–94 to 28% in 2004–05, the numbers told a different story for areas with tribal populations. The 2004-05 NSS also showed that "the average consumption of Adivasis (ST) was a mere 70% of the average, and that of Dalits (SC) less than 80% of the average." This census also showed that STs and SCs make up a large proportion of India's poor. The government's programmes for these groups tend to be executed not as strongly and also tend to progress very slowly. STs and SCs also suffer from displacement, caste-based violence and discrimination in education and employment. States hold the power to make special arrangements for these groups through "reserved seats" in educational institutions and special grants and scholarships. In addition, certain "income generation programs" along with financial organizations that provide coaching in "entrepreneurial skills" do exist for these groups. A certain number of government jobs are set aside for these minority groups as well. A study found that in an area where member of SC/ST groups are assigned roles of leadership, more funds are allocated towards welfare programs. In other words, political representation of the poor makes a huge impact on allocation of resources.

Other programs available for the beneficiaries of BPL include: Sarva Shikhsa Abhiyan (SSA), the National Rural Health Mission, National Rural Employment Guarantee. SSA works to bring education to children from poor families and incorporates community work and organization. The NRHM focuses on accessibility to health care in some of the poorest areas of India, and encourages education and uplifting of Adivasi and Dalit women. The NREG "implies a legal entitlement for every poor rural family to 100 days of work at the minimum wage, and aims to end food insecurity, empower village communities, and create assets".

== Criticism of BPL criteria ==
The National Sample Survey Office originally focused on capturing absolute poverty by looking at the per capita consumption as representative of the overall welfare of individuals. This left out factors that are involved in individual social and economic well-being. These factors are the non-income dimensions of poverty – such as education, religious factors. gender related problems, and issues surrounding employment. Although the measures of poverty in India show reduction in the numbers, the gap of inequality has actually increased among the rich and the poor; that is exactly why examining factors other than income are crucial to understanding the reality of both absolute and relative poverty.

The BPL method employed to measure the number of people living in poverty in India takes food, clothing, housing, and sanitation into account along with literacy and labor status. This approach is top-down, meaning that officials in power decide what indicators to use and how much each indicator should weigh. This method is criticised to be exclusive of the people it is assessing, as it does not take their opinions into account.

The food indicator of the BPL method counts the number of meals a family has and completely ignores the quality and nutritional factors. For instance, if an individual eats by begging on the street or picks up food from garbage, he or she still earns four points. There is an emphasis on school attendance as an indicator of better opportunities; quality of education and skills is ignored measuring poverty.

Physical and mental disability are also factors that the BPL does not take into account. As government records show, there are a total of 11.31 lakh disabled people in the state of Madhya Pradesh, 8.9 lakh of which live below the poverty line; yet only 3.8 lakh receive government help in the form of social security pension.

In order to become a beneficiary of the BPL and receive benefits like the Public Distribution System, the government requires identification documents and a permanent address. For families that are homeless and reside on pavements and parks, they have no means of obtaining ration cards and cheap food grains. They are essentially denied their rights as citizens and left vulnerable in a critical situation.

The BPL also does not count families that are affected by violence and crime and affected by conditions like HIV and leprosy. These families may be struggling to make ends meet but do not receive benefits of the BPL due to the criteria of the BPL.

Marxist Communist party member and Social activist Mariam Dhavale, State secretary of the All India Democratic Women's Association (AIDWA), finds the criteria for determining BPL status puzzling and one that excludes the deserving.

If you have a pucca house, a two-wheeler, a fan… you are ineligible. The pucca house could have been in your family for generations and is not necessarily a reflection of your present situation. There was a government scheme once in which girls were given cycles to ensure they went to schools. Because the girls had a cycle they were not counted as BPL

== Example of misuse of BPL Schemes ==
Corruption in the system allows those ineligible to gain benefits of the BPL status. A chain of corruption exists between the Government officer to the government appointed retailer resulting in grain and fuel been diverted to the black market

In some places, it has been reported that for the sake of their votes, some corrupt MLA's and officials made government employees gain benefits under BPL scheme. An approach to combat corruption is to attempt linkage with Aadhar

== New survey ==
Central Government took a departure from the earlier practice of getting surveys conducted by the rural development machinery of different State Governments, for identification of families below the poverty line. The earlier practice, of identifying a single set of target families for all developmental programmes, has been done away with. This was partly necessitated by an interim stay order given by the Supreme Court for 10th and 11th five year plans. The trend is now increasingly to have development schemes run on the principle of universalisation or saturation or self-selection. This means following a priority list for each scheme, rather than following a single list of identified families for all schemes. For example, the people who put in manual work under Mahatma Gandhi National Rural Employment Guarantee Act need not belong to families below the poverty line. Whoever is within the specified age bracket and is willing to get enrolled, can get covered. Similarly, the beneficiaries under National Food Security Act are identified by the State/UT Governments, with the ceiling/ coverage under TPDS determined for each State/UT by the central Government. This list of families can be different from the priority list used for rural housing programmes under Pradhan Mantri Awas Yojana (Grameen), which runs on the basis of whether a person has or does not have a pucca house, based on SECC survey of 2011. Similarly, the rural electrification programme Rajiv Gandhi Grameen Vidyutikaran Yojana had the concept of below poverty line families. But the new approach of Soubhagya scheme is to make no discrimination based on the poverty line, but to go on the basis of households that do not have electricity connection. In the maternity benefit scheme renamed as Pradhan Mantri Matru Vandana Yojana, there is automatic and universal coverage, without any mention of whether a pregnant woman is below the poverty line or not. (See Ministry of Women and Child Development at http://www.wcd.nic.in/sites/default/files/PMMVY%20Scheme%20Implemetation%20Guidelines%20._0.pdf) However, there is still lack of clarity on fully integrating SECC data of 2011 with old age pension/ widow pension/ disability pension schemes. This is because the guidelines of National Social Assistance Programme still speak about list of families below the poverty line. (See http://nsap.nic.in/Guidelines/nsap_guidelines_oct2014.pdf) Thus, by and large, the present position is that while SECC database of 2011 provides a basic skeleton, each developmental scheme is now run independently based on the necessity, rather than getting bogged down to one single list of targeted families.

== See also ==
- Famine in India
- Malnutrition in India
