= Diabetes in India =

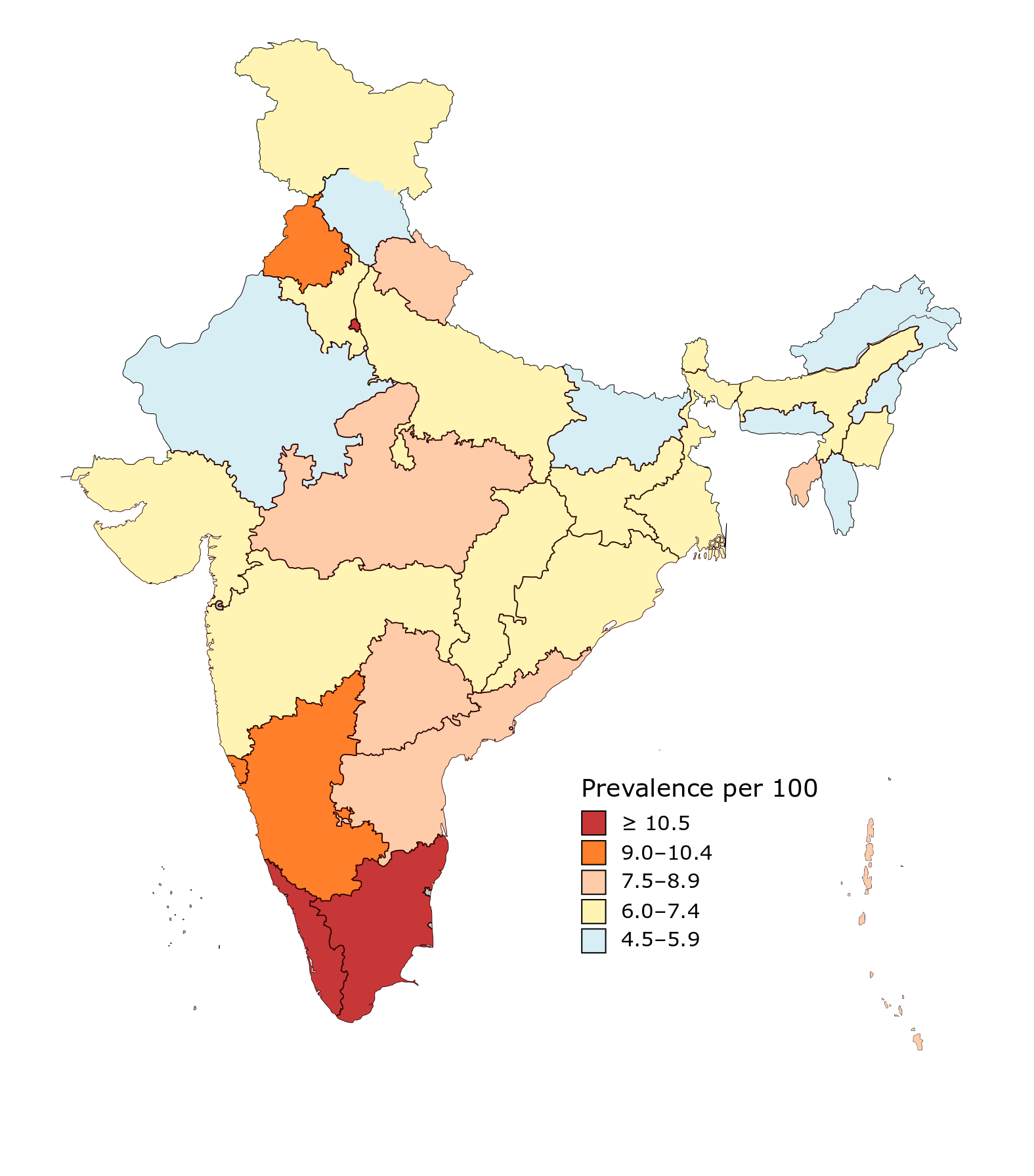
Prevalence of diabetes in Indian states in 2016

India has an estimated 212 million people with diabetes out of 828 million globally. One in four people (26%) in the world with diabetes is from India, making it the most affected country in the world. (India's population as calculated in November 2024 was about 17.78% of the global total.)

In India, type 1 diabetes is rarer than in western countries, and about 90 to 95% of Indians who were diagnosed had type 2 diabetes. Only about one-third of type 2 diabetics in India have a body mass index above 25. A 2004 study suggests that the prevalence of type 2 diabetes in Indians may be due to environmental and lifestyle changes resulting from industrialization and migration to urban environment from rural. This lifestyle change has led to the increased consumption of energy intake from animal foods in Asian populations. This change has been seen in India where urban residents consumed 32% of energy from animal fats compared to 17% of rural residents. These changes also occur earlier in life, which means chronic long-term complications are more common.

== Epidemiology ==
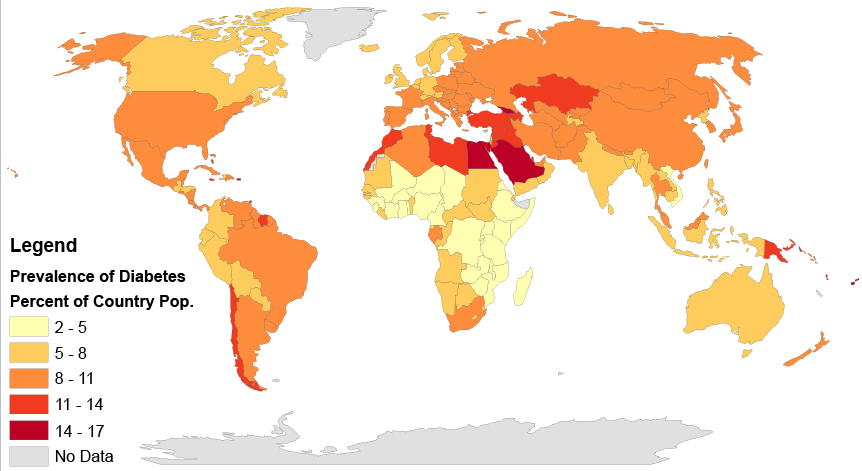
Rates of diabetes worldwide in 2014. The worldwide prevalence was 9.2%. In India it is 8.9% as of 2020.

In 2020, according to the International Diabetes Federation (IDF), 463 million people have diabetes in the world and 88 million people in the Southeast Asia region. Of this 88 million people, 77 million belong to India. The prevalence of diabetes in the population is 8.9%, according to the IDF. According to the IDF estimates, India has the second highest number of children with type 1 diabetes after the United States. It also contributes to the largest proportion of incident cases of type 1 diabetes in children in the SEA region. Per the World Health Organization, 2% of all deaths in India are due to diabetes.

The number of people with diabetes in India has increased from 26 million in 1990 to 65 million in 2016. According to the 2019 National Diabetes and Diabetic Retinopathy Survey report released by the Ministry of Health and Family Welfare, the prevalence was found to be 11.8% in people over the age of 50. The prevalence of diabetes is 6.5% and prediabetes 5.7% among the adults below the age of 50 years, according to the DHS survey. The prevalence was similar in both male (12%) and female (11.7%) populations. It was higher in urban areas. When surveyed for diabetic retinopathy, which threatens eyesight, 16.9% of the diabetic population aged up to 50 years were found to be affected. Per the report, diabetic retinopathy in the 60-69-years age group was 18.6%, in the 70-79-years age group it was 18.3%, and in those over 80 years of age it was 18.4%. A lower prevalence of 14.3% was observed in the 50-59-years age group. High prevalence of diabetes is reported in economically and epidemiologically advanced states such as Tamil Nadu and Kerala, where many research institutes which conduct prevalence studies are also present.

There are four sub-groups or clusters of people with type 2 diabetes in India, two of which are unique to the country. These sub-groups have different risk levels of complications and might need different treatments.

== Diabetes-related disease burden ==
Over the past three decades, the burden of diabetes in terms of deaths and Disability-adjusted life year (DALYs) has more than doubled in India. As per the Global Burden of Disease (GBD) Data Visualizations, the recorded death rate and DALY rate of diabetes in 2019 were 19.64 per 100,000 and 919.02 per 100,000 population, respectively, including males and females. The GBD explore risk assessment framework estimated that diabetes-related DALYs attributable to high risk for Stroke, Coronary artery disease, Chronic obstructive pulmonary disease, Chronic kidney disease, Diarrhoeal diseases, Lower respiratory tract infection, Dietary iron deficiency, and Neonatal disorders.

According to a survey conducted in 2016, the High body mass index (BMI) appeared to be the major risk factor contributing to 36% of diabetes DALYs. Besides, other risk factors, such as dietary risk, tobacco consumption, occupational exposure to passive smoke, low physical activity, and alcohol consumption, played a significant role as contributing risk factors.

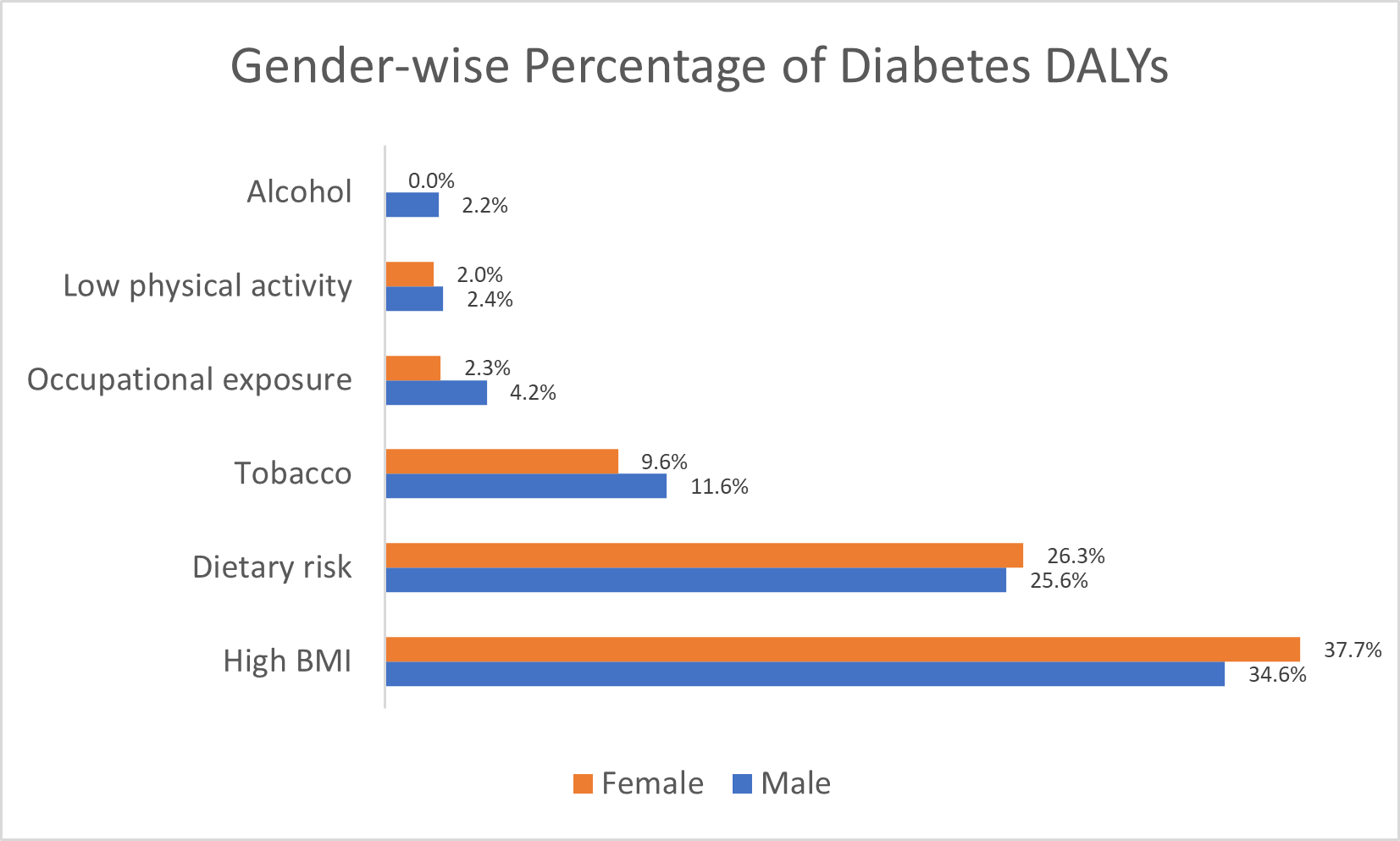
Percentage contribution of major risk factors to diabetes DALYs in India by gender

== Prevention ==
The majority of diabetes cases are of type 2 diabetes. In order to control diabetes in India, the Government of India initiated the National Program for Prevention and Control of Cancer, Diabetes, Cardiovascular Diseases, and Stroke (NPCDCS) in 2010. It aims to set up outreach camps for opportunistic screening at all levels in the health care delivery system for early detection of diabetes, among other illnesses.

Preventing diabetes in the developing nations is valued highly because of the high cost of treating it. In India, it is estimated that a diabetic person spends a median of ₹10,000 (US$100) for medical treatment. Pragmatic, cost-effective strategies for primary prevention of diabetes is necessary. Studies using information technology were tested. In one such program, SMS was used to motivate people with impaired glucose tolerance (IGT) to follow lifestyle modification (LSM). This was found to be effective with a relative risk reduction of 36% compared to the participants who had only standard care.

=== Indian Diabetes Prevention Program ===
The Indian Diabetes Prevention Program is a three-year randomized control trial that employed LSM and metformin (Met) to prevent type 2 diabetes in subjects with IGT. It concluded that LSM and Met were cost-effective interventions for preventing diabetes among high-risk individuals in India and other developing countries.

=== National Diabetes Control Program ===
The National Diabetes Control Program was initiated in 1987 in some districts of Tamil Nadu, Jammu and Kashmir, and Karnataka. Its objectives included:

- Identifying high-risk individuals
- Introducing health education for the purposes of early intervention
- Aiming for early diagnosis and treatment of affected individuals
- Reducing morbidity and mortality in high-risk groups
- Preventing acute and chronic metabolic, cardiovascular, renal, and ocular complications due to the disease
- Rehabilitating people who have been handicapped due to the disease

However, the program was not expanded to other states due to shortage of funds.

== See also ==
- Health in India
- Tuberculosis in India
