= The MINDS Foundation =

Non-profit organisation

The MINDS Foundation logo.

The MINDS Foundation, a nonprofit located in India, uses a grassroots approach to eliminate stigma and provide educational, medical, and moral support for patients with mental illness in rural India. (1) The organization conducts ongoing research and develops curriculum to expand education about mental health and increase the number of trained staff who can support patients with mental illness. MINDS works with a broad team of directors, advisors, field workers and assistants and receives support through a variety of foundations, grants and NGOs. Since its creation in 2010, MINDS has increased the level of education and treatment with regards to mental illness, overcoming many of the challenges of rural health work in India.

== Approach ==
MINDS uses a three-phase approach for education, treatment and reintegration.

Phase 1 focuses on community-wide education held in each village by social workers, MINDS staff and Community Mental Health Workers. After a short 45-minute film explaining the basics of mental illness and the effectiveness of treatment, there are facilitated discussions and Q&A sessions which focus on de-stigmatization of mental illness. Research suggests that lack of health education in rural India contributes to serious misunderstandings, stigma and denial about the existence and causes of mental illness. According to current studies, psychologists believe education programs about mental illness are one of the most effective ways to reduce this stigma and encourage patients to receive the treatment they need.

Phase 2 focuses on effective, free treatment for any mentally ill person who wishes to receive help. MINDS is committed to working in relation with communities and hospitals across Gujarat and, therefore, provides free daily transport to local hospitals, free consultation with local doctors and free medication. Furthermore, to ease the treatment process, families of patients are welcome to accompany the patients to the hospitals and doctors appointments. According to the National Alliance on Mental Illness, 70-90% of all global mentally ill patients who receive treatment partially or completely recover.

Phase 3 focuses on each patient's reintegration into the local community after treatment. With the help of Community Mental Health Workers, patients receive continued medical support and education. Families of patients also benefit from support and education during this transition. The Phase 1 education and de-stigmatization pave the way for this third phase of MINDS work.

== Programs and Research ==
In addition to the three-phase program running in villages across Gujarat, India, MINDS continually develops programs and conducts research to expand programing. Below is a summary of current, developing programing.

Community Mental Health Worker (CMHW) Training Community Mental Health Workers (CMHWs) work as advisors and mentors in each village where MINDS programming is run. The CMHWs go through extensive training that focuses on identifying mental illness, connecting patients to hospital care, advising and educating families of mentally ill, supporting the phase 3 reintegration process and facilitating phase 1 education workshops. The training for CMHWs was developed in partnership with the Nossal Institute for Global Health, adapted from An Introduction to Mental Health: Facilitator's Manual for Training Community Health Workers in India by the Nossal Institute for Global Health & BasicNeeds

Teacher Training Currently MINDS is developing a training program, based on the WHO advocation of Task-Shifting, which trains teachers at local schools to identify and support mentally ill youth. The program follows a four-step model focused on understanding why mental illness is a problem, identifying possible signs of mental illness in students, supporting students through active listening and de-stigmatization of classrooms and referring students to CMHWs for further consolation and screening.

Gender Workshops Additionally, MINDS is considering how discussions and education about gender-specific concerns surrounding mental illness and well-being could further deepen the Phase 1 programming.

Published Research Knowledge of and Attitudes Toward Clinical Depression Among Health Providers in Gujarat, India.

Perceptions of Traditional Healing for Mental Illness in Rural Gujarat.

== Organization and Administration ==
In order to manage field work, project development and research, MINDS has a multi-level organizational system that combines full-time employees with professional volunteers and advisors around the world. The core team, associates and field team manage the non-profit, monitor the three-phase education treatment & reintegration program and organize ongoing research. The Global and Indian Board of Directors, consisting of notable professors and professionals, monitor the progress of MINDS and support the key values of the NGO. Lastly, the Advisors offer professional advice for program development and research.

In addition to the year-round team, board and advisors, MINDS runs a Leadership Development Development Program where interns from across the US partner with members of the core team to receive training and hands-on experience in marketing, publicity, research and program development. The program aims to develop future leaders in the non-profit arena.

For students and professionals looking for field experience, the MINDS Fellowship Program allows volunteers to work in Gujarat on research and programing projects.

== History ==
The MINDS Foundation was founded as nonprofit in August 2010 and is registered in Massachusetts as an NGO; additionally it partners with an NGO of the same name located in India, and thus is run through global offices. Currently MINDS runs programs in 19 villages in Gujarat and will expand to other villages in the near future.

In India, there is no official mental health policy and resources are extremely limited, with only 0.3 psychiatrists/100,000 people and just 0.06% of the national health budget going towards mental illness education and treatment. Furthermore, rural areas in India tend to be some of the most neglected: out of 626 districts in India, only 125 have any sort of mental health program in place. Health resources in India are usually funded, provided and accessed through the private sector.

== Partners and Sponsors ==
The MINDS Foundation partners with Mount Sinai School of Medicine for program advice and review. MINDS also partners with Sumandeep Vidyapeeth University, located just outside Vadodara. Starting in July 2011, MINDs began working with the Departments of Psychiatry and Community Medicine at Diharaj General Hospital, which provides treatment support and local staff.

The MINDS Foundation has campus chapters at Wesleyan University and at GlobeMed at University of Washington.

The MINDS Foundation also receives sponsorship, funding or donations from: The Mentor Network, The International Monetary Fund, Newman's Own Foundation, Gray Matters Capital, Google Grants, Hill Holiday, Korn Ferry International, Podio, The Salesforce Foundation, Fried Frank Legal Support, Proskauer Rose LLP, Thomson Reuters Foundation, Health Radio, The Next Mile Project, the Partricelli Center for Social Entrepreneurship, MC Mass Challenge, Dell Social Innovation Challenge, StartingBloc, mHealth Alliance and the Gulbenkian Mental Health Platform.
