= Malnutrition in India =

Despite India's 50% increase in GDP since 2013, more than one-third of the world's malnourished children live in India. Among these, half of the children under three years old are underweight.

One of the major causes for malnutrition in India is economic inequality. Due to the low economic status of some parts of the population, their diet often lacks in both quality and quantity. Women who are malnourished are less likely to have healthy babies. Nutrition deficiencies inflict long-term damage to both individuals and society. Compared with their better-fed peers, nutrition-deficient individuals are more likely to have infectious diseases such as pneumonia and tuberculosis, which lead to a higher mortality rate. Besides, nutrition-deficient individuals are less productive at work. Low productivity not only gives them low pay that traps them in a vicious circle of under-nutrition, but also brings inefficiency to the society, especially in India where labor is a major input factor for economic production. On the other hand, over-nutrition also has severe consequences. In India national obesity rates in 2010 were 14% for women and 18% for men with some urban areas having rates as high as 40%. Obesity causes several non-communicable diseases such as cardiovascular diseases, diabetes, cancers and chronic respiratory diseases.

== Causes ==
The World Bank estimates that India is one of the highest-ranking countries in the world for the number of children with malnutrition. The prevalence of underweight children in India is among the highest in the world and is nearly double that of Sub Saharan Africa with dire consequences for mobility, mortality, productivity, and economic growth.

The 2017 Global Hunger Index (GHI) Report by International Food Policy Research Institute (IFPRI) ranked India 100th out of 118 countries with a serious hunger situation. Amongst South Asian nations, it ranks third behind only Afghanistan and Pakistan with a GHI score of 29.0 ("serious situation"). The 2019 Global Hunger Index (GHI) report ranked India 102nd out of 117 countries with a serious issue of child wasting. At least one in five children under the age of five years in India is wasted.

India is one of the fastest growing countries in terms of population and economics, sitting at a population of 1.365 billion and growing at 1.5–1.7% annually (from 2001 to 2007). Though more than a quarter of the population is still living below the National Poverty Line its economic growth indicates new opportunities and a movement towards increase in the prevalence of chronic diseases which is observed in at high rates in developed countries such as United States, Canada and Australia. The combination of people living in poverty and the recent economic growth of India has led to the co-emergence of two types of malnutrition: undernutrition and overnutrition.

On the GHI, India is on place 67 among the 80 nations having the worst hunger situation which is worse than nations such as North Korea or Sudan. 25% of all hungry people worldwide live in India. Since 1990 there have been some improvements for children but the proportion of hungry in the population has increased. In India 44% of children under the age of 5 are underweight. 72% of infants and 52% of married women have anemia. Research has conclusively shown that malnutrition during pregnancy causes the child to have an increased risk of future diseases, physical retardation, and reduced cognitive abilities.

An estimated 23.6% of the population of India live below a purchasing power of $1.25 a day. This poverty does not directly lead to malnutrition but it leaves a large chunk of the population without adequate amounts of food. This makes a lack of access to food since people are too poor to go out and purchase it. According to the Registrar General of India, the mortality of children under the age of five was about 59 out of every 1000 live births which is one of the highest rates in the world. It is reported by Save the Children that this is mainly due to malnutrition in the children. Poor nutrition within the first thousand days of a child's life can have many negative causes to them. It can lead to stunted growth, impaired cognitive ability, reduced school performance, and diseases like diarrhea. According to a report, 68% of deaths in children under 5 years of age, in India, is due to malnutrition.

An IIT Delhi study found a link between anemia in children under the age of 5 and PM_{2.5} levels in air, with every 10 μg per cubic meter increase in PM_{2.5} levels being linked to a decrease in hemoglobin levels by 0.07 g/dL. A study published in Nature Sustainability says that long term exposure to high PM_{2.5} levels may be a cause of anemia among women, with their model showing a 7.23% increase in anemia among women of reproductive age for every 10 μg per cubic meter increase in PM_{2.5} exposure. The same study posits that India fulfilling its clean air targets would reduce the nationwide prevalence of anemia among women of reproductive age from 53% to 39.5%.

== Nutritional trends of various demographic groups ==
Many factors, including socio-economic status, region affect the nutritional status of Indians. Living in rural areas also contribute to nutritional status.

=== Socio-economic status ===
In general, those who are poor are at risk for under-nutrition, in India while those who have high socio-economic status are relatively more likely to be over-nourished. Anemia is negatively correlated with wealth.

When it comes to child malnutrition, children in low-income families are more malnourished than those in high-income families. The PDS system in India, solely distributes wheat and rice— cereals which provide insufficient protein (another cause of malnutrition). Cultural beliefs, such as religion, may also lead to malnutrition in some cases. Certain religious beliefs such as Hinduism and Sikhism may restrict the consumption of meat products. Other Indians may follow religions which prescribe a strictly vegan diet, refraining from the consumption of any sort of animal product, including dairy and eggs. This can, in some cases, lead to protein deficiency. In India, 56% of poor Indian households consume cereals to meet their protein intake. Studies have shown that the type of protein that cereals contain does not parallel to the proteins that animal products contain (Gulati, 2012). This phenomenon is most prevalent in the rural areas of India where more malnutrition exists on an absolute level. Whether children are of the appropriate weight and height is highly dependent on the socio-economic status of the population. Children of families with lower socioeconomic standing are faced with sub-optimal growth. While children in similar communities have shown to share similar levels of nutrition, child nutrition is also differential from family to family depending on the mother's characteristics, (Note: Explanatory variables of maternal characteristics used were: years of education; body mass index (BMI); anemia status; autonomy in seeking medical assistance for self; and place of birth for the child in the study.) household ethnicity, and place of residence. It is expected that with improvements in socio-economic welfare, child nutrition will also improve.

=== Region ===
Under-nutrition is more prevalent in rural areas, again mainly due to low socioeconomic status. Anemia for both men and women is only slightly higher in rural areas than in urban areas. For example, in 2005, 40% of women in rural areas, and 36% of women in urban areas were found to have mild anemia. In urban areas, overweight status and obesity are over three times as high as in rural areas.

In terms of geographical regions, Madhya Pradesh, Jharkhand, Andhra Pradesh, and Bihar have very high rates of under-nutrition. States with the lowest percentage of under-nutrition include Mizoram, Sikkim, Manipur, Kerala, Punjab, and Goa, although the rate is still considerably higher than that of developed nations. Further, anemia is found in over 70% of individuals in the states of Bihar, Chhattisgarh, Madhya Pradesh, Andhra Pradesh, Uttar Pradesh, Karnataka, Haryana, and Jharkhand. Less than 50% of individuals in Goa, Manipur, Mizoram, and Kerala have anaemia.

Punjab, Kerala, and Delhi face the highest rate of overweight and obese individuals.

=== Female population ===
==== Dual burden ====
Dual burden is characterized as undernutrition in the form of obesity or underweight, existing within an individual and/or at a societal level. On an individual level, a person can be obese, yet lack enough nutrients for proper nutrition. On a societal level, the dual burden refers to populations containing both overweight and underweight individuals co-existing. Women in India share a substantial proportion of the dual burden on malnutrition. The primary causes of whether a woman falls into the obese or underweight under-nutritional category is dependent on the socioeconomic status of the individual, and dependent on rural or urban populations. Women with higher economic means in urban areas fall into obese and overnourished category, while conversely lower income women in rural areas are underweight and undernourished. A consistent factor among dual burden outcomes relates primarily to food security issues. Access to healthy and nutritious foods within India has been increasingly replaced by a large supply of high-calorie, low-nutrient foods. The existence of the dual malnutrition problems suggests a need for policy makers to support options which measure nutritional output, as opposed to calories, when deciding policies to ensure a well fed society.

The NFHS-5 conducted in 2019–20 found the nationwide proportion of underweight women (BMI below 18.5) to be 18.7% and that of overweight (BMI between 25.0–29.9) and obese (BMI above or equal to 30.0) women to be 24%.

==== Anemia ====
The NFHS-5 found the prevalence of anemia among women (ages 15–49) to be 57% which was an increase of 4% from the previous NFHS-4. This was much higher than the prevalence rate of 25% observed among men of the same age group. The rate of anemia varied depending on the woman's maternity status, education, household wealth, and region. 61% of breast-feeding women were found to be anemic, while 52% of pregnant women were anemic. Prevalence of anemia was found to have decreased with schooling with 52% of women with 12 or more years of schooling being anemic as against 59% of those with no schooling. The rates decreased the most with wealth with 51% of women in the highest quintile being anemic as against 64% in the lowest quintile. Urban women were only marginally less anemic than rural women, while in states of Chhattisgarh, Bihar, Gujarat, Jharkhand, Odisha, West Bengal, Assam, and Tripura more than 60% of women were found to be anemic.

==== Domestic violence ====
A strong connection has been found between malnutrition and domestic violence, in particular high levels of anemia and undernutrition. Domestic violence comes in the form of psychological and physical abuse, as a control mechanism towards behaviors within families. This control affects a woman's autonomy to make decisions in regards to providing food, what type and amount, which leads to adverse nutrition results for herself, and family members. Psychological stress also affects anemia through a process labeled oxidative stress. In moments of high stress, free radicals are produced which attack healthy red blood cells, therefore lowering hemoglobin blood levels and producing anemic malnutrition. Additionally, physiological or chronic stress is strongly correlated in women being underweight.

=== Children ===
India has one of the worst rates of child malnutrition in the world, with one third of malnourished children globally being Indian. India's performance in child malnutrition has been worse than countries in its neighbourhood with similar per capita incomes, and social makeup. India loses up to 4% of its GDP and 8% of productivity due to child malnutrition, with estimates suggesting reducing child malnutrition alone can add 3% to India's GDP.

== Management ==
The Government of India has launched several programs to converge the growing rate of nutritious children. They include Integrated Child Development Services, the National Children's Fund (a program administered by the National Institute of Public Cooperation and Child Development), and the National Health Mission. To manage nutrition requirements especially following the COVID-19 pandemic, experts have recommended ways in which India can work towards nutrition security. These include setting up community kitchens, adding pulses and millets to the Public distribution system and continuing the school Midday Meal Scheme.

=== Midday meal scheme in Indian schools ===
The Indian government started the midday meal scheme on 15 August 1995. It serves millions of children with freshly cooked meals in almost all the government-run schools or schools aided by the government fund.

Apart from this, the International Society for Krishna Consciousness's (ISKCON) ISKCON Food Relief Foundation, the Nalabothu Foundation, and the Akshaya Patra Foundation run the world's largest NGO-run midday meal programs, each serving freshly cooked plant-based meals to over 1.3 million school children in government and government-aided schools in India. These programs are conducted with part subsidies from the government and partly with donations from individuals and corporations. The meals served by Food for Life Annamrita and Akshaya Patra comply with the nutritional norms given by the government of India and aims to eradicate malnutrition among children in India. Food for Life Annamrita (FFLA) is the premier affiliate of Food for Life Global, the world's largest free food relief network, with projects in over 60 countries.

=== Integrated child development scheme ===
The government of India started a program called Integrated Child Development Services (ICDS) in 1975. ICDS has been instrumental in improving the health of mothers and children under age 6 by providing health and nutrition education, health services, supplementary food, and pre-school education. ICDS is run by India's central government via the Ministry of Women and Child Development, targeting rural, urban, and tribal populations and has reached over 70 million young children and 16 million pregnant and lactating mothers.

Other programs impacting under-nutrition include the National Midday Meal Scheme, the National Rural Health Mission, and the Public Distribution System (PDS). The challenge for these programs and schemes is how to increase efficiency, impact, and coverage.

Bal Kuposhan Mukta Bihar (BKMB) is a campaign launched by the Department of Social Welfare, Government of Bihar in 2014.

The campaign is based on five "C":

- Communication for behavior change
- Capacity building
- Community's access to tangibles and intangibles
- Community participation and
- Collective approach.

The multi-pronged strategy shows that a health issue like malnutrition can be tackled with the help of behaviour change communication (BCC) and other social aspects.

=== National Children's Fund ===
The National Children's Fund was created during the International Year of the Child in 1979 under the Charitable Endowment Fund Act, 1890. This Fund provides support to voluntary organizations that help the welfare of kids.

=== National Plan of Action for Children ===
India is a signatory to the 27 survival and development goals laid down by the World Summit on children 1990. To implement these goals, the Department of Women & Child Development has formulated a National Plan of Action on Children. Each concerned Central Ministries/Departments, State Governments/U.Ts. and Voluntary Organisations dealing with women and children have been asked to take up appropriate measures to implement the Action Plan. These goals have been integrated into National Development Plans. A Monitoring Committee under the Chairpersonship of Secretary (Women & Child Development) reviews the achievement of goals set in the National Plan of Action. All concerned Central Ministries/Departments are represented on the committee.

Fifteen State Governments have prepared State Plan of Action on the lines of National Plan of Action specifying targets for 1995 as well as for 2000 and spelling out strategies for holistic child development.

=== United Nations International Children's Emergency Fund ===
Department of Women and Child Development is the nodal department for UNICEF. India is associated with UNICEF since 1949 and is now in the fifth decade of cooperation for assisting most disadvantaged children and their mothers. Traditionally, UNICEF has been supporting India in several sectors like child development, women's development, urban basic services, support for community-based convergent services, health, education, nutrition, water & sanitation, disabled children, children in especially difficult circumstances, information and communication, planning and program support. India was a member of the UNICEF Executive Board until 31 December 1997. The board has three regular sessions and one annual session in a year. Strategies and other important matters relating to UNICEF are discussed in those meetings. A meeting of Government of India and UNICEF officials concurred on 12 November 1997 to finalize the strategy and areas for the program of cooperation for the next Master Plan of operations 1999–2002 which is to synchronize with the Ninth Plan of Government of India.

== Combating malnutrition with strategy ==
A Mangalorean doctor Edmond Fernandes piloted a project curated through the Edward & Cynthia Institute of Public Health in collaboration with Women and Child Minister of Karnataka Halappa Achar from the BJP and demonstrated proof of concept to End Malnutrition burden in India.

== National Health Mission ==
=== National Rural Health Mission ===
The National Rural Health Mission of India mission was created for the years 2005–2012, and its goal is to "improve the availability of and access to quality health care by people, especially for those residing in rural areas, the poor, women, and children."

The subset of goals under this mission is:

1. Reduce infant mortality rate (IMR) and maternal mortality ratio (MMR), Neonatal mortality rate (NMR)
2. Provide universal access to public health services
3. Prevent and control both communicable and non-communicable diseases, including locally endemic diseases
4. Provide access to integrated comprehensive primary healthcare
5. Create population stabilization, as well as gender and demographic balance
6. Revitalize local health traditions and mainstream AYUSH
7. Finally, to promote healthy lifestyles

The mission has set up strategies and action plan to meet all of its goals.

== See also ==
- Obesity in India
- Health in India
