= Kala azar in India =

Kala azar (Visceral leishmaniasis) in India refers to the special circumstances of the disease kala azar as it exists in India. Kala azar is a major health problem in India with an estimated 146,700 new cases per year as of 2012. In the disease a parasite causes sickness after migrating to internal organs such as the liver, spleen and bone marrow. If left untreated the disease almost always results in the death. Signs and symptoms include fever, weight loss, fatigue, anemia, and substantial swelling of the liver and spleen.

People get the disease from the bites of sandflies which themselves got a parasite from drinking blood of another person infected with the parasite. Globally there are more than 20 different Leishmania parasites which cause the disease and 90 species of sandfly which spread those parasites. In the Indian subcontinent, however, there is only one common species of parasite, Leishmania donovani and only one species of sandfly, Phlebotomus argentipes, which spreads the disease. The form of the disease, the medicine for eliminating the parasite, and insecticide for preventing the insect bite varies by region, and there are recommendations in place for India.

Besides the personal cost, the disease has a great economic cost to the affected communities and India in general.

== Etymology ==
Kala-azar (Hindustani: काला आज़ार (Devanagari) کالا آزار (Nastaleeq) kālā āzār), is derived from kala which means black in Sanskrit, as well as in the languages descended from it, including Hindi and Urdu; the word azar is a Persian loanword in Hindustani that means "fever"; as such the disease is named for the darkening of the skin on the extremities and abdomen that occurs in the disease. It is also pronounced kālāzar (कालाज़ार کالا زار).

== Types ==
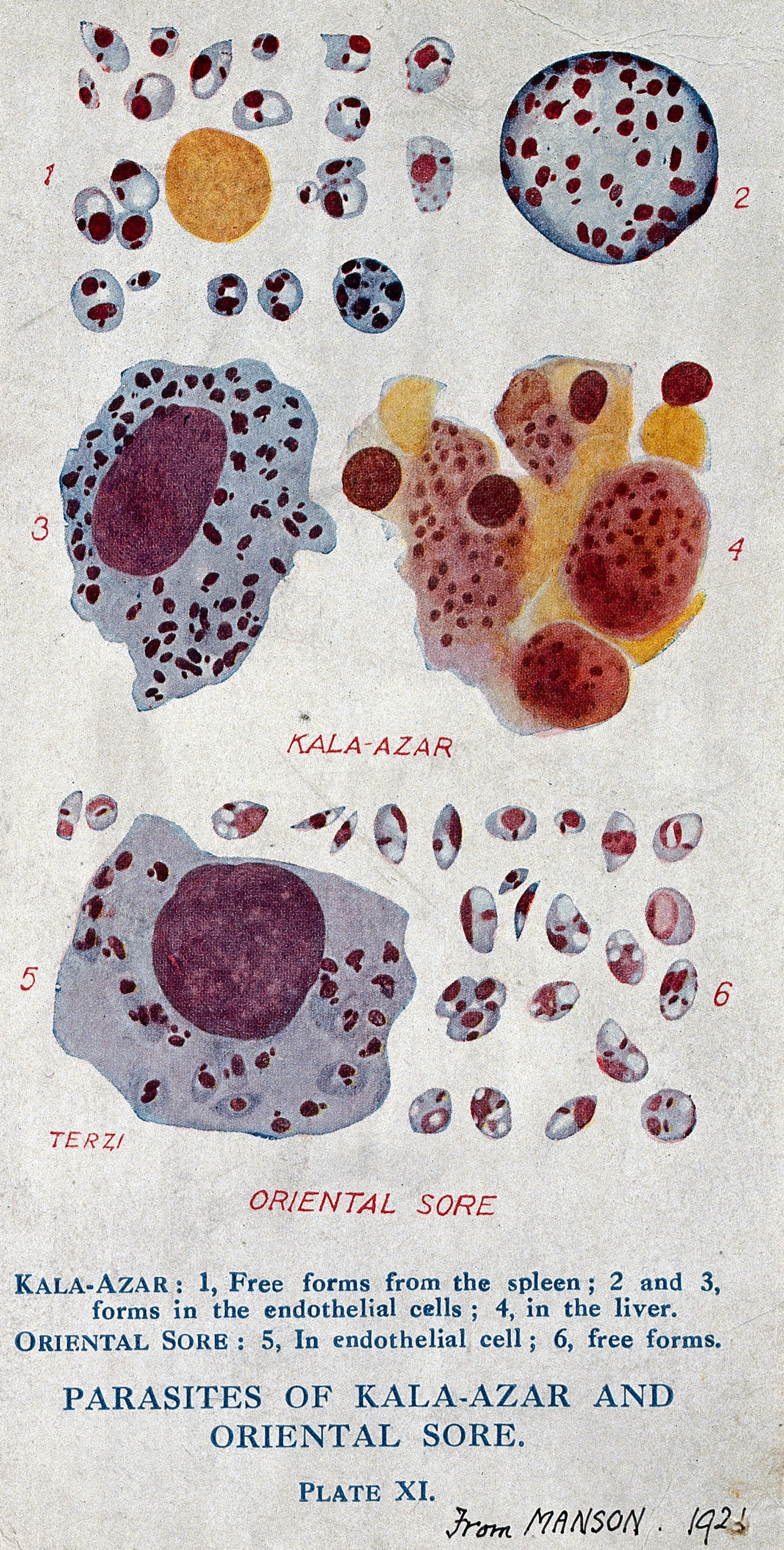
Kala azar causes various changes in the body

A 2012 report based on 2004-8 data estimated that the number of new annual cases of kala azar was at least 146,000 in India, 12,000 in Bangladesh, and 3,000 in Nepal. Among all the people the subcontinent carrying infection, 10% have kala azar, 10% have PKDL, and 80% are asymptomatic.

=== Kala azar ===
Kala azar, also called visceral leishmaniasis, is a disease in which a parasite migrates to the internal organs such as the liver, spleen (hence "visceral"), and bone marrow. If left untreated, will almost always result in the death of the host. Signs and symptoms include fever, weight loss, fatigue, anemia, and substantial swelling of the liver and spleen.

Among people with kala azar, there is variation in the symptoms, and some people can have unusual symptoms.

=== Asymptomatic kala azar ===
Asymptomatic kala azar (also called asymptomatic Leishmania infection) occurs when someone has the infection but does not show symptoms.

For every 1 person with kala azar symptoms, 4–17 people may have asymptomatic kala azar. Risk of asymptomatic kala azar is high for anyone in close contact with a person with kala azar. Most people who would test positive for asymptomatic kala azar will clear the infection naturally. Between 1–23% of asymptomatic people will develop kala azar within 1 year.

=== Post-kala-azar dermal leishmaniasis ===
Post-kala-azar dermal leishmaniasis (PKDL) is a complication of visceral leishmaniasis (VL); it is characterised by a macular, maculopapular, and nodular rash in a patient who has recovered from VL and who is otherwise well. Despite being called "post kala azar", 29% of cases appear from people who never had kala azar, and who had an asymptomatic infection previously.

== Vector ==
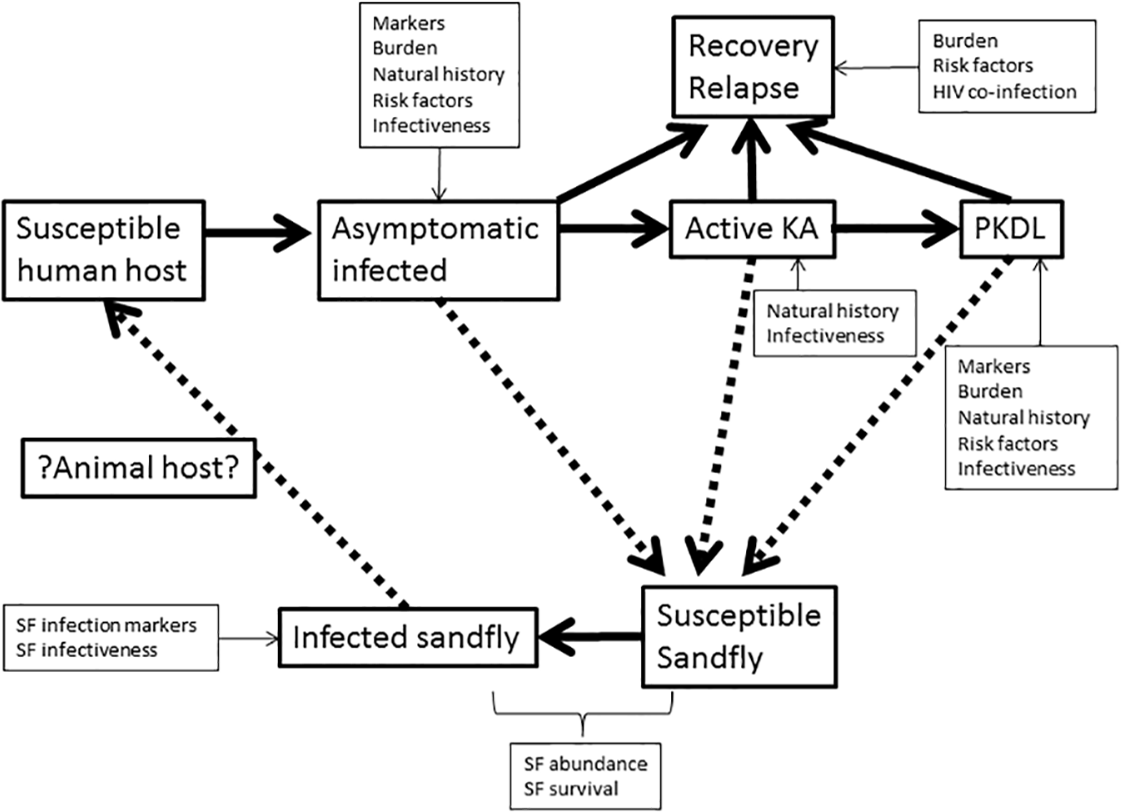
diagram of how kala azar spreads in India

In various places in the world different sandflies transmit different Leishmania parasites which cause different variations of kala azar. In the Indian subcontinent the particular sandfly is Phlebotomus argentipes and it transmits Leishmania donovani. One part of preventing the disease in India is preventing the insect bite.

A challenge with preventing the insect bite is lack of ecological data and lack of information about the life of the insect. Ecological information which would predict when and where sandflies live include temperature, rain, wind speed, Relative humidity, soil moisture, pH, and total organic carbon. If that information were available, then it would be easier to study when insects bite, how they choose to bite either animals or humans, and where they breed. Knowing about insect life and behavior would increase efficiency and lower cost of public health programmes to prevent kala azar.

Using insecticide treated nets in 90% of the households in districts with kala azar could be an effective part of controlling the spread of disease.

There is no evidence that animals are a major concern for spread of kala azar. Tests of cattle, buffalo, chickens, wild rats, and dogs found little or no infection. There is some evidence that goats could be reservoirs of infection.

== Treatment ==
Kala azar is a community problem and requires individual and community participation in treatment. Treatment starts with healthcare workers seeking people with the disease. There is testing in clinics but also in the field. Preferred treatment is a single injection of liposomal amphotericin B at a clinic on the same day as testing and diagnosis. By doing everything in one visit, people will be able to easily complete treatment. Even after treatment, people may require a follow up including some combination therapy. Some people may require an alternative therapy and other drugs are effective.

Miltefosine is the only available oral medication available for VL and PKDL. While the drug works for short term treatment of VL, PKDL would require a longer treatment of more than 28 days with this drug. Miltefosine is not recommended for use as a monotherapy to treat PKDL.

== Elimination of disease ==
The eradication of kala azar in India is achievable and there are favorable circumstances for doing so. Humans are the only reservoir host in this region for the parasite causing the disease. The only way the disease spreads from human to human is by one insect in the region, Phlebotomus argentipes. As of 2009, the disease only existed in 109 districts in India, Bangladesh, and Nepal. The disease is easy to diagnose, even in the field and outside of a clinic. When testing identifies a patient with the condition, then available drugs are completely effective in removing the parasite.

The current goal for eliminating the disease is to have its rate below 1 in 10,000 people by 2020.

One part of the elimination strategy was to reduce sandflies as a vector by giving mosquito nets treated with DDT along with programs for early case detection and treatment.

=== Challenges ===
Major challenges in eliminating kala azar is lack of access to health care, planning for drug resistance, the absence of a kala azar vaccine, and the difficulty in controlling the insect spreading the infection. Progress in diagnosis, treatment, and the development of a vaccine is significant and is guiding the elimination planning. A program to eliminate kala azar would only work with strong support from local communities. Public health surveillance is necessary for years to identify cases as soon as possible for treatment and to prevent spread.

Humans with the parasite are reservoirs of infection which could revive the disease even if it seems eliminated. People with asymptomatic kala azar can still spread the disease and so can people who seem cured of kala azar, but who later development PKDL.

Potential great dangers to elimination are drug resistance and pesticide resistance and a need for pharmacovigilance to ensure drug safety for using the medications.

=== Public health programs ===
The India National Health Policy, 2002 set a goal to eliminate kala azar by 2010. The Central Government of India started supporting states with case registration in 2003. In 2005 the governments of India, Nepal, and Bangladesh started an initiative with the World Health Organization to collaborate in eliminating kala azar in the region.

India changed the target year to 2015. When the year came there was uncertainty that the goal would be met. In February 2015 the health ministers of India, Bangladesh, and Nepal joined with the health ministers of Thailand and Bhutan to set a new target date to eliminate kala azar by 2017.

== History ==
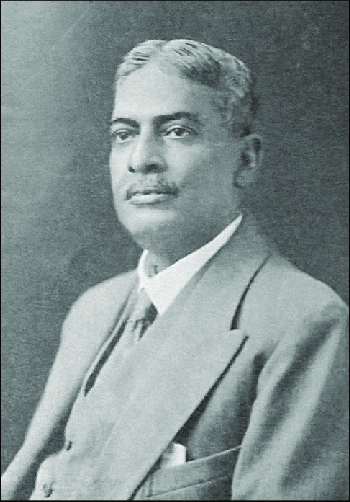
Upendranath Brahmachari researched kala-azar in Kolkata

The miracle of urea stibamine, drawn by Upendranath Brahmachari himself. The death rate is drastically declined from nearly 6300 to 750 within ten years in Assam.

India has long been involved in drug development for kala azar.

William Twining, an East India Company military physician, wrote a modern medical description of kala azar in 1835.

In 1903 William Boog Leishman, a British Army medical officer, reported from Dum Dum near Calcutta identifying parasites which cause kala azar. His report was correct, and scientists gave his name to the parasite Leishmania and to the Western name of the disease, leishmaniasis.

Bengali physician and scientist Upendranath Brahmachari treated, researched, and published about kala-azar until his death in 1946.

India's National Malaria Eradication Programme was using DDT between 1953 and 1964 as the insecticide to prevent malaria. DDT is highly effective was banned for also being toxic to humans and the environment. When India was using DDT, that effort to reduce malaria also killed sandflies and prevented kala azar. After 1964 and the halt of DDT use, kala azar returned, but physicians no longer recognized the disease after its absence.

From about 1960–1975, there were no records of kala azar in the subcontinent. In 1978 in Nepal, people reported the disease. From 1980 the disease spread among many people.

== Special populations ==
Quackery is common enough to be a significant problem in treating the disease. The government seeks to make official clinics accessible, but many people take services from unlicensed medical practitioners.

Men are more likely than women to get kala azar.

Children with kala azar have the same symptoms as adults. Miltefosine is as effective and well tolerated as a treatment in children as adults and can be a first line treatment. 90% of the cases of kala azar are in Bihar, and children there have the burden of 50% of the loss of disability adjusted life years.

HIV-positive people have a greater risk of reinfection of kala azar.

== Further consideration ==
- National Vector Borne Disease Control Programme. "National Kala-azar Elimination Programme". nvbdcp.gov.in. Ministry of Health and Family Welfare.
- Regional Office for South-East Asia (2012), Regional strategic framework for elimination of kala-azar from the South-East Asia Region (2011–2015), New Delhi: World Health Organization, hdl:10665/205826
- National Vector Bourne Disease Control Programme (February 2017), Accelerated Plan for Kala-azar Elimination 2017 (PDF), Ministry of Health and Family Welfare
