= Health in India =

Historical development of life expectancy, 1881 to 2019

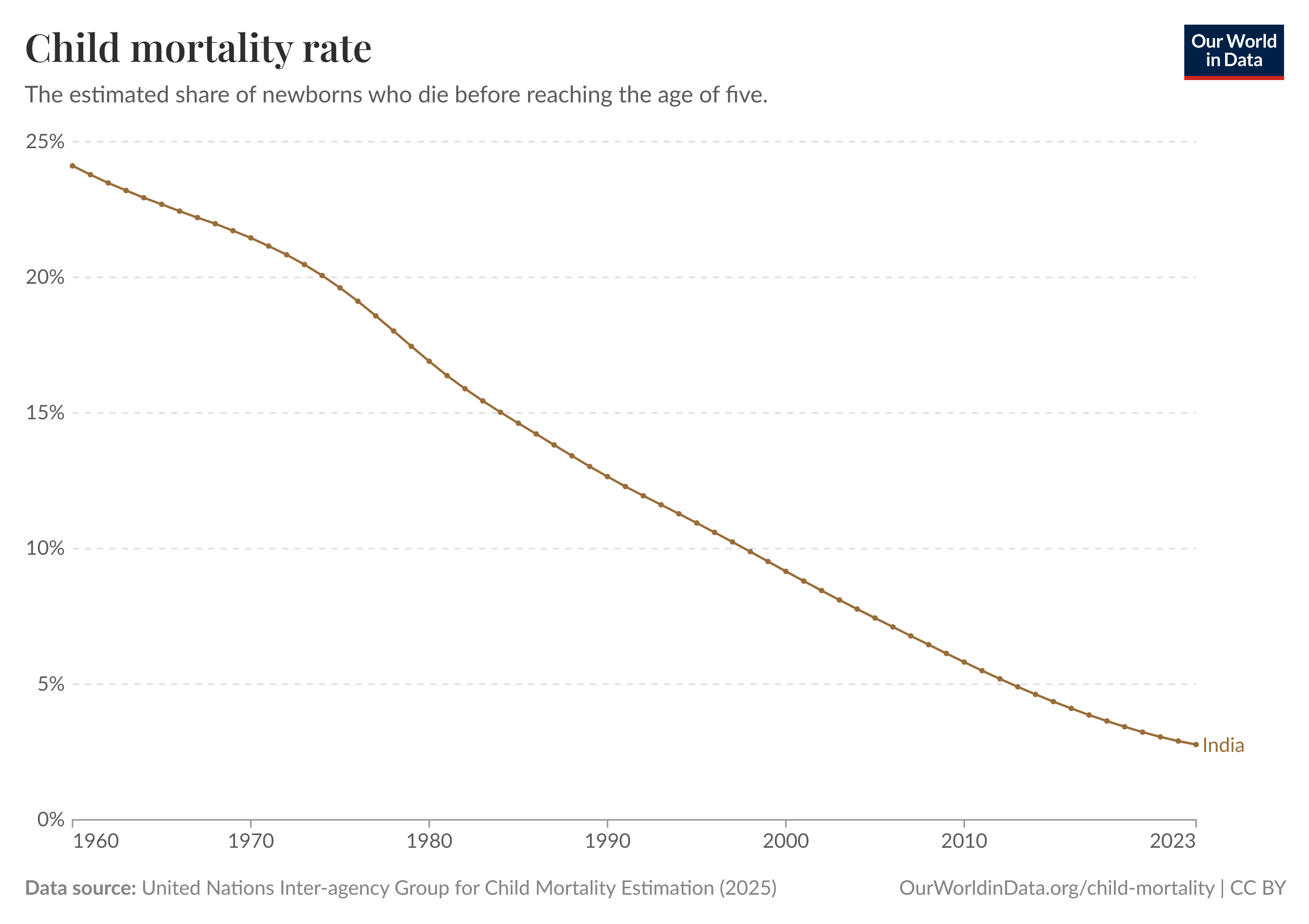
Development of child mortality rate in India since 1960

India's population in 2024 as per World Bank is 1.45 billion. Being the world's most populous country and one of its fastest-growing economies, India experiences both challenges and opportunities in context of public health. India is a hub for pharmaceutical and biotechnology industries; world-class scientists, clinical trials and hospitals yet country faces daunting public health challenges like child undernutrition, neonatal and maternal mortality, rising non‑communicable diseases, and road traffic accident cases.

The Human Rights Measurement Initiative finds that India is fulfilling 80.5% of what it should be fulfilling for the right to health based on its level of income. When looking at the right to health with respect to children, India achieves 92.1% of what is expected based on its current income. In regards to the right to health amongst the adult population, the country achieves only 85.6% of what is expected based on the nation's level of income. India falls into the "very bad" category when evaluating the right to reproductive health because the nation is fulfilling only 63.7% of what the nation is expected to achieve based on the resources (income) it has available.

== Major health indicators ==
The life expectancy at birth has increased from 49.7 years in 1970–1975 to 67.9 years in 2010–2014. For the same period, the life expectancy for females is 69.6 year and 66.4 years for males. In 2018, the life expectancy at birth is said to be 69.1 years.

The infant mortality rate has declined from 74 per 1,000 live births in 1994 to 37 per 1,000 live births in 2015. However, the differentials of rural (41) and urban (25) as of 2015 are still high. In 2016, the infant mortality rate was estimated to be 34.6 per 1,000 live births.

The under-five mortality rate for the country was 113 per 1,000 live births in 1994 whereas in 2018 it reduced to 41.1 per 1,000 live births.

The maternal mortality ratio has declined from 212 per 100 000 live births in 2007–2009 to 167 per 100 000 live births in 2011–2013. However, the differentials for state Kerala (61) and Assam (300) as of 2011–2013 are still high. In 2013, the maternal mortality ratio was estimated to be 190 per 100 000 live births.

The total fertility rate for the country was 2.3 in rural areas whereas it has been 1.8 in urban areas during 2015.

The most common cause of disability adjusted life years lost for Indian citizens as of 2016 for all ages and sexes was ischemic heart disease (accounting for 8.66% of total DALYs ), 2nd chronic obstructive pulmonary disease (accounting for 4.81% of total DALYs), 3rd diarrhea (accounting for 4.64% of total DALYs) and 4th lower respiratory infections (accounting for 4.35% of total DALYs).

As per the figures about the child mortality rate which is quite a big hurdle for the government, the 2nd most common cause of DALYs lost for children under 5 years of age was diseases like diarrhea, lower respiratory tract infections and other communicable diseases (accounting for 22,598.71 DALYs per 100 000 population) as of 2016 which can be preventable.

A demographic study found that, compared to 2019, life expectancy at birth was 2.6 years lower and mortality was 17% higher in 2020, implying 1.19 million excess deaths in 2020. The study also found, in contrast to global patterns, females in India experienced a life expectancy decline that was 1 year larger than losses for males. In addition, the researchers found that in 2020, the life expectancy of an upper-caste Hindu dropped 1.3 years, compared to 2.7 years for those of a 'scheduled caste' and 5.4 years for Indian Muslims. The study results were contested by the Government of India.

== Health conditions and risk factors ==
=== Oral health in India ===
Oral health refers to optimum functioning of mouth (smile, swallow, chew, taste, etc.), proper dentition and ability to perform various movements of facial muscles, jaws and other orofacial structures without pain and discomfort.

Status of oral health both affects and gets affected by specific systemic health conditions. Many systemic diseases, such as; diabetes, can be suspected by examining oral signs and symptoms. Poor oral health is also a risk factor of cardio-vascular diseases, stroke, digestive issues, pre-term birth, low birth weight, preeclampsia etc.

According to Global Oral Health Status Report: Towards Universal Health Coverage for Oral Health by 2030 (WHO report), Globally, oral diseases affect 3.5 billion people and every three out of four people lives in middle-income countries. In India, there has been a steady increase in the burden of oral diseases since last two decades. High prevalence of dental caries is notable among children and adults, due to high sugar consumption. It subsequently leads to high prevalence of periodontal diseases and edentulism.

Squamous cell carcinoma is the most common form of oral cancer in India and primarily affects middle age population (31–50 years). Epidemiologically, Kerala has the lowest and West Bengal has the highest incidence of oral cancer. For India, self-examination is the most effective method for early diagnosis of oral cancer.

Risk factors for all kind of dental diseases include; high dietary sugar, areca nut, alcohol and tobacco (gutkha, khaini, mawa, etc.) consumption, smoking, etc.

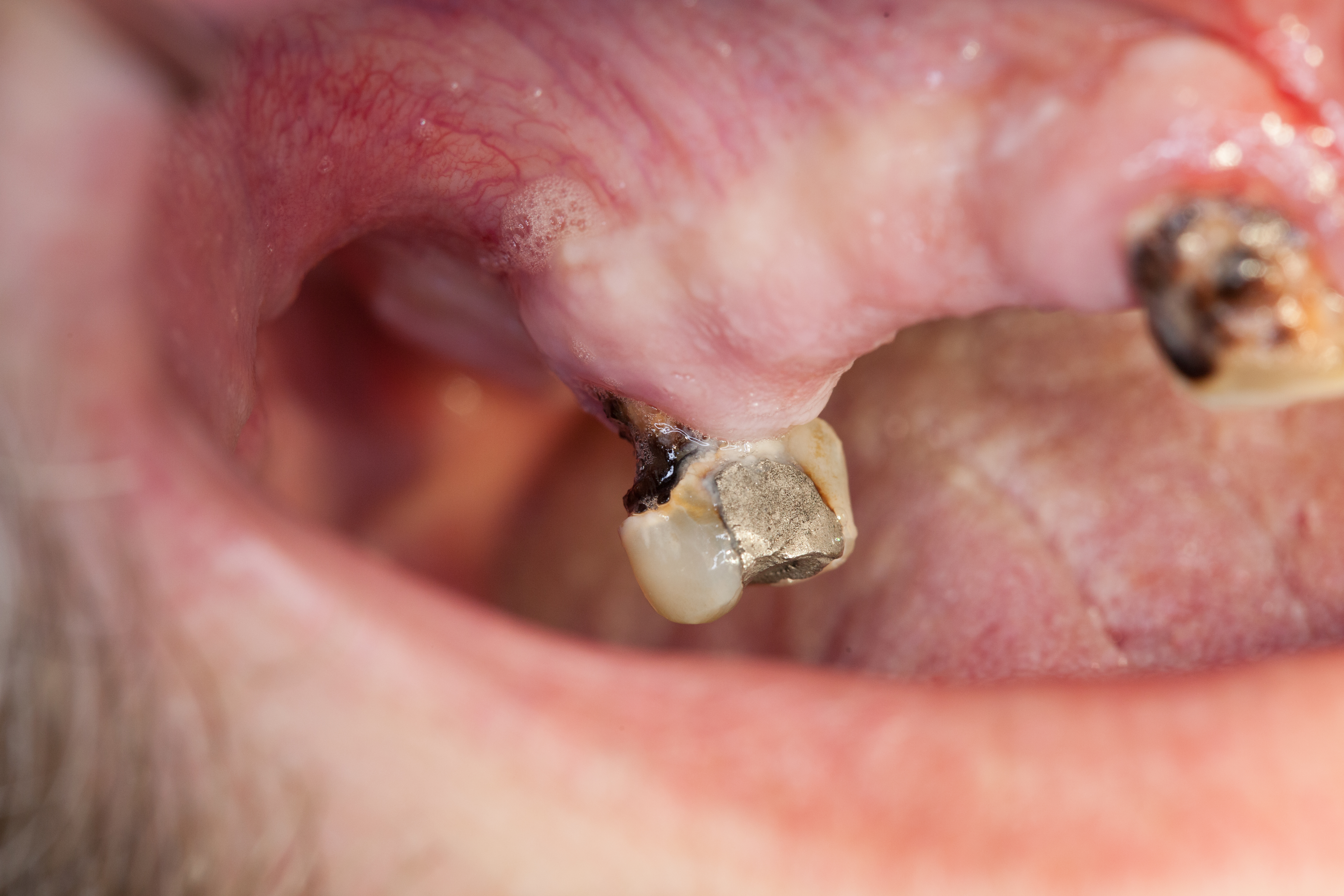
Dental caries with partial edentulism

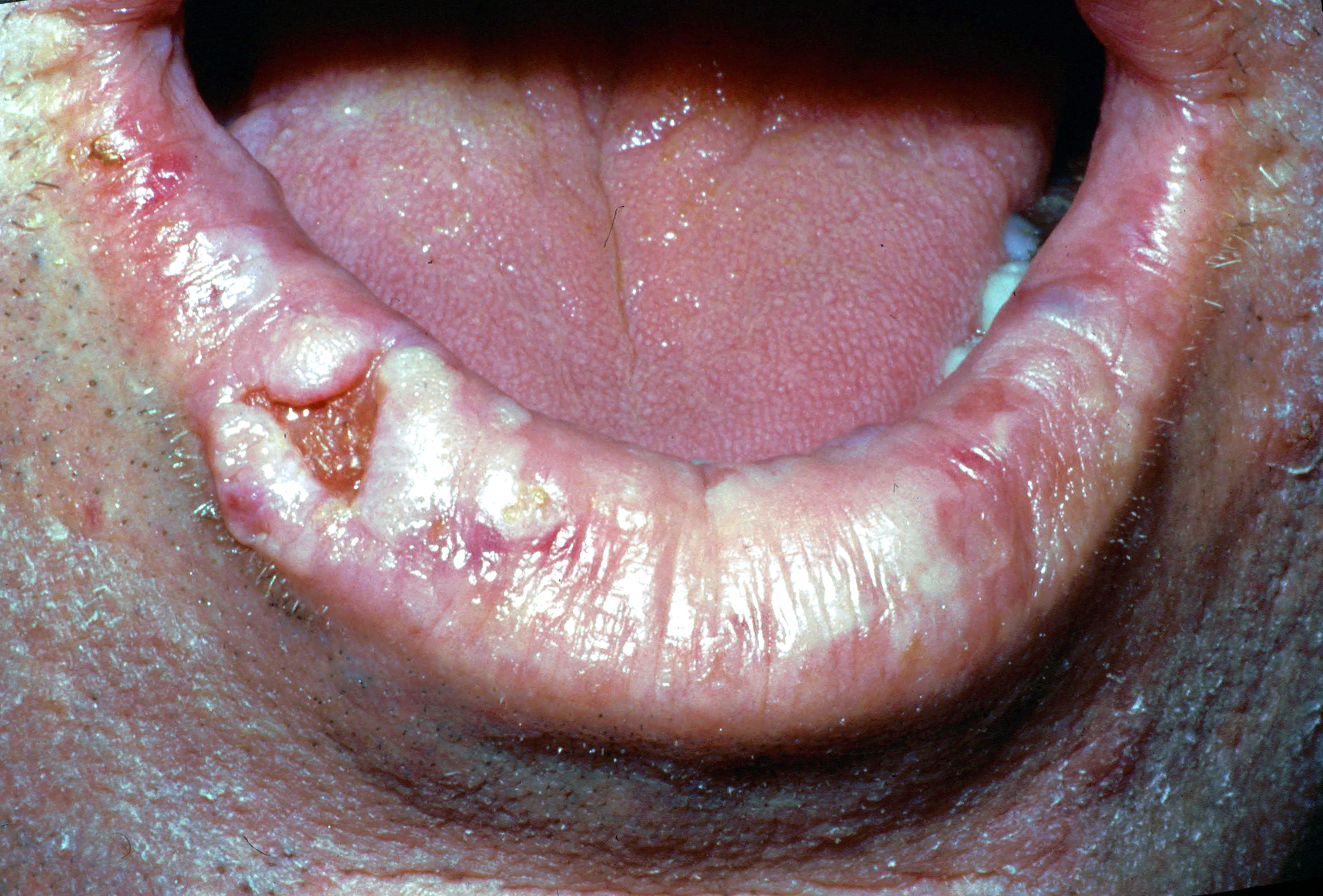
Lower Lip Cancer

According to the WHO 'oral health country profile' below is the prevalence of main oral health issues:

Oral Disease Burden in India (2019)
Oral Health Issue	Prevalence (%)
Untreated caries of deciduous teeth in children (1–9 years)	43.3
Untreated caries of permanent teeth in people (5+ years)	28.8
Severe periodontal disease in people (15+ years)	21.8
Edentulism in people (20+ years)	4

Oral and lip cancer (2020)
	Male	Female	Total
Number of new cases	104,661	31,268	135,929
Incidence rate (%)	14.8	4.6	9.8

Prevalence of Risk Factors (WHO, 2019)
Risk Factor	Male	Female	Total
Per capita availability of sugar (g/day)	....	....	53.8
Prevalence of current tobacco use, 15+ years (%)	42.4	13.7	28.1
Per capita alcohol consumption, 15+ years (litres of pure alcohol/year)	9.1	1.9	5.6

Root Issues

However, the number of dentists in 2011 was 117,825 and approximate number for 2020 is 309,700, but still, majority people are devoid of proper dental treatment. Reasons for this gap, 1) unequal distribution of dentists in urban (70%) and rural (30%) areas, 2) 90% services provided by private practitioners and only 10% through the government settings, and 3) Negligeable % of insurance coverage for dental treatments. As a result, oral diseases cause high economic burden.

Possible solutions

- Limit sugar, tobacco, alcohol and araca nut consumption through awareness programs
- Promotion of the use of fluoride containing toothpaste
- Oral health promotion programs
- Public-Private partnership
- Well-structured oral health surveys
- Integration of oral health with medical health

=== Malnutrition ===
Malnutrition refers to deficiencies, excesses or imbalances in a person's intake of energy and/or nutrients. The term malnutrition covers 2 broad groups of conditions. One is undernutrition – which includes stunting (low height for age), wasting (low weight for height), underweight (low weight for age) and micronutrient deficiencies or insufficiencies (a lack of important vitamins and minerals). The other is overweight – overweight, obesity and diet-related noncommunicable diseases (such as heart disease, stroke, diabetes and cancer).

According to a 2005 report, 60% of India's children below the age of three were malnourished, which was greater than the statistics of sub-Saharan African of 28%. World Bank data indicates that India has one of the world's highest demographics of children suffering from malnutrition – said to be double that of sub-Saharan Africa with dire consequences. India's Global Hunger Index India ranking of 67, the 80 nations with the worst hunger situation places it even below North Korea or Sudan. 44% of children under the age of 5 are underweight, while 72% of infants have anemia. It is considered that one in three malnourished children live in India.

States where malnutrition is prominent:

1. Uttar Pradesh: Most children here, in India's densest state by population, under the age of 5 are stunted due to malnutrition.
2. Tamil Nadu: The state, despite high education, has a prominent child malnutrition problem. A National Family Health Survey reveals that 23% of children here are underweight, while 25% of Chennai children show moderately stunted growth.
3. Madhya Pradesh: 2015 data reveals that Madhya Pradesh has India's highest number of malnourished children – 74.1% of them under 6 suffer from anemia, and 60% have to deal with malnutrition.
4. Jharkhand and Bihar: At 56.5%, Jharkhand has India's second highest number of malnourished children. This is followed by Bihar, at 55.9%.

==== Forms ====
- Protein–energy malnutrition (PEM): also known as protein-calorie malnutrition
- Iron-deficiency: nutritional anemia which can lead to lessened productivity, sometimes becoming terminal
- Vitamin A deficiency: which can lead to blindness or a weakened immune system
- Iodine deficiency: which can lead to serious mental or physical complaints
- Vitamin B complex deficiency: can lead to insufficient birth weight or congenital anomalies such as spina bifida.

==== In children ====
Infants and preschool children
Condition	Prevalence %
Low birth weight	22
Kwashiorkor/Marasmus^{#}	<1
Bitot's spots^{#}	0.8–1.0
Iron deficiency anaemia (6–59 months)	70.0
Underweight (weight for age)* (<5 years)^{#}	42.6
Stunting (height for age)* (<5 years)^{#}	48.0
Wasting (weight for height)*^{#}	20.0
Childhood overweight/obesity	6–30

* : <Median -2SD of WHO Child Growth Standards

^{#} : NNMB Rural Survey – 2005–06

A well-nourished child is one whose weight and height measurements compare very well within the standard normal distribution of heights and weights of healthy children of same age and sex. A child without sufficient nutrients in its daily intake is not only exposed to physical and motor growth delays, but also to heightened risk of mortality, reduced immune defenses and decreased cognitive and learning capacities. Malnutrition can negatively impact long-term health and socio-economic outcomes. As with serious malnutrition, growth delays also hinder a child's intellectual development. Sick children with chronic malnutrition, especially when accompanied by anemia, often have a lower learning capacity during the crucial first years of attending school.

==== In adults ====
Adults (prevalence)
Condition	Unit	Males			Females		
Condition	Unit	Urban	Rural^{#}	Tribal^{^}	Urban	Rural^{#}	Tribal^{^}
Chronic energy deficiency (BMI <18.5)	%		33.2	40.0		36.0	49.0
Anaemia in women (including pregnant women)	%				75		
Iodine deficiency - Goitre	millions	54					
Iodine deficiency – Cretinism	millions	2.2					
Iodine deficiency – Still births (includes neo-natal deaths)		90,000					
Obesity related chronic diseases (BMI >25)	%	36.0	7.8	2.4	40.0	10.9	3.2
Hypertension	%	35.0	25.0	25.0	35.0	24.0	23.0
Diabetes mellitus (year 2006)	%	16.0	5.0		16	5.0	
Coronary heart disease	%	7–9	3–5		7–9	3–5	
Cancer incidence rate	per million	113			123		

* : <Median -2SD of WHO Child Growth Standards

^{#} : NNMB Rural Survey – 2005–06

^{^} : NNMB Tribal Survey – 2008–09

Due to their lower social status, girls are far more at risk of malnutrition than boys of their age. Partly as a result of this cultural bias, up to one third of all adult women in India are underweight. Inadequate care of these women already underdeveloped, especially during pregnancy, leads them in turn to deliver underweight babies who are vulnerable to further malnutrition and disease.

=== Obesity ===
Obesity in India has grown to epidemic levels in India in the 21st century, with morbid obesity affecting 5% of the population.

One factor that may impact the rise of obesity in India is the growing establishment of fast-food and mithai shops within India. Fast-food is among one of India's largest growing markets, especially amid the COVID-19 pandemic where it saw tremendous growth due to the speed of service and no-contact model. Moreover, the rise of food-delivery apps such as Zomato and Swiggy in India has allowed access to fast-foods on an unparalleled level in India. By increasing the ease of access to such unhealthy foods, Indians are more likely than ever before to choose such options rather than cooking at home. In 2021, the most ordered-foods on Swiggy were biryani and paneer butter masala, both of which are highly fattening when ordered from restaurants. Such delivery apps also use what some may consider predatory business tactics to hook customers on to their services. First time customers are offered a month's worth of free delivery and discounts to build their reliance on delivery apps, so even after the trial ends the customers continue paying and ordering food. Even prior to COVID and online food ordering services, fast food has been readily available around the streets of Indian cities, just minutes away from most residential areas. Ever since McDonalds entered India in 1996, numerous fast food chains have followed suit including Dominos, Pizza Hut, Burger King, and KFC.

=== Communicable diseases ===
Diseases such as dengue fever, hepatitis, tuberculosis, malaria and pneumonia continue to plague India due to increased resistance to drugs.

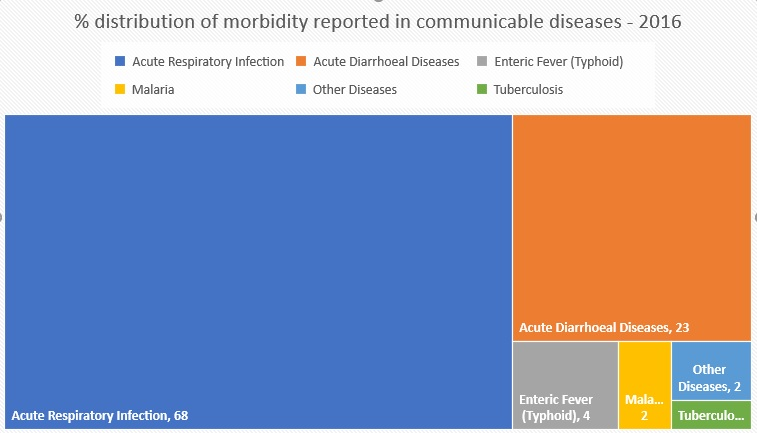
This diagram shows the percentage distribution of morbidity reported in communicable diseases in 2016 in India according to the National Health Profile 2017

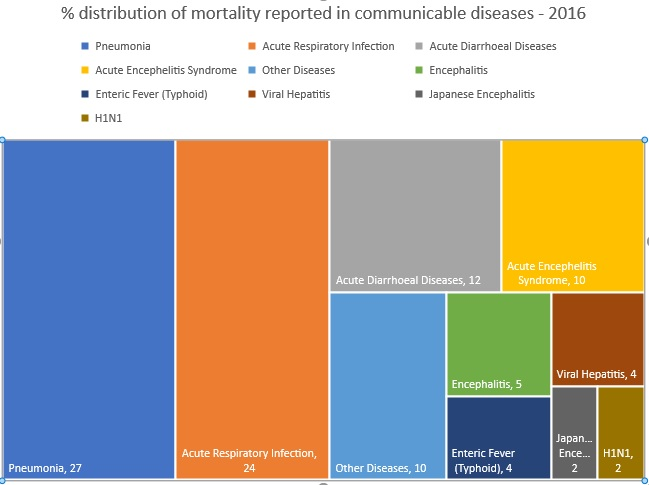
This diagram shows the percentage distribution of mortality reported in communicable diseases in 2016 in India according to the National Health Profile 2017

In 2011, India reported a 'totally drug-resistant' form of tuberculosis . India is the highest TB burden country in the world in terms of absolute number of incident cases that occur each year. TB primarily affects people in their most productive years of life. While two-thirds of the cases are male, TB takes disproportionately larger toll among young females, with more than 60 per cent of female cases occurring by the age of 34 years. In 2018, the TrueNat test, an indigenously developed technology under the "Make in India" initiative, was deployed in about 350 PHCs. This led to marked increase in access to highly sensitive molecular tests with augmented capacity for resistance testing at the peripheral level.

HIV/AIDS in India is ranked third highest among countries with HIV-infected patients. National AIDS Control Organisation, a government apex body is making efforts for managing the HIV/AIDS epidemic in India. Diarrheal diseases are the primary causes of early childhood mortality. These diseases can be attributed to poor sanitation and inadequate safe drinking water. India has the world's highest incidence of rabies. Malaria has been a seasonal health problem in India from a very long time. The maximum number of malaria cases and deaths have been reported mostly form the rural parts of Orissa. The overall prevalence of the disease has diminished in 2012 and 2013 however there is a slight increase in 2014 and again started decreasing from 2015. WHO (World Health Organization) adopted a strategy in May-2015, that provides a technical guidance to countries emphasizing the importance of scaling up malaria responses and moving towards elimination of malaria. This is known as The Global Technical Strategy for Malaria (2016-2030). A major scale-up of malaria responses will not only help countries reach the health-related targets for 2030, but will contribute to poverty reduction and other development goals.

Kala-azar is the second largest parasitic killer in the world. Most of the cases (76%) were found in Bihar in 2016. Dengue and chikungunya transmitted by Aedes mosquitoes, is another problem of concern in India. Dengue outbreaks have continued since the 1950s but severity of disease has increased in the last two decades. In 2016, India reported a total of 58,264 cases of chikungunya. Chicken pox is a highly contagious and a viral infection which breaks out in many parts of India. Cases were reported to be 61,118 & deaths to be 60 in 2016.

In 2012, India was polio-free for the first time in its history. This was achieved because of the Pulse Polio programme started in 1995–96 by the government.

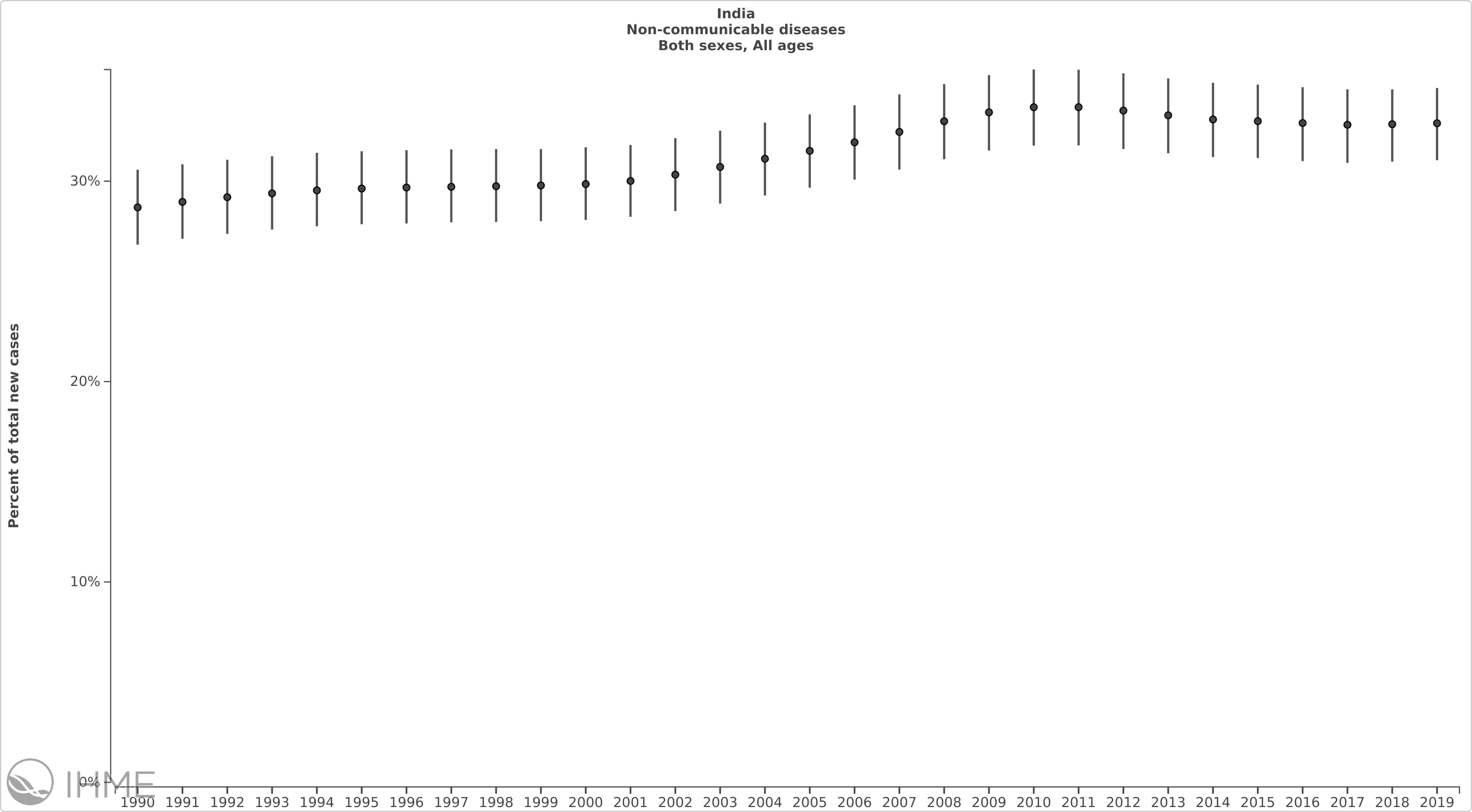
NCD incidence rates from 1990 to 2019 in India according to IHME (Institute of Health Metrics and Evaluation)

=== Non-communicable diseases ===
India has witnessed huge progress in the health status of its population since independence. The transition has been seen in economic development, nutritional status, fertility and mortality rates and consequently, the disease profile has changed considerably. Although great efforts have been done to control the communicable diseases, but they still contribute significantly to disease burden of the country. Decline in disability and death from communicable diseases has been accompanied by a gradual shift to, and accelerated rise in the prevalence of chronic non-communicable diseases such as cardiovascular disease, diabetes, chronic obstructive pulmonary disease, cancers, mental health disorders and injuries. Indians are at particularly high risk for atherosclerosis and coronary artery disease. This may be attributed to a genetic predisposition to metabolic syndrome and adverse changes in coronary artery vasodilation.

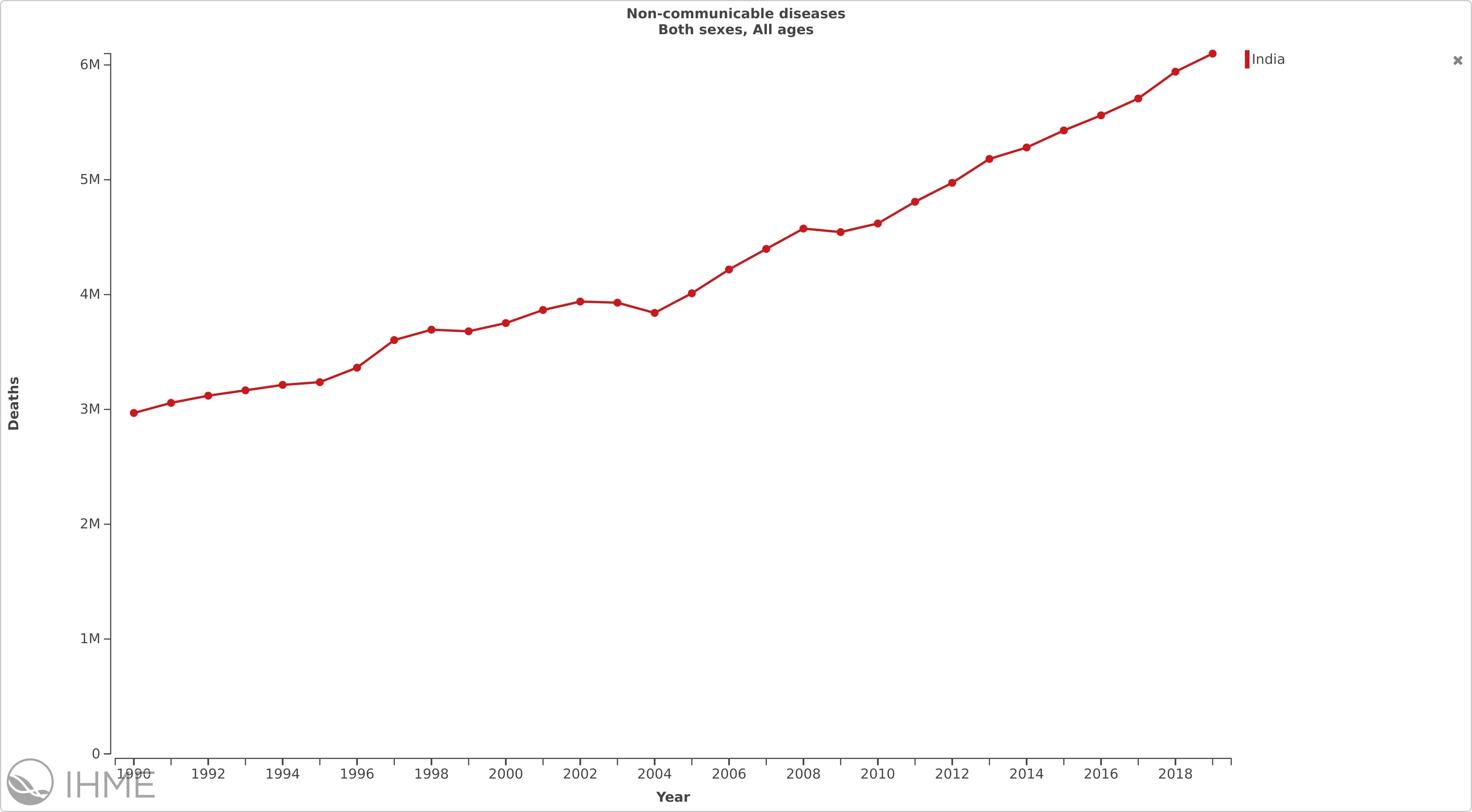
NCD mortality numbers from 1990 to 2019 in India

The burden of the Non-Communicable Diseases (NCD) in India with a population of the over 1.3 billion is huge. NCDs in India contributed to 6.8 million deaths in 2019, which is about 67.6% percent of overall deaths. In the same year Ischemic heart disease accounted for highest mortality followed by COPD, Stroke and Diabetes among all NCD related deaths.

Starting in early 1990s, there have been wide disparities in terms of NCD burden on Indian diaspora. While life expectancy has increased it is the number of years lost due to ill-health, disability or early death (DALY) rate that is almost doubled. It was 29.17% in 1990 and reached 57.92% in 2019 according to IHME. Also NCDs are accounting for more than 90% of total prevalent cases in India at any given point of time. Between ages 15–49 NCDs mortality share was 35.56% in 1990 while the share is increased to 48.95% in 2019

==== A 2021 report on NCD status in India ====
Through Arbitrage Research Institute (TARI) a private not for profit market research firm has developed a report for ASSOCHAM regarding NCD status in India. This study highlighted the burden of NCDs among Indians and has highlighted that the prevalence of having any NCDs among the Indian population is 116 per 1000 population.

===== Key findings =====
- High blood pressure, intestinal disorders related to digestion, diabetes, respiratory disorders, neurological disorders, cardiovascular diseases, renal disorders, and cancers are top NCDs among Indians
- Major risk factors for NCDs include air pollution (76%), low physical activity (67%), imbalanced diet (55%), stress (44%) and obesity (24%)
- Among states Odisha has the highest prevalence of NCDs, with every 272 per 1,000 population with any NCD and Gujarat has the lowest prevalence — 60 per 1,000.
- More than two-thirds of people with non-communicable disease (NCDs) in India are in the 26-59 age group
- Prevalence of NCD has shown to be increasing after 18 years and makes a quantum leap when an individual crosses the age of 35
- Diabetes and hypertension showed higher prevalence in those who are 50 years and above while brain/neurological disorders showed higher prevalence in the age group 35 years and below

In 2018 chronic obstructive pulmonary disease was the leading cause of death after heart disease. The 10 most polluted cities in the world are all in northern India with more than 140 million people breathing air 10 times or more over the WHO safe limit. In 2017, pollution levels forced schools to close for several days and air pollution killed 1.24 million Indians.

A statewide STEPS survey done in Madhya Pradesh estimated 22.3 percent had hypertension and 6.8 percent had diabetes.

=== High infant mortality rate ===
Despite health improvements over the last thirty years, lives continue to be lost to early childhood diseases, inadequate newborn care and childbirth-related causes. More than two million children die every year from preventable infections.

Approximately 1.72 million children die each year before turning one. The under five mortality and infant mortality rates have been declining, from 202 and 190 deaths per thousand live births respectively in 1970 to 64 and 50 deaths per thousand live births respectively in 2009 and to 41.1 (in 2018) and 34.6 (in 2016) deaths per thousand live births respectively. However, this decline is slowing. Reduced funding for immunization leaves only 43.5% of the young fully immunized. A study conducted by the Future Health Systems Consortium in Murshidabad, West Bengal indicates that barriers to immunization coverage are adverse geographic location, absent or inadequately trained health workers and low perceived need for immunization. Infrastructure like hospitals, roads, water and sanitation are lacking in rural areas. Shortages of healthcare providers, poor intrapartum and newborn care, diarrheal diseases and acute respiratory infections also contribute to the high infant mortality rate.

=== Sanitation ===
In 2008 there were more than 122 million households that had no toilets, and 33% lacked access to toilets, over 50% of the population (638 million) defecated in the open. This was relatively higher than Bangladesh and Brazil (7%) and China (4%). 211 million people gained access to improved sanitation from 1990 to 2008. A huge portion of Indian Population lacked access to toilets prior to the 2014, and open defecation on roads and railway tracks were very common. However, due to the success of "Swacch Bharat Mission" initiative of the government of India, launched in 2014, India constructed 110 million toilets in the country on the cost of $28 billion. As of 2018 about 95.76% of Indian households have toilet access and in 2019 the Government of India declared the country "Open Defecation Free" (ODF).

Several million more have multiple episodes of diarrhea and still others fall ill on account of Hepatitis A, enteric fever, intestinal worms and eye and skin infections caused by poor hygiene and unsafe drinking water.

Access to protected sources of drinking water improved from 68% of the population in 1990 to 88% in 2008. However, only 26% of the slum population has access to safe drinking water, and 25% of the total population has drinking water on their premises. This problem is exacerbated by falling levels of groundwater caused mainly by increasing extraction for irrigation. Insufficient maintenance of the environment around water sources, groundwater pollution, excessive arsenic and fluoride in drinking water pose a major threat to India's health.

=== Female health issues ===
A major issue for women in India is that few have access to skilled birth attendants and fewer still to quality emergency obstetric care. In addition, only 15 per cent of mothers receive complete antenatal care and only 58 per cent receive iron or folate tablets or syrup. Women's health in India involves numerous issues. Some of them include the following:

- Malnutrition : The main cause of female malnutrition in India is the tradition requiring women to eat last, even during pregnancy and when they are lactating.
- Breast cancer : One of the most severe and increasing problems among women in India, resulting in higher mortality rates.
- Maternal mortality : Indian maternal mortality rates in rural areas are one of the highest in the world.

=== Rural health ===
Rural India contains over 68% of India's total population, and half of all residents of rural areas live below the poverty line, struggling for better and easy access to health care and services. Health issues confronted by rural people are many and diverse – from severe malaria to uncontrolled diabetes, from a badly infected wound to cancer. Postpartum maternal illness is a serious problem in resource-poor settings and contributes to maternal mortality, particularly in rural India. A study conducted in 2009 found that 43.9% of mothers reported they experienced postpartum illnesses six weeks after delivery. Furthermore, because of limited government resources, much of the health care provided comes from non profits such as The MINDS Foundation.

=== Urban health ===
==== Rapid urbanization and disparities in urban India ====
India's urban population has increased from 285 million in 2001 to 377 million (31%) in 2011. It is expected to increase to 535 million (38%) by 2026 (4). The United Nations estimates that 875 million people will live in Indian cities and towns by 2050. If urban India were a separate country, it would be the world's fourth largest country after China, India and the United States of America. According to data from Census 2011, close to 50% of urban dwellers in India live in towns and cities with a population of less than 0.5 million. The four largest urban agglomerations Greater Mumbai, Kolkata, Delhi and Chennai are home to 15% of India's urban population.

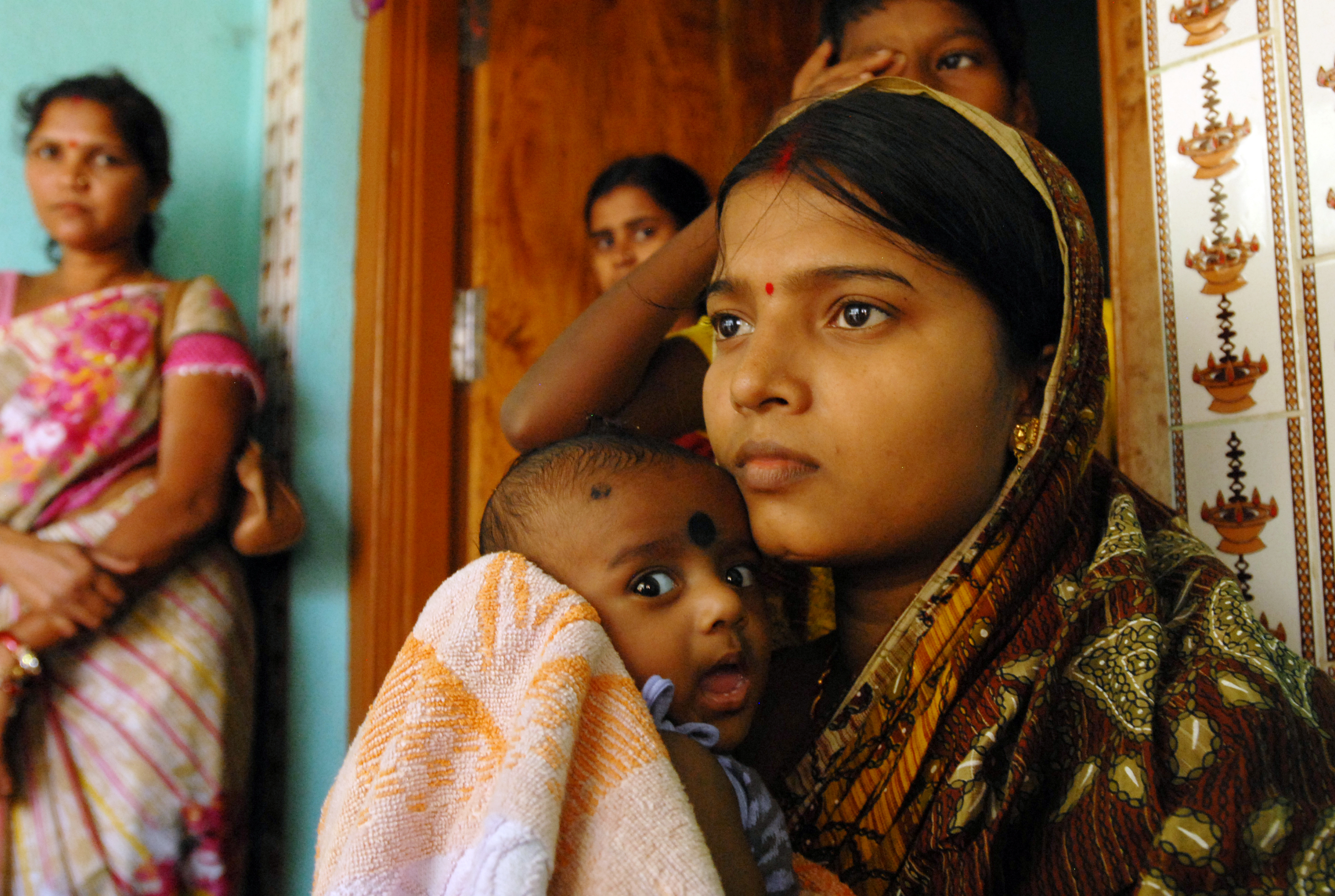
A woman and her baby boy are healthy and safe post delivery, after receiving access to healthcare services through an assistance program in Orissa, India.

==== Child health and survival disparities in urban India ====
Analysis of National Family Health Survey Data for 2005–06 (the most recent available dataset for analysis) shows that within India's urban population – the under-five mortality rate for the poorest quartile eight states, the highest under-five mortality rate in the poorest quartile occurred in UttarPradesh (110 per 1,000 live births), India's most populous state, which had 44.4 million urban dwellers in the 2011 census followed by Rajasthan (102), Madhya Pradesh (98), Jharkhand (90) and Bihar (85), Delhi (74), and Maharashtra (50). The sample for West Bengal was too small for analysis of under-five mortality rate. In Uttar Pradesh was four times that of the rest of the urban populations in Maharashtra and Madhya Pradesh. In Madhya Pradesh, the under-five mortality rate among its poorest quartile was more than three times that of the rest of its urban population.

==== Maternal healthcare disparities in urban India ====
Among India's urban population there is a much lower proportion of mothers receiving maternity care among the poorest quartile; only 54 per cent of pregnant women had at least three ante-natal care visits compared to 83 per cent for the rest of the urban population. Less than a quarter of mothers within the poorest quartile received adequate maternity care in Bihar (12 percent), and Uttar Pradesh (20 percent), and less than half in Madhya Pradesh (38 percent), Delhi (41 percent), Rajasthan (42 percent), and Jharkhand (48 percent). Availing three or more ante-natal check-ups during pregnancy among the poorest quartile was better in West Bengal (71 percent), Maharashtra (73 percent).

==== High levels of undernutrition among the urban poor ====
For India's urban population in 2005–06, 54 percent of children were stunted, and 47 percent underweight in the poorest urban quartile, compared to 33 percent and 26 percent, respectively, for the rest of the urban population. Stunted growth in children under five years of age was particularly high among the poorest quartile of the urban populations in Uttar Pradesh (64 percent), Maharashtra (63 percent), Bihar (58 percent), Delhi(58 percent), Madhya Pradesh (55 percent), Rajasthan (53 percent), and slightly better in Jharkhand (49 percent). Even in the better-performing states close to half of the children under-five were stunted among the poorest quartile, being 48 percent in West Bengal respectively.

High levels of stunted growth and underweight issues among the urban poor in India points to repeated infections, depleting the child's nutritional reserves, owing to sub-optimal physical environment. It is also indicative of high levels of food insecurity among this segment of the population. A study carried out in the slums of Delhi showed that 51% of slum families were food insecure.

== Initiatives ==
=== Health education programs ===
The Indian government has implemented several initiatives over the past few decades to boost healthcare opportunities and access in both rural areas and urban slums. International researchers and organizations have cited the need to implement more long-term solutions to permanently improve slum health; they argue that government-funded programs like the National Rural Health Mission (NRHM) or the National Urban Health Mission (NUHM) have a short-lived impact. The National Immunization Programme, a notable example, prioritized providing vaccinations to slum-dwellers to reduce spread of infectious disease, but research suggests that the efficacy of this program was limited because slum residents remain unaware of the significance of being immunized. This finding demonstrated the need to implement health education programs to work towards long-term solutions to the slum health crisis. Non-profit organizations have approached this problem in a multitude of different ways.

While some organizations continue to provide service through opening medical facilities in inner city areas or advocating for infrastructural change (e.g. improving water sanitation), other newer organizations are increasingly focusing on educating the population on health care resources through community-based health education programs. Factors like fear of consequence, gender, individual agency, and overall socioeconomic environment have an effect on the ability and willingness of patients to seek healthcare resources. Implementing health awareness programs and focusing on improving the population's knowledge of healthcare resources has a significant effect on their ability to access affordable care, prevent illness, and prevent job loss. For example, in parts of India, public facilities offer free treatment for tuberculosis, yet many slum residents choose to visit expensive private healthcare facilities due to lack of awareness of this program. After an initiative involving conversations between health experts and slum households, a significant number of residents turned to public facilities rather than private hospitals to receive effective treatment at no cost.

Organizations have implemented a similar method of health education within urban schools to combat nutritional deficiency and malnutrition among children. Through use of informational videos and posters and curriculum changes, all implemented within a school setting, adolescents had an increased awareness of their nutritional needs and the resources they could utilize. Overall, health education programs have proven to be an effective strategy in addressing the root causes of health disparities and promoting long-term change in underserved communities.

Preventive and Promotive Healthcare

- Mission Indradhanush

Programmes for Communicable Diseases

- National Viral Hepatitis Control Program
- Integrated Disease Surveillance Programme
- National TB Elimination Programme (formerly Revised National Tuberculosis Control Programme)
- National Leprosy Eradication Programme
- National Vector Borne Disease Control Programme
- National AIDS Control Programme
- Pulse Polio Programme

Programmes Non-communicable Diseases

NON COMMUNICABLE DISEASE CONTROL PROGRAMMES LAUNCHED BY MINISTRY OF HEALTH
Program	Launch Year
NATIONAL PROGRAM FOR CONTROL OF BLINDNESS AND VISUAL IMPAIRMENT (NPCBVI)	1976
NATIONAL MENTAL HEALTH PROGRAM (NMHP)	1982
NATIONAL PROGRAM FOR THE PREVENTION AND CONTROL OF DEAFNESS (NPPCD)	2007
NATIONAL TOBACCO CONTROL PROGRAM (NTCP)	2007
NATIONAL PROGRAM FOR HEALTHCARE OF ELDERLY (NPHCE)	2010
NATIONAL PROGRAMME FOR PREVENTION & CONTROL OF CANCER, DIABETES, CARDIOVASCULAR DISEASES & STROKE (NPCDCS)	2010
NATIONAL PROGRAM FOR PREVENTION AND MANAGEMENT OF BURN INJURIES (NPPMBI)	2010 (Initial pilot program)
NATIONAL PROGRAM FOR PALLIATIVE CARE (NPPC)	2012
NATIONAL ORAL HEALTH PROGRAM (NOHP)	2014

National Nutritional Programmes

- Integrated Child Development Services
- National Iodine Deficiency Disorders Control Programme
- Mid-Day Meal Programme

Programmes Related to System Strengthening / Welfare

- Ayushman Bharat Yojana
- National Program of Health Care for the Elderly
- Reproductive, Maternal, Newborn, Child and Adolescent Health
- National Rural Health Mission
- National Urban Health Mission

Miscellaneous

- Voluntary Blood Donation Programme
- Universal Immunization Programme
- Pradhan Mantri Swasthya Suraksha Yojana
- Janani Shishu Suraksha Yojana
- Rashtriya Kishor Swasthya Karyakram

== Other issues ==
According to Huffington Post, doctors spoke about the problems with "corporate hospitals" and senior surgeons being told to sell surgeries to their patients even if they weren't needed. In one instance, a doctor was told he would be sacked if he didn't have enough patients to operate on. The majority of India's private, for-profit hospitals charge exorbitant costs for medical services and supplies, which has put a strain on the country's public finances.

== See also ==
- Environment of India
- HIV/AIDS in India
- Indian states ranking by institutional delivery
- National Centre for Disease Control
- Poverty in India
- Healthcare in India
- Timeline of healthcare in India
- Tobacco control law in India
- Mental health in India
- National Commission for Indian System of Medicine
