= Indian Heart Association =

- Founder: Dr. Sevith Rao, Dr. Sishir Rao
- Type: Cardiac health organization
- Purpose: Cardiovascular and stroke prevention
- Location: Hyderabad, India
- Region served: India, and South Asians abroad
- Method: Medical clinics, preventative outreach, electronic media
- Website: www.indianheartassociation.org

The Indian Heart Association (IHA), along with the Indian Stroke Association (ISA), is an organization dedicated to raising cardiovascular and stroke health awareness among the South Asian population. The organisation was founded by Harvard Medical School and Berkeley-UCSF affiliates Dr. Sevith Rao and Dr. Sishir Rao. The organization has sponsored and conducted cardiac health camps in India to raise awareness about cardiovascular disease and is headquartered in Jubilee Hills, Hyderabad, India.

The organization was appointed to the Thoracic and Cardiovascular Surgery Instruments Sectional Committee for the Bureau of Indian Standards, Ministry of Health in 2013. The organization was featured in articles in prominent newspapers such as The Hindu and Eenadu as well as the front page of the Rice University webpage. In 2019, the organization was appointed to the Board of Directors for the Asia Pacific Heart Association, the leading interdisciplinary cardiovascular association in the Asia Pacific Region.

The IHA was featured in a 2018 The Economist case study on the heart disease epidemic in South Asia. The IHA also operates an affiliated organization, the Indian Stroke Association, focused on raising awareness about stroke.

== Overview ==
Public health estimates indicate that India accounts will account for approximately 60% of the world's heart disease burden, despite having less than 20% of the world's population. Heart disease is the number one cause of mortality and a silent epidemic among South Asians. In addition, South Asians are at high risk for stroke, accounting for 40% of global stroke deaths. The Indian Heart Association was founded to focus on the goals of primary and secondary prevention of cardiovascular disease and stroke.

== Recognition ==
The Indian Heart Association has been invited to numerous global cardiac health organization summits including the World Heart Federation Annual Meeting and The Economist Heart Health in Asia meetings. The IHA has also been recognised as a full member of the Cardiac subcommittee for the Bureau of Indian Standards in the Ministry of Health in India. The organization has prominent supporters and advisers including National Medal of Science Laureate Dr. C.R. Rao and former Science Advisor to the President of the United States Dr. Neal Francis Lane. Late Former President of India Dr. A. P. J. Abdul Kalam was an advisor for the Indian Heart Association.

== Partnerships ==
To date, the organization has partnered with prominent physicians including Cardiologists and Surgeons from Apollo Hospitals, KIMS, and Vishnu Hospital. The IHA has conducted or sponsored cardiac screening camps in Andhra Pradesh, Maharashtra, Telangana, and Tamil Nadu and has sponsored or advised other events throughout India. The organisation has also joined hands with the Indian Medical Student Association (IMSA), the largest medical student representative body in the country. In 2015, the IHA has partnered with the Child Heart Foundation, a non-profit in Delhi, India to raise funds for treatment of congenital heart disease for families with financial hardship. In 2018, the IHA partnered with Syybol, the world's largest Bollywood dance workout community.

== See also ==
- American Heart Association
- Cardiovascular disease
- Stroke
- Heart disease in India
