= Phlebotomus argentipes =

Scientific classification
- Kingdom: Animalia
- Phylum: Arthropoda
- Clade: Pancrustacea
- Class: Insecta
- Order: Diptera
- Family: Psychodidae
- Genus: Phlebotomus
- Species: P. argentipes

Binomial name
- Phlebotomus argentipes Annandale & Brunetti, 1908

Synonyms
- Phlebotomus glaucus Mitra & Roy, 1953; Phlebotomus annandalei Sinton, 1923; Phlebotomus zeylanicus Annandale, 1910; Phlebotomus marginatus Annandale, 1910

Species of fly

Phlebotomus argentipes are a species of sandfly in genus Phlebotomus in the Indian subcontinent They are notable as a vector for Leishmania donovani, the parasite which causes leishmaniasis.

== Life ==
The insect was first described by Nelson Annandale & Enrico Adelelmo Brunetti in 1908.

== Insecticide for bite prevention ==
There are recorded procedures for testing poison on this insect.

A 2018 study found the insect could be killed with common insecticides including cypermethrin, deltamethrin, lambda-cyhalothrin, permethrin, malathion and bendiocarb. The same study cautioned to rotate the use of pesticides to prevent the development of pesticide resistance.

A small study in Bihar found that by taking environmental measurements, it was possible to predict where this insect would live.

After taking environmental measurements, it is useful to recommend the regions where indoor residual spraying can effectively prevent insect bites.
