= David Molyneux =

British parasitologist (born 1943)

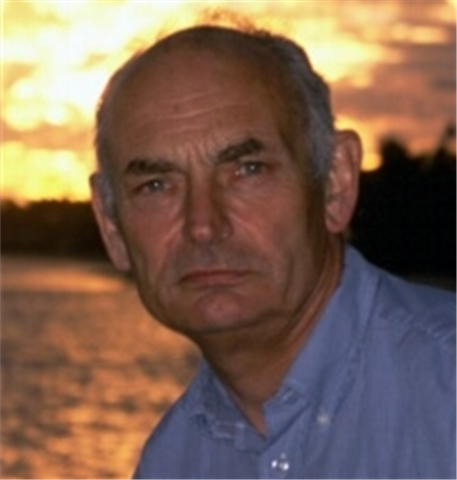
David Molyneux in 2010

David Hurst Molyneux CMG (born 1943) is a British parasitologist who served as the director of the Liverpool School of Tropical Medicine (1991–2000), where, as of 2018, he is an emeritus professor. He previously held the Chair of Biological Sciences at the University of Salford (1977–91), where he also served as Dean of the Faculty of Science. His research and advocacy have focused on what are now known as neglected tropical diseases, and Michael Barrett credits him (with Alan Fenwick and Peter Hotez) as among the earliest advocates of the campaign to focus international attention on this group of diseases in the early-to-mid 2000s.

== Biography ==
Molyneux was born in Northwich in Cheshire in 1943, and educated at Denstone College, Staffordshire (1956–62). He attended Emmanuel College of the University of Cambridge, gaining a degree in zoology (1965) and a PhD in parasitology (1969). He received a DSc from the University of Salford (1992).

His earliest position was as a lecturer in parasitology at the Liverpool School of Tropical Medicine (LSTM; 1968–75), interrupted by a stint at the Nigerian Institute of Trypanosomiasis Research (1970–72); his research focus was Leishmania. In 1975, he joined the World Health Organization (WHO), working on African trypanosomiasis in Burkina Faso (then Upper Volta). In 1977, he was appointed the Chair of Biological Sciences at the University of Salford, and subsequently Dean of the university's Faculty of Science; his research focus was onchocerciasis. In 1991, he returned to the LSTM as its director, a position he held until 2000. His work there focused on filariasis. In 1997, he established what later became the WHO Global Alliance for the Elimination of Filariasis, then funded by the Department for International Development and GlaxoSmithKline, who provided the antiparasitic albendazole. He served as the Alliance's executive secretary (2006–10) and directed the Lymphatic Filariasis Support Centre at LSTM (2000–08). He also held a professorship in tropical health sciences at the University of Liverpool. He performed various part-time roles at LSTM until September 2018, when he retired from the institute.

He has been the editor-in-chief of the Royal Society of Tropical Medicine and Hygiene's journal, International Health, since 2018. In 2010, he edited a series of articles on neglected tropical diseases for The Lancet.

Molyneux is married to Anita; they have two children. As of 2020, he lives in Kingsley in Cheshire.

== Awards and honours ==
Molyneux served as president of the British Society for Parasitology (BSP; 1992–94) and of the Royal Society of Tropical Medicine and Hygiene (RSTMH; 2007–09).

His awards include the Chalmers Medal (1987), the BSP's C. A. Wright Memorial Medal (1989), the Donald Mackay Medal (2007) and the Sir Patrick Manson Medal, the RSTMH's highest award (2013). He is an elected fellow of the Institute of Biology (1984), an honorary fellow of the Royal College of Physicians and of Liverpool John Moores University (2010), and has received honorary degrees from Georgetown University, Washington, D.C. (2010) and the University of Health and Allied Sciences, Ghana (2019). In the New Year Honours of 2020, he was awarded the Companion of the Order of St Michael and St George (CMG) for "services to Controlling Neglected Tropical Diseases".

== Selected publications ==
- Peter J. Hotez; Alan Fenwick; Lorenzo Savioli; David H. Molyneux (2009), "Rescuing the bottom billion through control of neglected tropical diseases", The Lancet, 373 (9674): 1570–1575, doi:10.1016/S0140-6736(09)60233-6, PMID 19410718, S2CID 18371227
- Peter J. Hotez; David H. Molyneux; Alan Fenwick; Jacob Kumaresan; Sonia Ehrlich Sachs; Jeffrey D. Sachs; Lorenzo Savioli (2007), "Control of Neglected Tropical Diseases", New England Journal of Medicine, 357 (10): 1018–27, doi:10.1056/NEJMra064142, PMID 17804846
- Peter J. Hotez; David H. Molyneux; Alan Fenwick; Eric Ottesen; Sonia Ehrlich Sachs; Jeffrey D. Sachs (2006), "Incorporating a Rapid-Impact Package for Neglected Tropical Diseases with Programs for HIV/AIDS, Tuberculosis, and Malaria: A comprehensive pro-poor health policy and strategy for the developing world", PLOS Medicine, 3 (5): e102, doi:10.1371/journal.pmed.0030102, PMC 1351920, PMID 16435908
- David H. Molyneux; Peter J. Hotez; Alan Fenwick (2005), ""Rapid-Impact Interventions": How a Policy of Integrated Control for Africa's Neglected Tropical Diseases Could Benefit the Poor", PLOS Medicine, 2 (11): e336, doi:10.1371/journal.pmed.0020336, PMC 1253619, PMID 16212468
