= Chalmers Award =

Chalmers Award may refer to:

- An early version of the Major League Baseball Most Valuable Player Award, presented from 1911 to 1914
- a series of Canadian arts awards funded by the Chalmers family of arts patrons, including:
  - The Floyd S. Chalmers Canadian Play Award
  - The M. Joan Chalmers Awards for Arts Administration, Artistic Direction and Documentary Film and Video
- Chalmers Medal awarded by the Royal Society of Tropical Medicine and Hygiene
