= Malcolm Molyneux =

Malaria researcher

Malcolm Molyneux OBE
- Born: November 20, 1943
- Died: November 16, 2021 (aged 77); Liverpool, England
- Known for: Malaria research; Co-creator of the Blantyre coma scale
- Spouse: Elizabeth Molyneux (m. 1969)
- Children: 4

Malcolm Edward Molyneux (20 November 1943 - 16 November 2021) was a British professor tropical medical researcher who specialised in malaria, especially cerebral malaria. He spent much of his career in Malawi, and was partially responsible for the establishment of the University of Malawi College of Medicine. He and other researchers developed the Blantyre coma scale, a scale to assess the severity of comas induced by malaria in children. For his work in the field, he was elected a fellow of the Academy of Medical Sciences in 1998 and appointed an OBE in 2006.

During his career he worked at the Queen Elizabeth Central Hospital in Blantyre, Malawi, and the Liverpool School of Tropical Medicine in Liverpool, England, where he was given the title of Emeritus Professor of Tropical Medicine. He also worked as an editor for Malawi Medical Journal and Tropical Doctor.

== Education ==
Malcom Molyneux earnt degrees in natural science and medicine from the University of Cambridge, and graduated in 1967. He then attended Barts and The London School of Medicine and Dentistry for his medical training. He subsequently completed a PhD on the viruses and liver disease in Malawi.

In 2019, he was given an honorary doctorate of science by the Liverpool School of Tropical Medicine.

== Career ==
After graduating, Molyneux moved to Malawi and in 1974 and began work as a doctor in St Luke's Hospital, Malosa. After a year, he transferred and started to work as a consultant at the Queen Elizabeth Central Hospital in Blantyre. He became a fellow of the Royal Society of Tropical Medicine and Hygiene in 1976. Molyneux left Malawi in 1984 and moved back to England after being invited by Herbert Michael Gilles to work as a lecturer at Liverpool School of Tropical Medicine. There he worked research on malaria, especially cerebral malaria in children, and helped to establish a research ward connected to the Queen Elizabeth Central Hospital's paediatric department in 1990. He and fellow researchers Terrie Taylor and Jack Wirima developed the Blantyre coma scale, a scale to assess the severity of comas induced by malaria in children.

In 1991, Molyneaux was invited to help set up the University of Malawi College of Medicine, whose creation he had recommended, alongside Hetherwick Ntaba and Peter Chimimba, in 1985. In 1995, he moved back to Malawi and began work as the director of the newly-established Malawi-Liverpool Wellcome Trust. In 1998 he was elected as a fellow of the Academy of Medical Sciences. In 2006, he was awarded an OBE for his work in Malawi healthcare. He retired the next year and was given the title of Emeritus Professor of Tropical Medicine at the Liverpool School of Tropical Medicine.

Apart from his work in research medicine, Molyneaux also founded Medical Quarterly, later the Malawi Medical Journal, in 1976, and worked there as an editor chief of the from 1980 to 1984, and as editor of the Tropical Doctor from 1985 to 1992. He worked for The Lancet as an ombudsman, and took part on World Health Organization committees and the Malaria Control Programme in Malawi. Additionally, he was the chairman of a committee overseeing the safety of the then-untested malaria vaccine RTS,S. In 1995, he wrote chapters on malaria, fevers, amoebiasis, giardiasis, balantidiasis, anaemia, and flukes for the fourth edition of Lecture Notes on Tropical Medicine. For the fifth edition, he wrote the chapter "Malaria".

In 2009, he was awarded the Sir Rickard Christophers Medal.

== Personal life ==
Malcolm Edward Molyneux was born on 20 November 1943 in the Belgian Congo to missionaries Colin and Joyce (née Gammon) Molyneux. As a child he attended the Sakeji School, a boarding school in what was then Northern Rhodesia, but at the age of 13 went to board at Eltham College in London. While studying at Barts, Molyneaux met his future wife, Elizabeth Neech. They married in 1969 and, by 1974, had two children.

Molyneux was diagnosed with chronic lymphocytic leukaemia in the 1990s and with aggressive lymphoma in 2013. He moved back to Liverpool in 2015, where he died on 16 November 2021 at the age of 77. At the time of his death he had four children and 11 grandchildren.

== Publications ==
=== Books ===
- Bell, Dion R. (ed.). Lecture Notes on Tropical Medicine (4th ed.). Blackwell Scientific.
- Beeching, Nick; Gill, Geoff, eds. (2004). "Malaria". Lecture Notes on Tropical Medicine (5th ed.). Blackwell Scientific.

=== Papers ===
- Molyneux, Malcolm; Taylor, Terrie; Wirima, J.J.; Borgsteinj, A. (May 1989). "Clinical Features and Prognostic Indicators in Paediatric Cerebral Malaria: A Study of 131 Comatose Malawian Children". QJM: An International Journal of Medicine. 71 (2): 441–459. doi:10.1093/oxfordjournals.qjmed.a068338. ISSN 1460-2393.
- Molyneux, M.E.; Engelmann, H.; Taylor, Terrie E.; Wirima, Jack J.; Aderka, Dan; Wallach, David; Grau, Georges E. (November 1993). "Circulating plasma receptors for tumour necrosis factor in Malawian children with severe falciparum malaria". Cytokine. 5 (6): 604–609. doi:10.1016/S1043-4666(05)80011-0. PMID 8186373.

== Awards and honours ==
- 1998: Fellow of the Academy of Medical Sciences
- 2006: Order of the British Empire
- 2009: Sir Rickard Christophers Medal
