= Joy Lawn =

British pediatrician

Joy Lawn FRCPCH FMedSci
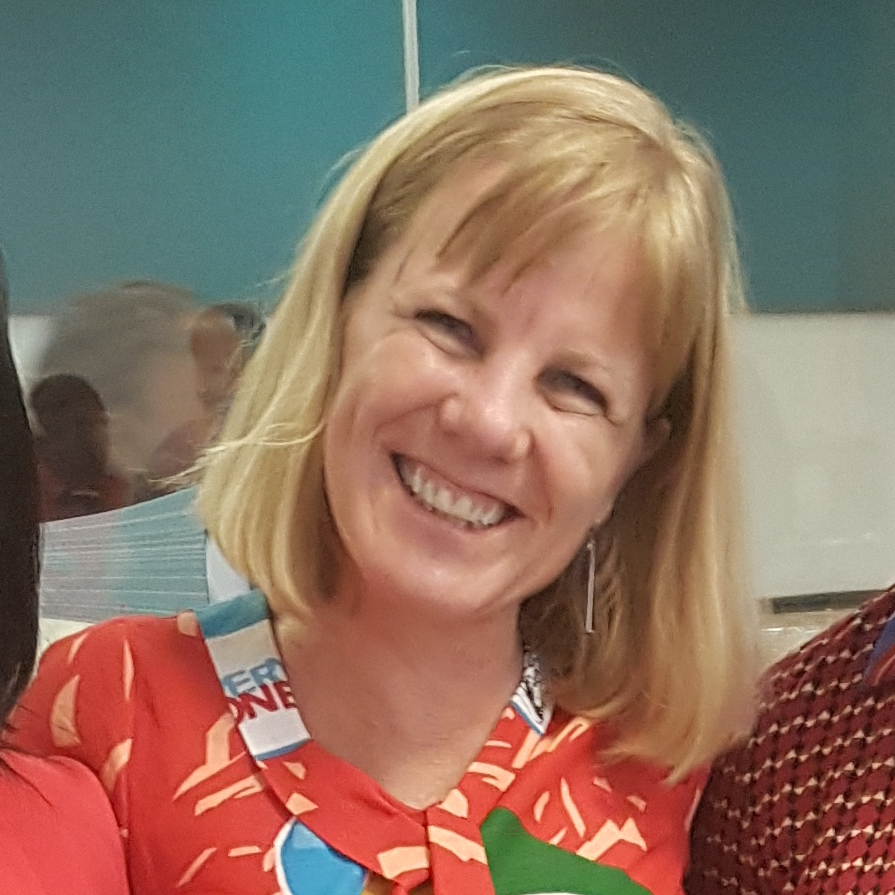
- Education: University of Nottingham (MB BS); Emory University (MPH); University College London (PhD)
- Known for: Neonatal deaths, stillbirths, perinatal epidemiology, public health, women's leadership
- Spouse: Stephen Lawn
- Awards: Royal Society Wolfson Research Merit Award
- Scientific career
- Workplaces: London School of Hygiene and Tropical Medicine; Save the Children USA
- Thesis: 4 million neonatal deaths : an analysis of available cause-of-death data and systematic country estimates with a focus on birth asphyxia (2009)
- Doctoral advisor: Anthony Costello
- Website: www.lshtm.ac.uk/aboutus/people/lawn.joy

Joy Elizabeth Lawn is a British paediatrician and professor of maternal, reproductive and child health. She is Director of the London School of Hygiene & Tropical Medicine Maternal, Adolescent, Reproductive & Child Health (MARCH) Centre. She developed the epidemiological evidence for the worldwide policy and programming that looks to reduce neonatal deaths and stillbirths and works on large-scale implementation research.

== Education and early career ==
Lawn's mother was a teacher and missionary in northern Uganda who suffered from an obstructed labour and was transferred to a bush hospital where the medic had never performed a caesarean section before. Lawn and her parents moved to Northern Ireland at the height of The Troubles. She studied medicine at the University of Nottingham and specialised in paediatrics, graduating in 1990. She moved back to Africa in the early 1990s, working as a neonatologist and lecturer at Kumasi in Ghana. She helped set up neonatal care at the University of Ghana Teaching Hospital. She was upset by many neonatal deaths daily and worked to reduce mortality with simple approaches, such as detecting infections early and not rotating nurses off neonatal wards.

== Research ==
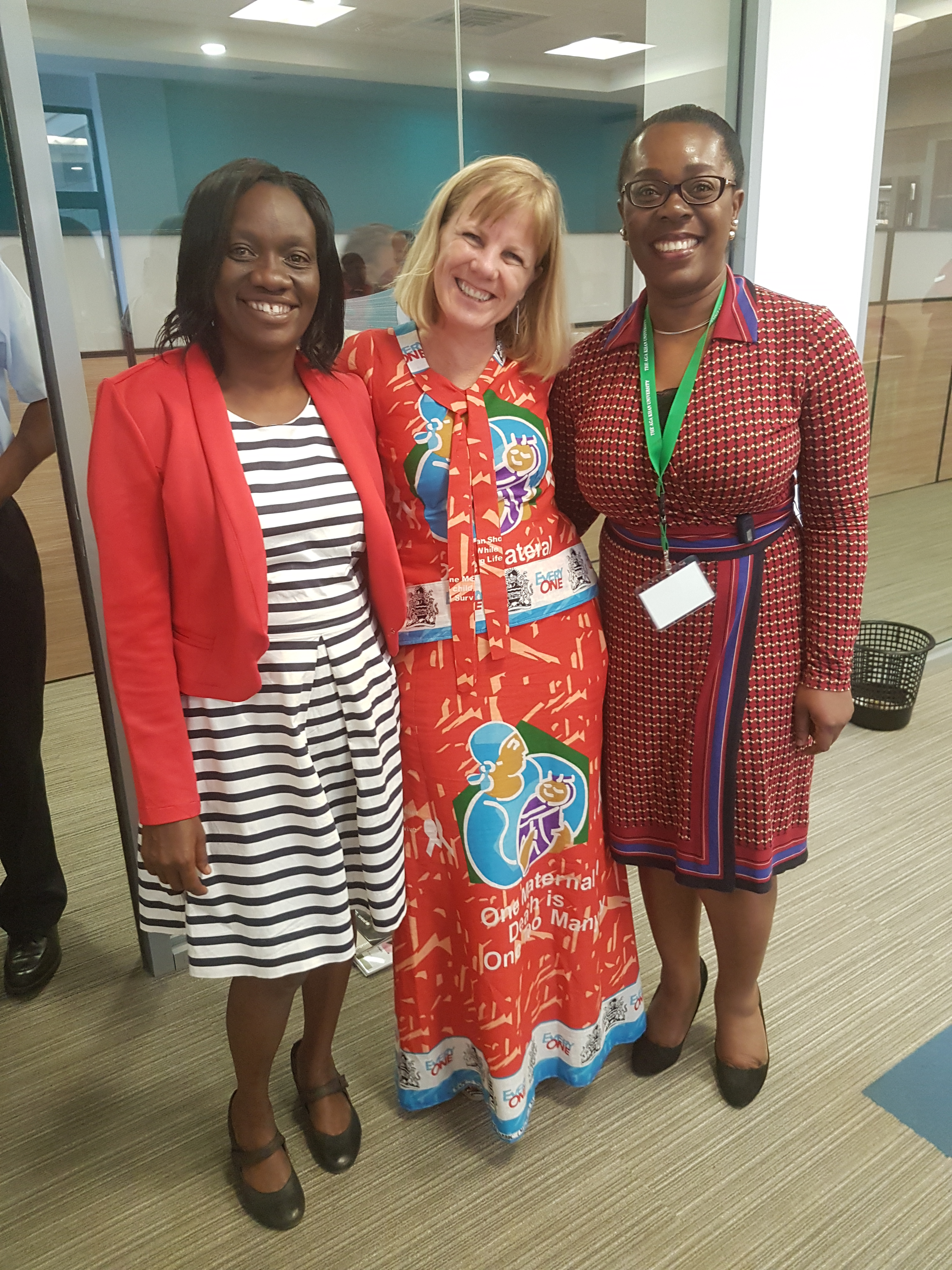
Victoria Nakibuuka, Lawn and Uduak Okomo

Lawn moved to Atlanta with her family in 1997. She became more interested in public health, and joined the Centers for Disease Control and Prevention. Whilst in Atlanta she earned a Master of Public Health at Emory University. She found there were very few statistics on infant mortality as many babies who die in the Developing World are not registered at birth. She moved to the UCL Great Ormond Street Institute of Child Health in 2001, where she completed a PhD in 2009. She worked for Save the Children USA from 2005. She was based in South Africa from 2005 to 2012 with Save the Children USA to work with 9 African countries to save newborn lives and undertaking large scale community trials. The BBC documentary, Invisible Lives, found that Nepal and Malawi were some of the few countries on track to meet the United Nations development goal to end the death of children under 5. In 2013 she was appointed director of MARCH at the LSHTM. She was awarded a Royal Society Wolfson Research Merit Award to improve data on stillbirths and newborns. With the London School of Hygiene & Tropical Medicine, Lawn developed a massive open online course on women's health that was delivered to over 26,000 participants from 130 countries.

=== Neonatal deaths and stillbirths ===
Lawn started to coordinate neonatal death and stillbirth estimates for the United Nations with the United Nations Child Health Epidemiology Reference Group from 2004. She developed the first cause of death estimates for neonatal deaths, which was published in The Lancet in 2005. She found in Uttar Pradesh neonatal mortality rates were as high as 60 in 1000 livebirths and 41 per 1000 in Sub-Saharan Africa. In her report she called for an end to the 'unconscionable' 450 newborn deaths per hour. She developed the continuum of care for reproductive, maternal, newborn and child health (RMNCH). She co-led The Lancet Stillbirth series in 2011 and 2016. She worked with the World Health Organization (WHO) to identify that in 2008 there were 2.65 million stillbirths worldwide, with 67% occurring in rural families. The report found that over 98% of the stillbirths worldwide were in middle and low-income families. Lawn presented a Lancet TV series on Ending the Stillbirth epidemic.

She was funded by the Bill & Melinda Gates Foundation as the Director of Evidence and Policy for Save the Children, Saving Newborn Lives Program. She was appointed to the Department for International Development Senior Research Fellow for newborn health in 2011 to 2015. She has worked to draw attention to equity issues and was involved with the Countdown to 2015 initiative. Lawn works on improving community engagement with national policy on healthcare, emphasising that in some countries people will choose to give birth at home even when there are nearby facilities, especially if quality of care is poor. Improving the quality of care at birth in hospitals could save 2 million lives a year Lawn's The Lancet Neonatal Survival Series (2005) was followed ten years later by the Every Newborn Series, which advocated for quality care, facilities and community action at birth. This series led to the UN's Every Newborn Action Plan, and the first ever Global Goal for every country to reduce newborn deaths

Preterm birth was made a World Health Organization priority to reach Millennium Development Goal 4. Lawn believes that kangaroo care could prevent death and disability caused by preterm birth and is an important foundation for intensive care that is family centred. In 2014 she studied preterm birth worldwide, which is now the number one killer of young children under five worldwide. She estimated that over one million children under 5 years old died from complications of pregnancy. These realisations motivated Lawn and Mary Kinney with the March of Dimes and 50 partner agencies to author the Born Too Soon Global Action Report on preterm birth, the first ever estimates of preterm birth by country. They found that 44% of child deaths globally occurred during the first month. The report was included as a commitment on the Every Woman Every Child website. Group B streptococcal infection is an important perinatal pathogen. Lawn works on Group B streptococcal infection, hoping to improve health system measurements and intervention trials. In estimates published with Anna Seale and 103 other authors, Group B Strep was found to be responsible for at least 150,000 preventable infant deaths and stillbirths a year.

== Awards and honours ==
Lawn was awarded the 2013 Programme for Global Paediatric Research award for Outstanding Contributions to Global Child Health. In 2014 the Uppsala University awarded her the Nils Rosén medal for paediatrics. in 2015 she was awarded the Sheth Distinguished International Alumni Award, Emory University, Atlanta. She was made a Fellow of the Academy of Medical Sciences in 2016. She was elected to the National Academy of Medicine in 2018.

== Personal life ==
Lawn is the widow of Stephen Lawn, who was a TB/HIV researcher at London School of Hygiene & Tropical Medicine and the University of Cape Town. Stephen died in 2016 of an aggressive brain tumour. They have two children.
