= Simon Hayes =

Simon Hayes may refer to:

- Simon Hayes (sound engineer)
- Simon Hayes (police commissioner), politician

== See also ==
- Simon Haynes, Australian writer
- Simon Haynes (priest)
- Simon Hay, British epidemiologist
