= Jeffrey Jon Shaw =

Jeffrey Shaw
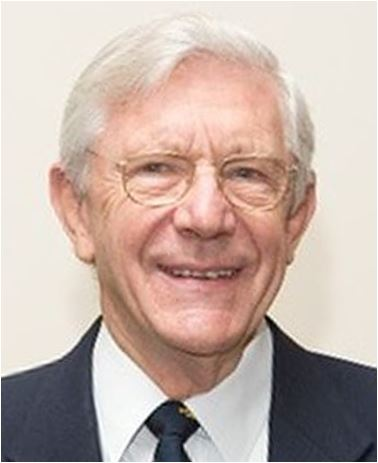
- Jeffrey Jon Shaw c. 2019
- Born: 12 July 1938; Kent, United Kingdom
- Citizenship: British
- Education: Dartford Technical School for Boys (now Wilmington Academy), Chislehurst and Sidcup Grammar School
- Alma mater: London University
- Occupation: parasitologist
- Employer: Universidade de São Paulo
- Awards: Chalmers Medal (1978); Officer of the British Empire (1999); Professor Samuel Barnsley Pessôa Award (2014); Fellow of the Brazilian Academy of Sciences (2015); Carlos Chagas Medal (2018)
- Website: http://lattes.cnpq.br/4665897914902853

Jeffrey Jon Shaw OBE, FLS, FASTMH (born 12 July 1938) is a British parasitologist who began working in Latin America in 1962. Although officially retired, he is presently a Senior Professor at São Paulo University's Biomedical Sciences Institute where he continues his research in its Parasitology Department.

== Life ==
During World War II he was evacuated and spent his early childhood in the village of Rothley, Leicestershire, whose surrounding countryside became his playground and fostered his love of nature. When the war ended, he returned to Kent, living there until he went to university in London. Since 1965 he has lived and worked in Brazil. Amongst his hobbies are a love of classical music and sailing. He continues to sail and participate in championships. There is a yearly Snipe class trophy in his name at the Brasília Yacht club.

== Career ==
He gained a BSc in Zoology in 1960 at London University's Queen Mary College (now Queen Mary University) of London and a PhD in 1964 at the London School of Hygiene and Tropical Medicine under the guidance of Percy Cyril Garnham and Cecil Hoare. The field work for his doctoral thesis on the life cycle of Endotrypaum was performed in Central America in 1962 with Wellcome Trust support.

He contracted cutaneous leishmaniasis there; this motivated his lifelong interest in the disease. In the early 1960s, he and his colleague Alister Voller pioneered the use of indirect immunofluorescent techniques for the diagnosis of visceral leishmaniasis and Chagas Disease. In 1977 he was awarded a DSc at the London School of Hygiene and Tropical Medicine. In 1965 he and Ralph Lainson moved to Belém, Brazil where they founded the Wellcome Parasitology Unit. In 1994 he became a tenured senior professor at the University of São Paulo (USP) and has continued there until the present time.

His research focuses on different aspects of neglected tropical diseases (NTDs), in particular the leishmaniases and Chagas disease. Within these areas he has worked on their taxonomy, diagnosis and epidemiology. Presently his research is focused on the application of molecular methods to these areas.

== Honours and awards ==
- 1973 awarded the Oswaldo Cruz Medal of Pará State's Cultural Council
- 1978 awarded the Chalmers Medal of the Royal Society of Tropical Medicine and Hygiene
- 1999 invested Officer of the British Empire (OBE)
- 2012 elected Honorary Member of the Brazilian Society of Parasitology
- 2013 laboratory Prof Dr Jeffrey Jon Shaw named in his honor by the Parasitology Department of the University of São Paulo.
- 2013 honored for his contributions to the field of leishmaniasis by the organizing committee of the 5th WorldLeish
- 2014 awarded the Professor Samuel Barnsley Pessôa Award of the Brazilian Society of Protozoology
- 2014 elected Honorary Member of the Brazilian Society of Protozoology
- 2016 honored for outstanding contribution to Leishmaniasis CHAGASLEISH meeting
- 2016 elected as a Fellow of the Brazilian Academy of Sciences
- 2017 elected Honorary International Fellow of the American Society of Tropical Medicine and Hygiene
- 2018 awarded the Carlos Chagas Scientific Merit Medal of the Brazilian Society of Tropical Medicine

== Selected works ==
- Shaw, Jeffrey Jon (1969). The Haemoflagellates of Sloths . H. K. Lewis & Co. Ltd.: London.
- Shaw, Jeffrey Jon (1985). The hemoflagellates of sloths vermilinguas (Anteaters), and armadillos . In: Montgomery, G. G. (ed.) The evolution and ecology of armadillos, sloths and vermilinguas. Washington: Smithsonian Institution Press, p. 279-292.
- Lainson, Ralph & Shaw, Jeffrey Jon (1987) Evolution, classification and geographical distribution. In: Peters, W. and Killick-Kendrick, R. The leishmaniases in biology and medicine, v. 1 - Biology and epidemiology. Academic Press: London, p. 1-120.
- Shaw, Jeffrey Jon (2002). New World Leishmaniasis: The Ecology of Leishmaniasis and the Diversity of Leishmanial Species in Central and South America. In: Farrell, J. P. Leishmania. Boston: Springer.
- Shaw, Jeffrey Jon (2002). An appraisal of the taxonomy and nomenclature of trypanosomatids presently classified as Leishmania and Endotrypanum. In: Farrell, J. P. Leishmania. Boston: Springer.
- Rangel, Elizabeth Ferreira & Shaw, Jeffrey Jon (eds.) (2018) Brazilian Sand Flies: Biology, Taxonomy, Medical Importance and Control. Springer International: New York.

== Notes ==
1.The Samuel Pessoa Award is the most prestigious award of the Brazilian Society of Protozoology and is awarded annually to a figure of great prominence in Protozoology. The Samuel Pessôa Prize is awarded during the Annual Meeting of the Society. The awardee automatically becomes an honorary member of the Brazilian Society of Protozoology.
2.The Carlos Chagas Scientific Merit Medal is the highest award of the Brazilian Society of Tropical Medicine, awarded annually since 2014 to a person who has had an exceptional scientific production in the area of Tropical Medicine while working in Brazil, who has played an important role in the training of human resources in Tropical Medicine (stricto sensu and lato sensu) and whose work has resulted in notable benefits to the academic community and the general population.
