= Owen Price =

Owen Price may refer to:

- Owen Price (footballer) (born 1986), English footballer
- Owen Price (writer), Welsh writer
