= Anthony Butterworth =

British immunologist

Anthony Butterworth (1945 - 2024) FRS was a British immunologist.

He worked for the Schistosomiasis Research Group at the University of Cambridge. His laboratory work was supplemented by field studies in sub-Saharan Africa, the Philippines, South America and the United States.

He was a former trustee of the international water and sanitation charity Pump Aid.

Professor Butterworth died on 2 March 2024.

== Honours and awards ==
- 1990: King Faisal International Prize for Medicine
- 1990: Chalmers Medal of the Royal Society of Tropical Medicine and Hygiene
- 1994: Elected a Fellow of the Royal Society
