= Hazel Dockrell =

Irish-born microbiologist and immunologist

Hazel Marguerite Dockrell (born 1952) is an Irish-born microbiologist and immunologist whose research has focused on immunity to the human mycobacterial diseases, leprosy and tuberculosis. She has spent most of her career at the London School of Hygiene and Tropical Medicine, where as of 2020 she is a professor of immunology. She was the first female president of the Royal Society of Tropical Medicine and Hygiene. Jimmy Whitworth of the Wellcome Trust describes her as "a marvellous ambassador for global health and research."

== Early life and education ==
Dockrell was born in Ireland in 1952 and brought up in Dublin. Her father held medical and dentistry qualifications. She was educated at Alexandra School and College, Dublin, and Trinity College Dublin, where she studied natural sciences, graduating in microbiology. She moved to London for her postgraduate education. Her PhD (1978) was from the Royal Dental Hospital of London (now part of St Thomas' Hospital), researching Sjögren syndrome, a human autoimmune disease; her supervisor was John Greenspan.

== Career and research ==
Her first post-doctoral position was at the immunology department of Middlesex Hospital Medical School (1978–85), working with John Playfair under Ivan Roitt. Her research there was on anti-malarial immune responses. In 1985, she joined the recently established department of clinical tropical medicine at the London School of Hygiene and Tropical Medicine (LSHTM), working with Keith McAdam. Her early research at LSHTM was on immunity to leprosy, particularly the T-cell response to Mycobacterium leprae. She spent time at the Aga Khan University in Karachi where she began a long-term collaboration with the Pakistani immunologist, Rabia Hussain. The clinical presentation of leprosy shows a range of possible symptoms, and Dockrell and Hussain have investigated the way in which the body's anti-mycobacterial immune response determines what form of disease occurs. They have also researched methods to diagnose the disease.

More recently, Dockrell has switched her research focus to tuberculosis, another mycobacterial disease, an area in which she has contributed significant advances. Her work has focused on the immune responses to the bacterium. She has studied the CD8^{+} T-cell response to mycobacteria, and characterised the profile of biomarkers such as cytokines both to natural infection and to vaccination with the BCG vaccine. In collaboration with the epidemiologist Paul Fine (Karonga Prevention Study, Malawi) and others, she has tried to elucidate why BCG vaccination generates different levels of protection when given in different contexts, such as African countries compared with the UK. She has studied the role in tuberculosis of concurrent infections with helminth parasites as well as non-infectious diseases such as diabetes. She has also promoted global collaborative research into new vaccines against the disease within the European Tuberculosis Vaccine Initiative.

As of 2020, Dockrell is a professor of immunology at LSHTM. In addition to her own research work, Dockrell was the deputy director of research at LSHTM and, as of 2020, advises its director Peter Piot on collaborative programmes with Africa. In the latter role, she has focused on improving the research capabilities of the multiple African institutes with which LSHTM collaborates. Dockrell was the first woman to serve as president of the Royal Society of Tropical Medicine and Hygiene (2009–11).

She has been one of the co-authors of Cedric Mims' textbook Medical Microbiology from the third edition (2003).

== Personal life ==
Her partner is Stephen Gaccon, whom she met while studying for her PhD.

== Selected publications ==
Books

- Richard Goering, Hazel Dockrell, Mark Zuckerman, Peter L. Chiodini. Mims' Medical Microbiology and Immunology (6th edition) (Elsevier; 2018) (ISBN 978-0702071546)

Research papers

- Black, Gillian F.; Weir, Rosemary E.; Floyd, Sian; Bliss, Lyn; Warndorff, David K.; Crampin, Amelia C.; Ngwira, Bagrey; Sichali, Lifted; Nazareth, Bernadette; Blackwell, Jenefer M.; Branson, Keith; Chaguluka, Steven D.; Donovan, Linda; Jarman, Elizabeth; King, Elizabeth; Fine, Paul EM; Dockrell, Hazel M. (2002), "BCG-induced increase in interferon-gamma response to mycobacterial antigens and efficacy of BCG vaccination in Malawi and the UK: Two randomised controlled studies", The Lancet, 359 (9315): 1393–1401, doi:10.1016/S0140-6736(02)08353-8, PMID 11978337, S2CID 24334622
- Lalvani, A.; Brookes, R.; Wilkinson, R. J.; Malin, A. S.; Pathan, A. A.; Andersen, P.; Dockrell, H.; Pasvol, G.; Hill, A. V. S. (1998), "Human cytolytic and interferon-secreting CD8+ T lymphocytes specific for Mycobacterium tuberculosis", Proceedings of the National Academy of Sciences, 95 (1): 270–75, doi:10.1073/pnas.95.1.270, PMC 18198, PMID 9419365
