= Philip D. Marsden =

Philip Davis Marsden (7 January 1933 – 4 October 1997) was a British-born professor who was known for his work on tropical medicine.

== Early life and education ==
Born in London in 1933, Marsden earned his medical degree from University College Hospital. He completed his thesis on pediatric health in Gambia, focusing on the challenges faced by children in that region.

== Career ==
Beginning his fieldwork in Brazil in 1967, Marsden was later appointed a professor of tropical medicine at the University of Brasília. He became recognised for his expertise in leishmaniasis, a disease transmitted by sand flies. Marsden was instrumental in establishing clinics in the Amazon region and published extensively, including chapters in medical textbooks used in the United Kingdom and the United States. He also trained many doctors in Latin America in the field of parasitology.

Marsden held academic positions at the London School of Hygiene and Tropical Medicine, Cornell Medical Center in Manhattan, and Makerere University in Uganda.

== Awards and recognition ==
Marsden was honoured with the Order of the British Empire and received the Chalmers Medal from the Royal Society of Tropical Medicine and Hygiene for his contributions to the field.
