= Judy Omumbo =

Kenyan epidemiologist

- Occupation: Epidemologist
- Awards: Fellow of the African Academy of Sciences (2012)

Academic background
- Education: University of Nairobi; Hebrew University of Jerusalem; Green College, Oxford
- Thesis: Developing a risk map of malaria transmission for East Africa (2005)
- Doctoral advisor: Simon I. Hay; David Rogers; Bob Snow

Academic work
- Discipline: Epidemiology
- Institutions: International Research Institute for Climate and Society; KEMRI/Wellcome Trust Malaria Public Health Department

Judith Atieno Omumbo is a Kenyan epidemiologist who studies the relationship between climate change and infectious diseases. A long-time worker at the KEMRI/Wellcome Trust Malaria Public Health Department, she is a 2012 Fellow of the African Academy of Sciences.

== Biography ==
Omumbo obtained her BDS at the University of Nairobi School of Medicine and her MPH at the Hebrew University of Jerusalem Braun School of Public Health and Community Medicine. She joined the KEMRI/Wellcome Trust Research Programme in 1995. She studied at Green College, Oxford on a Wellcome Trust scholarship, obtaining a PhD in epidemiology in 2005; her doctoral dissertation Developing a risk map of malaria transmission for East Africa was supervised by Simon I. Hay, David Rogers, and Bob Snow.

== International career ==
Omumbo worked at the International Research Institute for Climate and Society as an Africa programme associate researcher until 2011. She later joined KEMRI/Wellcome Trust's Malaria Public Health Department, where she became head of their policy impact unit.

== Career ==
Omumbo is an epidemiologist who specializes in the relationship between climate change and infectious diseases, particularly the use of climate information to make African healthcare responsive to said diseases. Her work includes the use of geographic information systems for malaria epidemiology in the Horn of Africa and Kenya.

Omumbo co-chaired the World Meteorological Organization's COVID-19 Research Task Team and Climate Research for Development's Scientific Advisory Committee. She has also worked as the manager of a pan-African postdoctoral fellowship programme. She has also worked as a scientific/technical advisor at the World Health Organization's Special Programme for Research and Training in Tropical Diseases, AvecNet Project, and the World-Wide Anti-Malarial Resistance Network, and has also been part of the WMO Research Board and the HealthStrat Kenya board of directors.

== Award and Recognitions ==
Omumbo was elected Fellow of the African Academy of Sciences in 2012.

As of 2013, Omumbo lived in Palisades, New York.
