= Rashida Ferrand =

British physician and epidemiologist

Professor Rashida Ferrand FMedSci
- Education: Newcastle University
- Scientific career
- Workplaces: London School of Hygiene & Tropical Medicine
- Thesis: Burden of HIV infection and HIV-associated morbidity in Zimbabwean adolescents (2010)

Rashida Abbas Ferrand is a Pakistani physician and epidemiologist who is a professor at the London School of Hygiene & Tropical Medicine. Her research considers adolescent health and the development of interventions to improve outcomes for people living with HIV. She was awarded the 2018 Chalmers Medal, and elected a Fellow of the Academy of Medical Sciences in 2024.

== Early life and education ==
Ferrand studied medicine at Newcastle University. She specialised in internal medicine, and completed her specialist training in HIV/AIDS in London. Ferrand earned a master's degree in epidemiology at London School of Hygiene & Tropical Medicine. Her doctoral research, which was supported by the Wellcome Trust, investigated HIV-associated morbidity in Zimbabwean adolescents. She was supported by two Wellcome Trust fellowships to identify strategies to improve the outcomes of people living with HIV.

== Research and career ==
Ferrand has dedicated her career to the epidemiology of adolescent health and sexual and reproductive health at Southern Africa. She develops public health interventions, including evaluating the impact of a psychosocial nutritional care package for pregnant adolescents.

In 2003, Ferrand moved to Harare, where she works on public health interventions relevant to people in Zimbabwe. In 2012, she established the Zimbabwe LSHTM Research Partnership, which studied HIV prevention and care, as well as the long-term complications of HIV. In 2022, she renamed the partnership The Health Research Unit Zimbabwe ('THRU ZIM'), which is a multi-disciplinary research programme that focusses on equitable partnerships and initiatives that strengthen the Zimbabwean research capacity. She has studied the clinical manifestations and pathogenesis of children and adolescents with perinatally-acquired HIV. In 2018 Ferrand was awarded the Chalmers Medal.

Ferrand is the director of the CREATE PhD programme, a scheme which trains future global health researchers.

== Awards and honours ==
- 2014 Wellcome Trust International Engagement
- 2018 Chalmers Medal
- 2019 Wellcome Trust Research Enrichment
- 2024 Elected Fellow of the Academy of Medical Sciences

== Selected publications ==
- Elizabeth D Lowenthal; Sabrina Bakeera-Kitaka; Tafireyi Marukutira; Jennifer Chapman; Kathryn Goldrath; Rashida A Ferrand (July 2014). "Perinatally acquired HIV infection in adolescents from sub-Saharan Africa: a review of emerging challenges". Lancet Infectious Diseases. 14 (7): 627–39. doi:10.1016/s1473-3099(13)70363-3. ISSN 1473-3099. PMC 4074242. PMID 24406145. Wikidata Q27022471.
- Najmul Haider; Abdinasir Yusuf Osman; Audrey Gadzekpo; et al. (1 October 2020). "Lockdown measures in response to COVID-19 in nine sub-Saharan African countries". BMJ Global Health. 5 (10). doi:10.1136/bmjgh-2020-003319. ISSN 2059-7908. PMID 33028699. Wikidata Q100490377.
- Rashida A Ferrand; Elizabeth L Corbett; Robin Wood; John Hargrove; Chiratidzo E Ndhlovu; Frances M Cowan; Eleanor Gouws; Brian G Williams (1 September 2009). "AIDS among older children and adolescents in Southern Africa: projecting the time course and magnitude of the epidemic". AIDS. 23 (15): 2039–2046. doi:10.1097/qad.0b013e32833016ce. ISSN 0269-9370. PMC 3408596. PMID 19684508. Wikidata Q36128518.
