= St Joseph's Academy, Blackheath =

St Josephs Academy, Blackheath (Boys)

Location
- Blackheath, Greater London; England; 51°27′49″N 0°00′08″E

Information
- Type: Academy
- Motto: 'Animo et fide'
- Established: 1860
- Closed: 2007
- Grades: 7-11
- Enrolment: 965 (as of 2007)
- Campus: 10 acres (40,000 m^{2})
- Colours: Green and Yellow
- Affiliations: Roman Catholic

St Josephs Academy was an all-boys Roman Catholic academy located in Blackheath, London, England.

Saint Joseph's Academy began life in 1860 as an extension of the work of the De La Salle Brothers in Saint Joseph's College, Clapham. Bishop Grant asked them to start a new school in Saint George's parish, Kennington. The Brothers who taught in the academy initially belonged to the Clapham Community and travelled each day to Kennington (the Bishop agreed to provide the money for their fares on the omnibus). Then, in January 1865, they were set up as a separate Community under the leadership of Brother Acheul as the first Director. The academy operated in Kennington for 56 years. In 1916 it moved to Camberwell for a few years and finally it moved to Lee Terrace in 1919 to become Saint Joseph's Academy, Blackheath.

In 1977 Saint Joseph's Academy made the transition from grammar school to comprehensive school. Unfortunately, it did not cope well with the change and, in the 1980s, went into gradual decline, merging with Saint Austin's Boys School, Charlton; for some time the Saint Austin's site was used for the lower school. Eventually, the site in Charlton was repurposed as the site for Christ the King Sixth Form College before moving to its current site on Belmont Hill. Starting in the early 1990s, the school went through a particularly troubled period with a series of OFSTED inspections that placed it in a category of either 'special measures' or 'serious weaknesses' for eleven years.

In 2002, at the initiative of the headteacher, Peter Stickings, and the chairman of governors, Brother Ben Foy, it was suggested that the only remedy for the terminal decline of St Joseph's would be for it to become part of the Academies programme, which was then being vigorously promoted by the government as a way of rescuing schools in serious difficulties, especially in London. The proposal involved the closure not only of Saint Joseph's Academy but also that of the neighbouring Our Lady of Lourdes Primary School and their joint re-emergence as a 3-16 all-through co-educational Academy.

High-level discussions on the feasibility of the proposal took place involving the De La Salle Trustees, the Diocese of Southwark, the Department for Education and Science and Lewisham Borough Council. All parties agreed that it was an idea worth pursuing. The co-sponsors of the academy would be the Diocese and the De La Salle Trustees, the latter providing most of the land for the site of the new academy.

This academy emerged as St Matthew Academy as of September 2007.

== Notable former pupils ==
The following people have attended St. Joseph's Academy:

- Elijah Baker, actor
- Anthony Barness, footballer
- Edmund Michael Hubert Capper, Anglican bishop
- Anthony Costello, paediatrician, research scientist, director at WHO
- Jonathan Dove, composer of operas and choral works
- Kevin Burke, traditional Irish fiddler
- Ali Fuseini, footballer
- John Gallagher, All Black rugby player
- Jeremy Healy, musician and DJ
- John Henry, toxicologist
- Femi Ilesanmi, footballer
- David Lodge, author
- Tony Marchant, playwright
- Louis McCarthy-Scarsbrook, professional Rugby League player and England international
- Tom Raworth, writer and graphic artist
- John Regis, athlete
- Cherno Samba, footballer
- Jlloyd Samuel, footballer
- Dominic Tildesley, President of the Royal Society of Chemistry, Commander of the British Empire
- Louis Wain, artist
- Michael Worrincy, professional Rugby League player
- Rob Worrincy, professional Rugby League player

== Sources ==
Terry, Collins (June 2007). "Joseph and Matthew: A Tale of Two Academies" (PDF). Lasallians.
