= Liz Corbett =

British epidemiologist and researcher

Elizabeth Corbett FRCP FMedSci
- Born: Elizabeth Lucy Corbett
- Education: University of Cambridge (BS, MBBS); University of London (PhD)
- Awards: Chalmers Medal (2004)
- Scientific career
- Workplaces: London School of Hygiene & Tropical Medicine
- Thesis: Mycobacterial disease in South African gold miners : associations with HIV infection and occupational lung disease (2000)
- Website: www.lshtm.ac.uk/aboutus/people/corbett.liz

Elizabeth Lucy Corbett is a British epidemiologist who is Professor of Tropical Epidemiology at the London School of Hygiene & Tropical Medicine. Her research investigates the regulation of tuberculosis in HIV prevalent populations and improving access to HIV self-testing.

== Early life and education ==
Corbett studied natural sciences at the University of Cambridge and graduated in 1985. She remained there for her Bachelor of Medicine, Bachelor of Surgery and completed her training in 1989. In 1992 Corbett completed her membership of the Royal College of Physicians (MRCP) before earning a Diploma of Tropical Medicine and Hygiene in 1996. She moved to the London School of Hygiene & Tropical Medicine for her postgraduate research where she earned her PhD from the University of London in 2000. Her doctoral research investigated tuberculosis in relation to HIV in South African gold mining communities. That year she completed her specialist training in infectious diseases at the London Deanery. At the time she completed her training, medical services in developing countries were overwhelmed with deaths from HIV and tuberculosis.

== Research and career ==
Corbett joined the faculty at the London School of Hygiene & Tropical Medicine in 2000 and moved to Harare, Zimbabwe in 2001. She joined the LSHTM as a Wellcome Trust Fellow and established the country's first tuberculosis laboratory. Corbett decided to start in Zimbabwe as the country has quality medical education and good public health infrastructure, and Corbett recruited scientists and technicians from the local community. In 2005 she was awarded a Senior Research Fellowship which allowed her to evaluate tuberculosis screening protocols. Corbett worked with the World Health Organization HIV Department in Geneva to investigate the access that healthcare workers in African countries have to HIV testing and care. At the time HIV self-testing was not very accessible, but was the primary form of diagnosis for healthcare workers. Corbett worked with the World Health Organization to support self-testing for healthcare workers. The success of this project meant that Corbett moved to Malawi.

Since 2009 Corbett has worked as an Epidemiologist at the London School of Hygiene & Tropical Medicine and part of the Malawi Liverpool Wellcome Trust program based in Blantyre. She was promoted to Professor in 2012 and led the world's first large evaluation of HIV self-testing. She has since lobbied Unitaid and Population Services International to provide self-testing in six African countries, raising over $72 million to support research and community-level implementation. The HIV self-testing kits have since been taken up by 59 countries, and over 6 million were used in 2018. Alongside HIVself-testing, Corbett is interested in tuberculosis management in HIV prevalent populations. She has investigated whether sputum microscopy or X-ray based diagnostics could be used to diagnose cases of tuberculosis in communities impacted by high rates of tuberculosis and HIV, as well as whether HIV self-testing should be offered to people who have tuberculosis-like symptoms. She has investigated the epidemic of long-term survivors of perinatal HIV transmission. Alongside her scientific research, Corbett has designed research training and taught students at the Malawi College of Medicine.

=== Awards and honours ===
In 2018 Corbett was elected a Fellow of the Academy of Medical Sciences. She delivered the 2018 Stephen Lawn Memorial Lecture. Corbett has served on various advisory boards within the World Health Organization, including membership of the Strategic & Technical Advisory Group. Other awards and honours include;

- 1995 Dr Ethel Williams Prize for Natural Sciences from the University of Cambridge
- 2001 Woodruff Medal from the London School of Hygiene & Tropical Medicine
- 2003 Annual Scientific Prize of the International Union Against Tuberculosis and Lung Disease
- 2004 Awarded the Chalmers Medal by the Royal Society of Tropical Medicine and Hygiene
- 2007 Clinical Excellence Award from the Wellcome Trust
- 2010 Elected a Fellow of the Royal College of Physicians (FRCP)
- 2018 Elected a Fellow of the Academy of Medical Sciences (FMedSci)
- 2021: Awarded the Sir Rickard Christophers Medal

=== Selected publications ===
- The growing burden of tuberculosis: global trends and interactions with the HIV epidemic
- Tuberculosis in sub-Saharan Africa: opportunities, challenges, and change in the era of antiretroviral treatment
- HIV-1/AIDS and the control of other infectious diseases in Africa

== Personal life ==
Corbett is married with two children.
