= Sarah Rowland-Jones =

British physician

Sarah Louise Rowland-Jones FRCP
- Education: University of Oxford; University of Cambridge
- Children: 1
- Scientific career
- Workplaces: University of Oxford
- Thesis: The role of class I MHC molecules in the presentation of viral antigens to cytotoxic T lymphocytes. (1994)

Sarah Rowland-Jones is a British physician who is a Professor of Immunology at the University of Oxford. She works on immune responses to HIV infection. She has focussed her research on problems caused by HIV in Africa, with a hope to create a successful HIV vaccine. She is the former president of the Royal Society of Tropical Medicine and Hygiene.

== Early life and education ==
Rowland-Jones was a medical student at the University of Cambridge. She was a postgraduate student at the University of Oxford, where she specialised in infectious diseases. She was a junior doctor in London during the beginning of the AIDS epidemic, and became interested in HIV infection. Rowland-Jones returned to the University of Oxford where she was made a Medical Research Council Fellow. Her research considered immune response to HIV infection.

== Research and career ==
Rowland-Jones remained at Oxford throughout her medical career. She worked as a clinician scientist, senior fellow and, eventually, professor. Her research considered the impact of HIV in African communities. She was particularly interested in the immune responses of populations who were uninfected by highly exposed, for example infants with HIV positive mothers and sex workers. In particular, Rowland-Jones focussed on HIV–cytomegalovirus (CMV) coinfection and how this impacts pathogensis. She was elected Fellow of the Academy of Medical Sciences in 2000.

Rowland-Jones was made Director of the Oxford Centre for Tropical Medicine in 2001. The centre coordinates research in tropical medicine in low-income countries. She moved to The Gambia in 2004, where she oversaw research in the MRC Laboratories of The Gambia. She started working on HIV-2 as a model of attenuated HIV infection, and the role this may play in infant immune response.

In 2008, Rowland-Jones returned to Oxford, where she was made a Professor of Immunology. She holds a joint position in the Department of Infection, Immunity and Cardiovascular Disease at the University of Sheffield.

In 2018, Rowland-Jones was appointed President Elect of the Royal Society of Tropical Medicine and Hygiene. She served as president from 2018 to 2019. In 2020 she was appointed editor of the journal AIDS.

== Selected publications ==
- Victor Appay; P Rod Dunbar; Margaret Callan; et al. (1 April 2002). "Memory CD8+ T cells vary in differentiation phenotype in different persistent virus infections". Nature medicine. 8 (4): 379–385. doi:10.1038/nm0402-379. ISSN 1078-8956. PMID 11927944. Wikidata Q45733084.
- G S Ogg; X Jin; Sebastian Bonhoeffer; et al. (1 March 1998). "Quantitation of HIV-1-specific cytotoxic T lymphocytes and plasma load of viral RNA". Science. 279 (5359): 2103–2106. doi:10.1126/science.279.5359.2103. ISSN 0036-8075. PMID 9516110. Wikidata Q56930699.
- P J Goulder; R E Phillips; R A Colbert; et al. (1 February 1997). "Late escape from an immunodominant cytotoxic T-lymphocyte response associated with progression to AIDS". Nature medicine. 3 (2): 212–217. doi:10.1038/nm0297-212. ISSN 1078-8956. PMID 9018241. Wikidata Q73034306.
