= David Lalloo =

British medical researcher

David Griffith Lalloo, CMG is a British professor, clinical academic and researcher. He is Vice-Chancellor of Liverpool School of Tropical Medicine. His research focusses on infection diseases and envenoming.

Lalloo trained as a doctor in Newcastle upon Tyne. He was a contributor in the fifth edition of Wiley-Blackwell medical textbook Lecture Notes on Tropical Medicine, edited by Geoff V. Gill and Nick Beeching. 2024, he was elected as a fellow of the Academy of Medical Sciences.

Lalloo was appointed a Companion of the Order of St Michael and St George (CMG) in the 2025 Birthday Honours, for services to global health and international development, and leadership in higher education.

== Select publications ==
- Anuradhani Kasturiratne; A Rajitha Wickremasinghe; Nilanthi de Silva; et al. (2008). "The global burden of snakebite: a literature analysis and modelling based on regional estimates of envenoming and deaths". PLOS Medicine. 5 (11): e218. doi:10.1371/journal.pmed.0050218. PMC 2577696. PMID 18986210. Wikidata Q21090133.
- Neil French; Katherine Gray; Christine Watera; et al. (2002). "Cryptococcal infection in a cohort of HIV-1-infected Ugandan adults". AIDS. 16 (7): 1031–1038. doi:10.1097/00002030-200205030-00009. PMID 11953469. Wikidata Q38884510.
- Jeremy N Day; Tran T H Chau; Marcel Wolbers; et al. (2013). "Combination antifungal therapy for cryptococcal meningitis". The New England Journal of Medicine. 368 (14): 1291–1302. doi:10.1056/nejmoa1110404. PMC 3978204. PMID 23550668. Wikidata Q41924502.
