= Owen Price (footballer) =

Former English professional footballer

Personal information
- Date of birth: 20 October 1986 (age 40)
- Place of birth: Tooting, England
- Height: 1.78 m (5 ft 10 in)
- Position: Midfielder

Team information
- Current team: Erith & Belvedere (assistant)

Youth career
- Charlton Athletic
- 1999–2006: Tottenham Hotspur

Senior career*
Years	Team	Apps	(Gls)
2006	GIF Sundsvall		
2007	TPS	2	(0)
2007	Ljungskile SK		
2008	Northwich Victoria	2	(0)
2009–2011	Farnborough		
2011–2013	Lewes		
2013–2014	Farnborough		
- Carshalton Athletic
- Cray Wanderers
- → Erith Town (loan)
2016	Greenwich Borough		
2016–2017	Chatham Town		
2017	Hythe Town		
2017	Phoenix Sports		
2017	Erith & Belvedere		
- Rochester United
2018–2019	Lewisham Borough		
2019	Lordswood	0	(0)

Managerial career
- 2019–2020: Lordswood (assistant)
- 2020–: Erith & Belvedere (assistant)
- * Club domestic league appearances and goals

Owen Price (born 20 October 1986) is an English former professional footballer who played as a midfielder. He is an assistant manager with Erith & Belvedere.

== Club career ==
Price played in the system of Charlton Athletic, prior to being signed by Tottenham Hotspur in 1999; having impressed in a youth cup final, aged fourteen, at Arsenal's Highbury, scoring after 4.2 seconds which was named as a Guinness World Record. A year after signing, Tottenham and Charlton went to a tribunal after disagreements arose in regards to compensation for Price. In 2006, despite having years remaining on his Tottenham contract, Price went to Sweden after penning a deal with GIF Sundsvall of the Superettan. A move to Finland's TPS arrived in 2007, with the midfielder making pro appearances in the Veikkausliiga.

Later in 2007, Price moved back to Sweden with Ljungskile SK; where he reunited with David Wilson, who was his manager at GIF Sundsvall. Price returned to England in 2008, signing with Northwich Victoria. He featured in Conference fixtures against Rushden & Diamonds and Altrincham in December. He was with Farnborough between 2009 and 2011, which preceded a two-year stint with Lewes before he returned to Farnborough for the 2013–14 Conference South. Price then spent time with Carshalton Athletic, Cray Wanderers and, on loan, Erith Town. Price joined Greenwich Borough in July 2016; lasting three months.

Price signed for Hythe Town from Chatham Town in January 2017. He played for Phoenix Sports later that year. As he came off a spell as player-coach with Erith & Belvedere, Price agreed terms for the same role with Southern Counties East Football League Division One's Lewisham Borough in 2018. That move came via a stay with Rochester United. He went into coaching in June 2019. Despite becoming assistant manager with Lordswood, Price was named as a substitute for their FA Cup qualifying defeat to Steyning Town on 10 August; he didn't come on, but was sent off following a melee between the two benches.

== International career ==
Soon after joining Tottenham Hotspur, Price was called up by the England Schoolboys team.

== Coaching career ==
Having had staff roles whilst playing with Erith & Belvedere and Lewisham Borough, Price moved into a sole management role in June 2019 after joining Darren Anslow's staff at Lordswood as an assistant manager. He left in May 2020, a month prior to his coaching return to Erith & Belvedere under Del Oldfield; a club he made fifteen appearances in all competitions for back in 2017.

== Personal life ==
Price attended Ernest Bevin College, alongside Cherno Samba. Early in his career, Price signed a sponsorship deal with Adidas.

== Career statistics ==
Appearances and goals by club, season and competition
Club	Season	League			Cup		League Cup		Continental		Other		Total	
Club	Season	Division	Apps	Goals	Apps	Goals	Apps	Goals	Apps	Goals	Apps	Goals	Apps	Goals
TPS	2007	Veikkausliiga	2	0	0	0	—		—		0	0	2	0
Northwich Victoria	2008–09	Conference	2	0	0	0	—		—		0	0	2	0
Farnborough	2010–11	Conference North	9	0	0	0	—		—		0	0	9	0
Career total			13	0	0	0	—		—		0	0	13	0
