= Michael Barrett (parasitologist) =

British academic (born 1964)

Professor Michael Barrett OBE FRSE
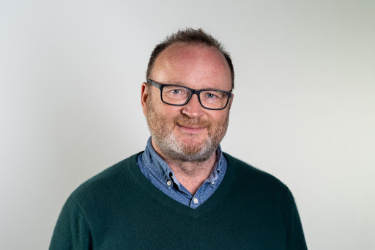
- Barrett in 2019
- Born: Michael Peter Barrett; 29 December 1964 (age 61); Harlow, United Kingdom
- Citizenship: United Kingdom
- Education: University College London (BSc) Queens' College, Cambridge (PhD)
- Spouse: Sophie Weston (m. 1997)
- Children: 2
- Awards: FRSE (2013) CA Wright Medal (2014) OBE (2021) FMedSci (2024)
- Scientific career
- Workplaces: University of Bordeaux London School of Hygiene & Tropical Medicine University of Glasgow

Michael Barrett OBE FMedSci FRSE (born 29 December 1964) is Professor of Biochemical Parasitology at the University of Glasgow. His research focuses on understanding how drugs work against parasites and how parasites become resistant to drugs. He is also Director of Glasgow Polyomics, a facility specialising in genomic, proteomic and metabolomic technologies, and directs the Scottish Universities Life Sciences Alliance (SULSA). Barrett advises several international organisations on issues surrounding drug development and resistance, including the World Health Organization (WHO) where he is part of the expert group on human African trypanosomiasis (sleeping sickness) and the Drugs for Neglected Diseases initiative (DNDi).

== Early life and education ==
Barrett was educated at Latton Green primary school and Latton Bush secondary school in Harlow, Essex. He studied Zoology at University College London (1983-1986), qualifying with BSc Hons (Class 1). He went on to study for a PhD in Pathology at the University of Cambridge (Queens’ College), graduating in 1990.

== Career and research ==
Barrett’s career in research has focused primarily on neglected tropical diseases, particularly the trypanosomiases and leishmaniases. From Cambridge, he spent several years in Bordeaux on a Royal Society fellowship before returning to the London School of Hygiene and Tropical Medicine. In 1996 he moved to Glasgow to set up his own laboratory. He has been involved in numerous projects seeking new drugs to treat these diseases and was director of new drug discovery at the Consortium of Parasitic Drug Development, a consortium centred at the University of North Carolina and funded by the Bill and Melinda Gates Foundation between 2003-2012. The group took pafuramidine, a new orally available drug for human African trypanosomiasis, through phase III clinical trials, although unanticipated toxicity issues halted development. He established the Scottish Metabolomics facility at the University of Glasgow that evolved into Glasgow Polyomics and his own research makes extensive use of genomics and metabolomics to identify drug modes of action and the mechanisms by which pathogens become resistant to drugs. To date, his group has identified new modes of action and resistance mechanisms to more than ten novel compounds that kill protozoa.

Barrett also writes regularly for a variety of newspapers and magazines on topics related to science and also spanning the arts and sciences interface, particularly the New Statesman. He is an enthusiastic proponent of public engagement with science and authored a booklet on “The Scottish Encounter with Tropical Disease".

== Awards and honours ==
Barrett was awarded an OBE for services to the National Health Service as Director at the Glasgow Lighthouse Laboratory during the COVID-19 pandemic in 2021. He was awarded the C.A. Wright medal by the British Society for Parasitology in 2014. He was elected as a Fellow of the Royal Society of Edinburgh in 2013 and a Fellow of the Academy of Medical Sciences in 2024.

== Personal life ==
Barrett married Dr. Sophie Weston in 1997 and they have two sons, Thomas (b. 2000) and Angus (b. 2001). He is a keen sportsman, moving on from football, rugby and cricket in earlier years to cycling and golf.
