= Alan Woodruff =

British medical doctor

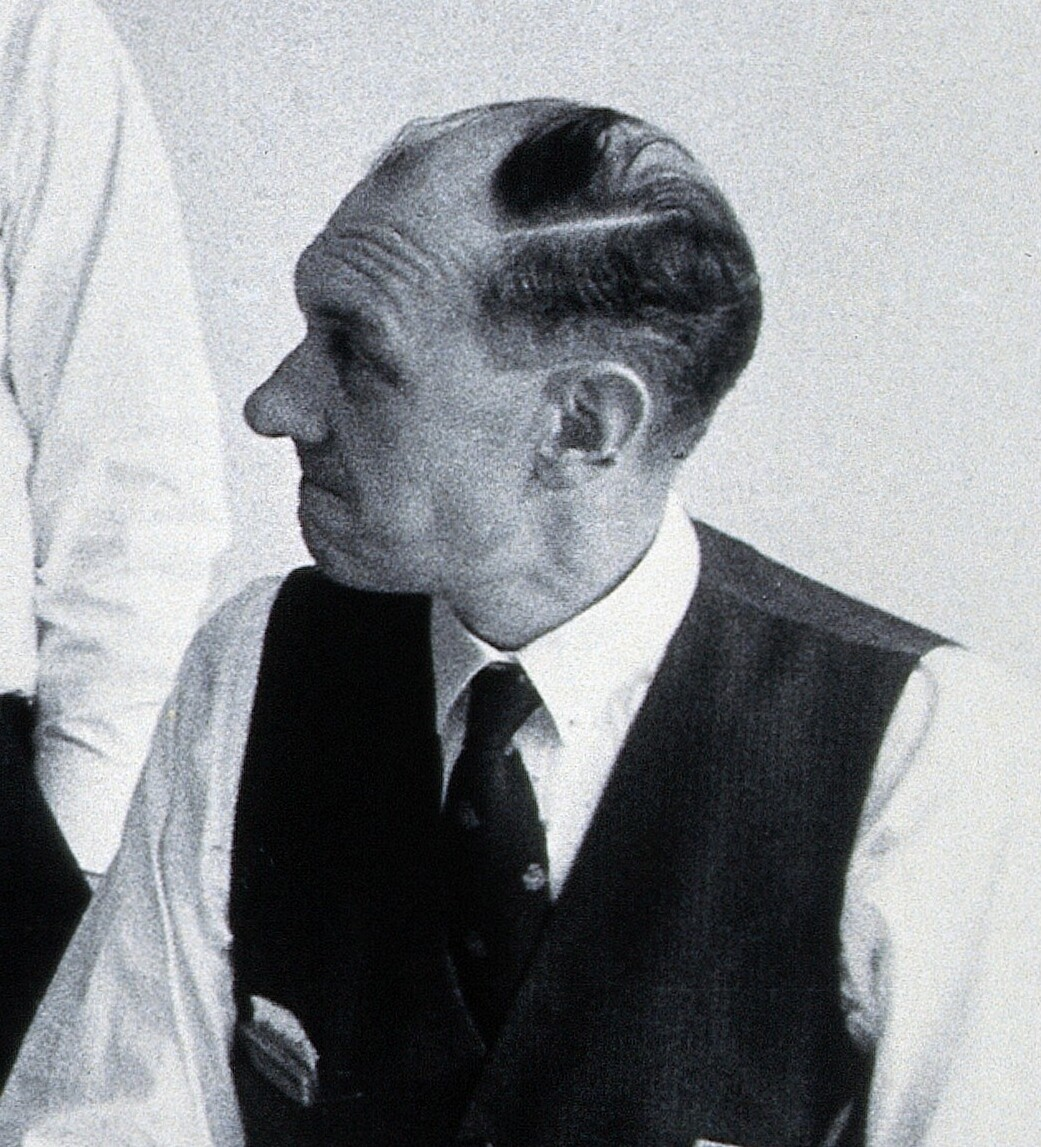
Credit: Wellcome Collection

Alan Waller Woodruff CMG OBE (27 June 1916 - 12 October 1992) was a British medical doctor, an expert on tropical diseases.

He was Wellcome Professor of Clinical Tropical Medicine at the London School of Hygiene and Tropical Medicine, from 1952 to 1981, and Professor of Medicine at the University of Juba, Sudan from 1981 until his death.

He was president of the Royal Society of Tropical Medicine from 1973 to 1975.
