= Chalmers Medal =

Royal Society of Tropical Medicine and Hygiene award

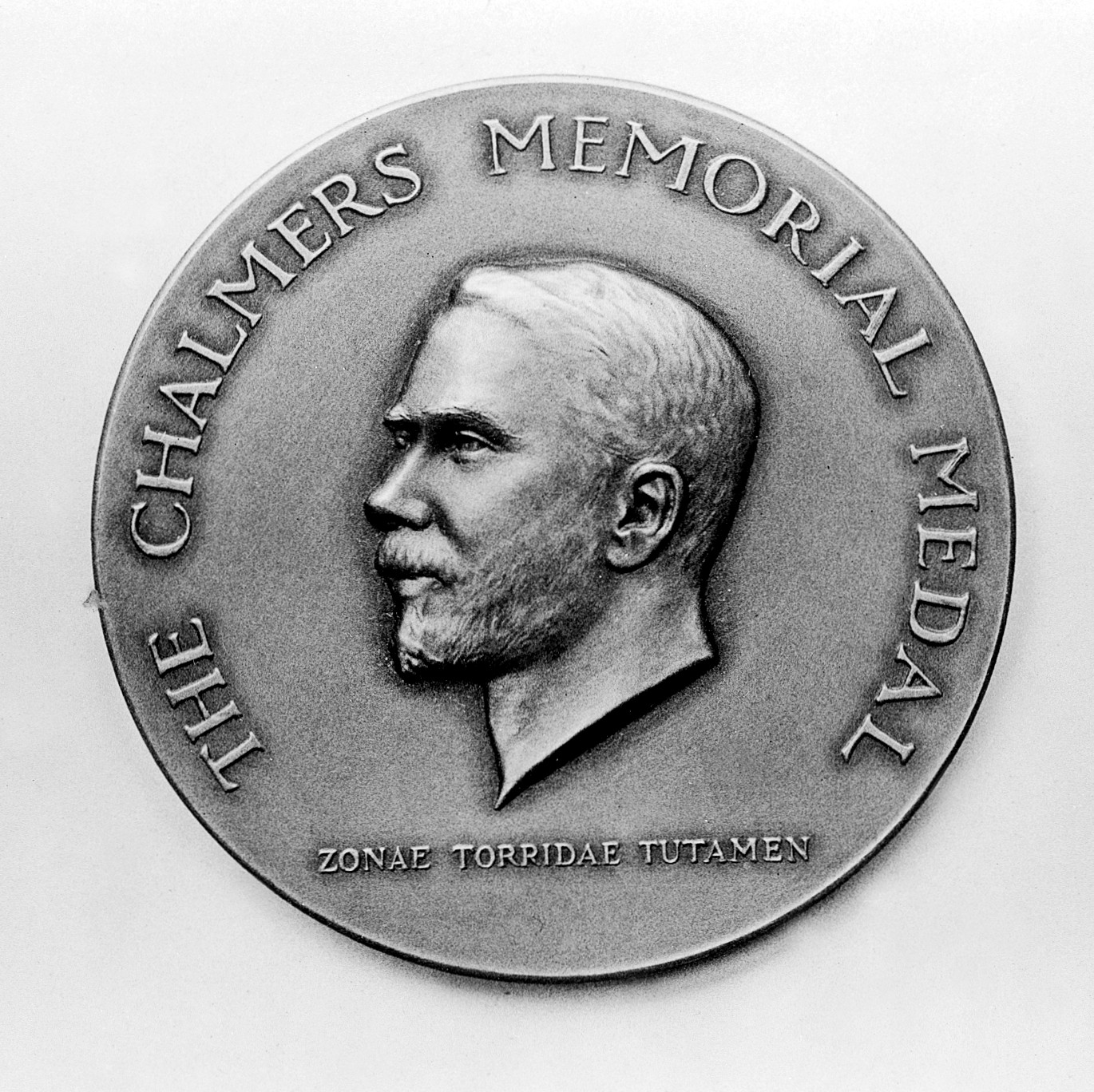
Chalmers medal obverse

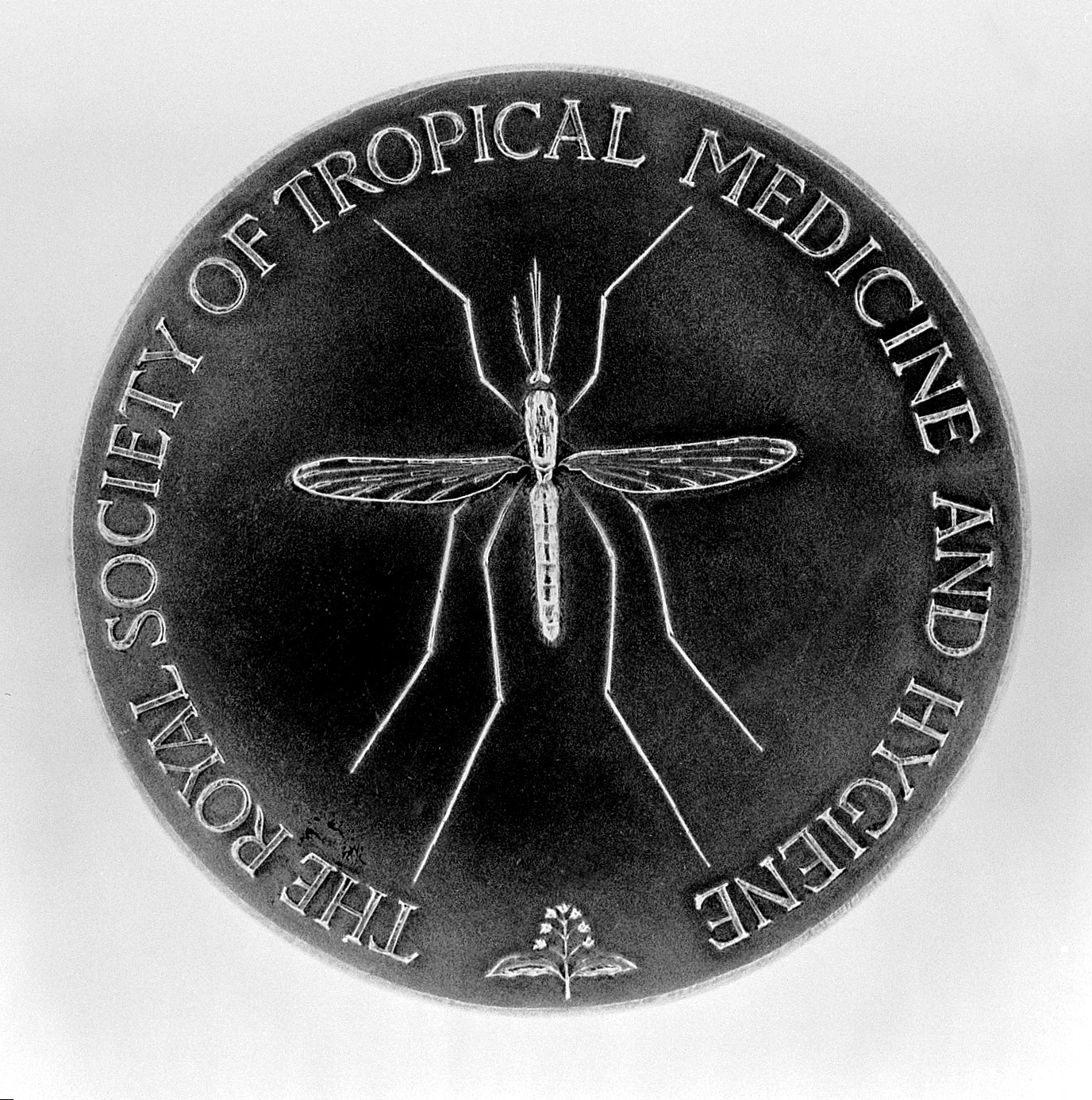
Chalmers medal reverse

The Chalmers Medal is the major mid-career award of the Royal Society of Tropical Medicine and Hygiene. The Chalmers Medal was initially awarded biennially, then annually, "in recognition of research of outstanding merit contributing to our knowledge of tropical medicine or tropical hygiene" and now "to researchers in tropical medicine or international health who obtained their last relevant qualification between 15 and 20 years ago, allowing for career breaks, who demonstrate evidence of mentoring and professional development of junior investigators, and other forms of capacity-building in line with Dr Chalmers’ own values". It is named in honour of Albert John Chalmers MD, FRCS, DPH, who was acclaimed for his work on tropical medicine on the Indian sub-continent.

The award was established in 1921 following a donation by Mrs Chalmers, the widow of Dr Chalmers, and consists of a silver gilt medal bearing the image of Dr Chalmers and the society's motto Zonae torridae tutamen (Guardian of the torrid zone) on one side, and a representation of Anopheles gambiae above a spray of the cinchona plant on the other.

== Recipients ==
Source: RSTMH

- 1923 Émile Roubaud
- 1925 Warrington Yorke, FRS
- 1927 H. Lyndhurst Duke
- 1929 John Alexander Sinton, VC, FRS
- 1931 Neil Hamilton Fairley, FRS
- 1933 Saul Adler, FRS
- 1935 William H. Taliaferro
- 1937 Rupert M. Gordon
- 1939 Max Theiler
- 1941 John W. Field
- 1943 Robert Kirk
- 1945 Emanuel M. Lourie
- 1947 David G. Davey
- 1949 James Henderson Sutherland Gear
- 1951 Brian Gilmore Maegraith
- 1953 David J. Lewis
- 1955 William Edgar Kershaw
- 1957 Alexander J. Haddow, FRS
- 1959 J. Ralph Audy
- 1961 C.E. Gordon Smith
- 1963 Ian A. McGregor, FRS
- 1965 Michael Thomas Gillies
- 1967 Ronald Harry Wharton
- 1969 Brian Oliver Lyndhurst Duke
- 1971 Ralph Lainson, FRS
- 1972 William W. MacDonald
- 1973 Philip D. Marsden
- 1974 Alister Voller
- 1975 David I.H. Simpson
- 1976 A.R. Gray
- 1977 Brian M. Greenwood
- 1978 Jeffrey J. Shaw
- 1979 Anthony Bryceson
- 1980 David J. Bradley
- 1981 David A. Warrell
- 1982 Mario Coluzzi
- 1983 George A.M. Cross
- 1984 Richard W. Ashford
- 1985 Richard Carter
- 1986 Michael A. Miles
- 1987 David Hurst Molyneux
- 1988 Roy M. Anderson
- 1989 David L. Sacks
- 1990 Anthony E. Butterworth, FRS
- 1991 Kamini N. Mendis
- 1992 Sebastian B. Lucas
- 1993 Nicholas J. White
- 1994 Kevin Marsh
- 1995 Kevin M. De Cock
- 1996 Donald A.P. Bundy
- 1997 Charles F. Gilks
- 1998 Richard J. Hayes
- 1999 Robert W. Snow
- 2000 Felicity T. Cutts
- 2000 Alimuddin Zumla
- 2001 Peter Winstanley
- 2002 Francois Nosten
- 2003 David C. Kaslow
- 2004 Elizabeth L. Corbett
- 2005 Peter Mwaba
- 2006 Nicholas P. J. Day
- 2007 Jeremy J. Farrar
- 2008 Michael C. English
- 2009 Vikram Patel
- 2010 Jurg Utzinger
- 2011 Christopher J. M. Whitty
- 2012 Stephen Lawn
- 2013 Joanne Webster
- 2014 Philip Bejon
- 2015 Simon I. Hay
- 2016 Abdisalan Noor
- 2017 Azra Ghani
- 2018 Rashida Ferrand
- 2019 Samson Kinyanjui
- 2020 Katharina Kranzer
- 2021 Charles Wondji
- 2022 John A. Crump
- 2023 Faith Hope Among’in Osier
- 2024 Taane Clark
- 2025 Joel Tarning
- 2026 Sitara Swarna Rao Ajjampur

== See also ==
- List of medicine awards
