= Christ the King Sixth Form College =

Sixth form college in London, England

Coordinates: 51°27′51″N 0°00′09″W

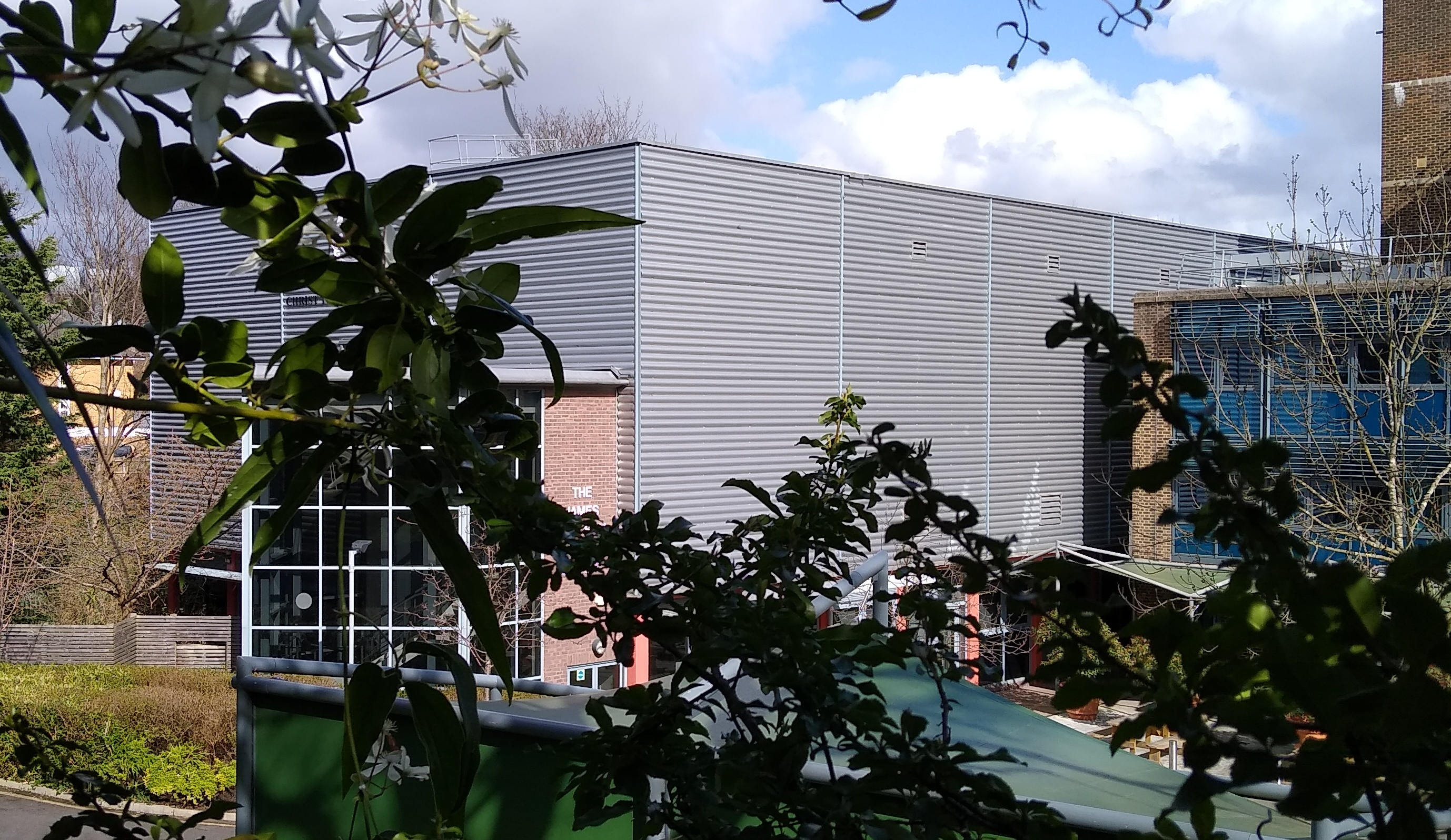
- CTK Emmanuel

Location
- Belmont Grove, Lewisham, London SE13 5GE; England

Information
- Type: Sixth form college
- Religious affiliation: Roman Catholic
- Established: 1992; 34 years ago
- Department for Education URN: 130416 Tables
- Ofsted: Reports
- Gender: Coeducational
- Age: 16 to 19
- Website: https://www.ctksfc.ac.uk/

Christ the King Sixth Forms are sixth form colleges based over three sites in South London, England. The college was first founded in 1992 by the Catholic Church on a site in Lewisham owned by the Archdiocese of Southwark, it welcomes students from all religions and backgrounds. The college is a free-standing institution responsible for its own affairs. The original site in Lewisham is called Christ the King: Emmanuel.

The college is run by its Principal and senior staff, whose appointment is one of the tasks of the governing body. The Church provides guidelines to ensure that the institution retains its Catholic ethos. The college is also accountable to its public funder, the Education Funding Agency.

== History ==
In 2004, the College was awarded Beacon status. The college was the first of its kind to be judged outstanding under the new Ofsted inspection régime.

In 2008 St. Luke's College, (formerly St. Mary and St. Joseph's RC School) in Sidcup became part of Christ the King Sixth Form College, being re-opened at Christ the King: St Mary's. This had previously been the site of St Mary & St Joseph's Catholic School, a Roman Catholic secondary school.

On 1 February 2013 Crossways Sixth Form in Telegraph Hill was closed and the site taken over under the name Christ the King: Aquinas.

== Curriculum ==
The sixth forms provide instruction in: AS/A Level subjects; the Level 1 Introductory course; Level 2 and Level 3 vocational courses;and also BTEC courses; and in three re-sit GCSE subjects: mathematics, English language and science. Students also receive tutorials and general lessons in religious education. Mass is observed once a week in chapel. The college has two full-time lay chaplains and one part-time priest chaplain.

In 2019, Christ the King Sixth Forms announced that they would be remodelling the curriculum offer for 2020;

CTK Aquinas will become a selective A Level centre, where students can choose from over 21 A Levels (Entry criteria will be selective with an average grade 6)

CTK Emmanuel will become a professional centre for excellence, where students will be offered high quality vocational courses, with the emphasis on University progression.

CTK St Mary’s will continue to offer a range of both BTEC and A Level courses at a sixth from centre.

The following "partner" schools get priority when it comes to admissions:

- Bonus Pastor Catholic College
- Trinity Church of England School
- St Matthew Academy
- St Michael's Catholic College
- St Paul's Academy
- St Thomas More Catholic School
- St Ursula's Convent School
- Conisborough College

== Awards ==
In 2013 a team from the college won the national Animation13 competition run by Manchester University.
