= Rickard Christophers =

British zoologist and medical entomologist (1873–1978)

Sir Rickard Christophers CIE OBE FRS
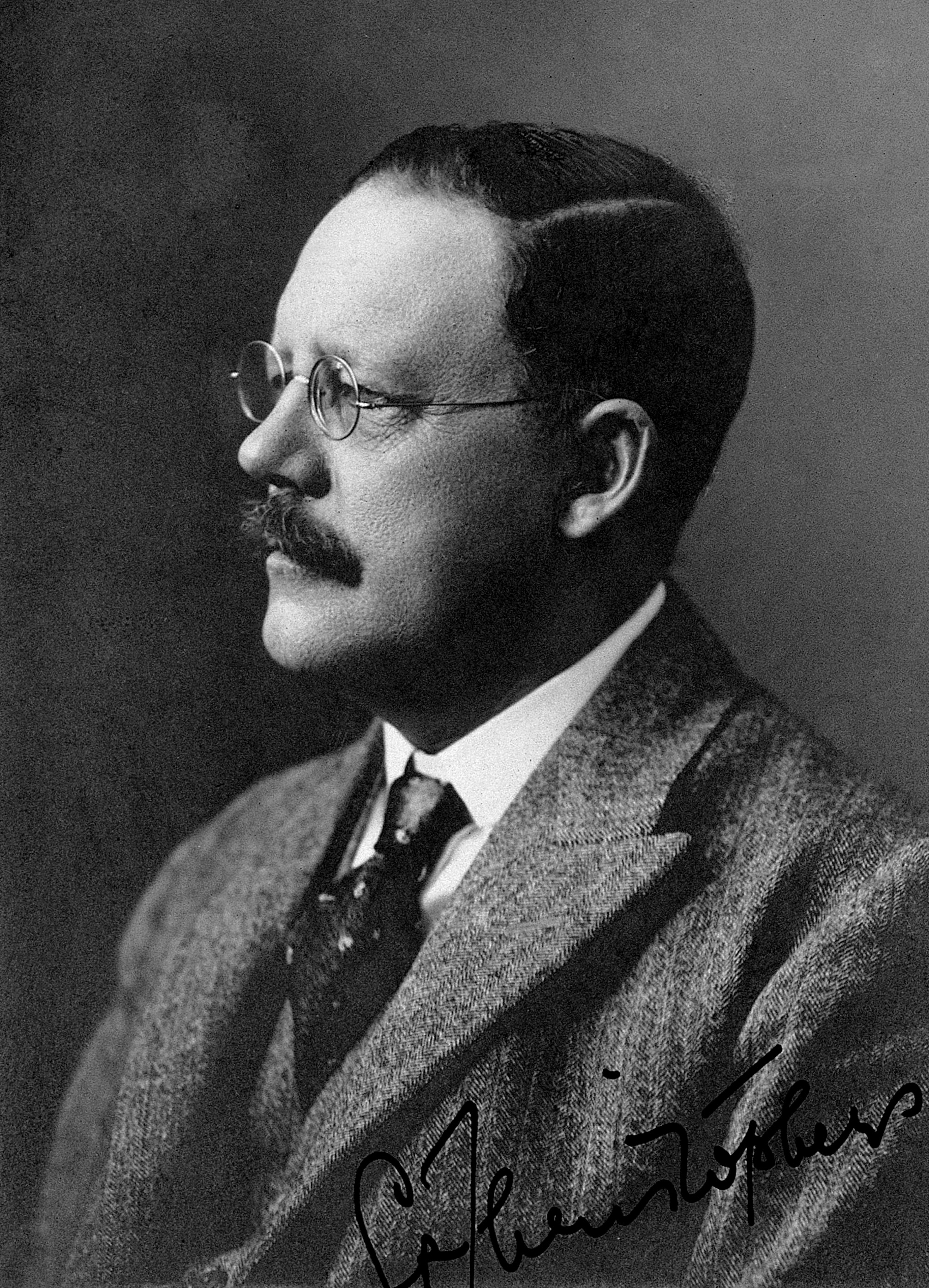
- Born: Samuel Rickard Christophers; 27 November 1873; Liverpool, England
- Died: 19 February 1978 (aged 104); Broadstone, Dorset, England
- Education: University of Liverpool (MB)
- Spouse: Elise Emma Sherman (m. 1902; died 1962)
- Children: 1
- Awards: Manson Medal (1944); Buchanan Medal (1952)
- Scientific career
- Fields: Protozoology; medical entomology
- Military career
- Allegiance: United Kingdom
- Branch: Indian Medical Service
- Service years: 1902–1919
- Rank: Brevet Colonel
- Conflicts: World War I

Sir Samuel Rickard Christophers CIE OBE FRS) (27 November 1873 – 19 February 1978) was a British protozoologist and medical entomologist specialising in mosquitoes.

== Early life and education ==
Christophers was born and raised in Liverpool, the son of Samuel Hunt Christophers and Mary Selina Christophers (née Rickard) and educated at the Liverpool Institute and University of Liverpool, graduating MB in 1896.

== Career ==
In 1897, he took part in an Amazonian expedition and in 1898 went to Italy as part of the Malaria Commission, followed by a trip to Africa to study malaria. In 1901, the Malaria Commission moved to India.

On his return to England in 1902, he became a Lieutenant in the Indian Medical Service, moving back to India in 1904. In 1910 he was appointed the first Director of the Central Malaria Bureau, coordinating anti-malarial training and research throughout India. He spent World War I on anti-malaria duties in Iraq and in 1919 returned again to India as Director of the Central Research Institute at Kasauli in the foothills of the Himalayas.

Christophers was also an honorary physician to King George V from 1927 to 1930. He was awarded CIE in 1915, OBE in 1918 and knighted in 1931. He retired from the Indian Medical Service 27 November 1930 a Brevet Colonel. On his retirement in 1932–38, he joined the London School of Hygiene & Tropical Medicine where he became Professor of Malaria Studies in the University of London and Leverhulme Fellow of the Medical Research Council in charge of the Malaria unit at the LSHTM. In 1944 Christophers was awarded the Manson Medal by the Royal Society of Tropical Medicine and Hygiene for his significant contribution to the fields of tropical medicine and hygiene.

Sir Philip Manson-Bahr, son-in-law of Sir Patrick Manson, described Sir Rickard Christophers in 1956:

'Christophers is known everywhere for his endearing qualities. He has a modest bearing and a curious hesitant manner accompanied by a cheerful giggle. He is the friend, philosopher and mentor of all keen young men of science'

== Personal life and death ==
He had married Elise Emma Sherman in London in September 1902. She was the daughter of the owner of a coffee estate in India. Their first child, Elise Iseult, was born in June 1903 in Allahabad, India, and their son, Samuel Vagn, in December the following year in Madras. Lady Christophers died in England in 1962.

He on 19 February 1978 died at Broadstone, Dorset.

== Awards ==
He was elected a Fellow of the Royal Society in May 1926. He was the sixteenth president of the Royal Society of Tropical Medicine and Hygiene from 1939 to 1943.

An expert on tropical medicines, Christophers studied many diseases, particularly malaria. His work on the research of this disease won him the Royal Society's 1952 Buchanan Medal for "outstanding research" on the Anopheles mosquito that transmitted malaria. In his career he also contributed to the taxonomy of other parasites.

== Works ==
- A summary of the recent observations upon the Anopheles of the Middle East. Indian Journal of Medical Research 7, pp. 710–716 (1920).
- With Shortt, H.E.: Malaria in Mesopotamia. Indian Journal of Medical Research 8, pp. 508–529 (1921).
- The Fauna of British India, Including Ceylon and Burma. Diptera Volume IV (1933).
