= Mick Gillies =

English medical entomologist

Michael Thomas Gillies (15 September 1920 – 10 December 1999) was an English medical entomologist. He spent most of his working life in the tropics, particularly Tanzania (then known as Tanganyika) and later The Gambia, studying the transfer of malaria between mosquitos and humans. He was awarded the Chalmers and Sir Rickard Christophers Medals for his seminal contribution to the understanding of the role of mosquito behaviour in the transfer of malaria. He was also a world authority on the mayfly.

Gillies was not only highly respected for his academic achievements; he was widely loved for his warm and humorous personality.

He was the youngest son of the eminent plastic surgeon Sir Harold Gillies, but was also proud to be descended from one of Edward Lear's sisters. He is survived by two daughters from his first marriage to Agnes Sleigh, Susie Winter and Jacqueline Gillies, and by his second wife, Eva Gillies.
