= Lecture Notes on Tropical Medicine =

Tropical medicine book, edited by Dion R. Bell, Nick Beeching, and Geoff Gill

Lecture Notes on Tropical Medicine, also known and sold as Lecture Notes: Tropical Medicine and Tropical Medicine Lecture Notes is an introductory tropical medicine book published originally in 1981 by Blackwell Scientific and, subsequently, by Wiley-Blackwell. The seventh edition was published in 2014.

== Publication history ==
Tropical Medicine was originally published by Blackwell Scientific in 1981, written solely by Dion R. Bell. A second edition was released in 1985, a third in 1990, and a fourth in 1995, all edited by Dion R. Bell, though the fourth edition included sections by other authors. In 2004 a fifth edition was published, this time edited by Nick Beeching and Geoff Gill. Gill and Beeching also worked as editors on the sixth and seventh editions of the text, published in 2009 and 2014.

In the early 1980s, Bell wrote and released a companion book: Multiple Choice Questions on Lecture Notes on Tropical Medicine. It contained 200 questions and was sold for £3.5 (1984) (equivalent to £11.76 or US$15.03 in 2024)

=== Authors ===
The first edition was written entirely by Bell, but by the fourth edition, the decision had been made to include sections written by other authors. The fifth edition was multi-authored completely by professors of the Liverpool School of Tropical Medicine, and, out of the sixth edition's twenty one contributors, all but one were connected to the school, Liverpool University or the Royal Liverpool University Hospital.

==== Fourth edition ====
- Ray Fox
- Charles Gilks
- Malcolm Molyneux
- David Smith
- David Theakston
- George B. Wyatt

==== Fifth edition ====
- Imelda Bates
- Nick Beeching
- Tom Blanchard
- Martin Dedicoat
- Neil French
- Charles Gilks
- Geoff Gill
- Rachel Kneen
- David Lalloo
- Diana Lockwood
- Malcolm Molyneux
- Fred Nye
- Tim O'Dempsey
- Chris Parry
- Paul Shears
- Tom Solomon
- Bertie Squire
- Miriam Taegtmeyer
- George Wyatt

== Reception ==
The book has been widely used in undergraduate and graduate programs.

The first edition was criticized by a review in Infection Control & Hospital Epidemiology for lacking illustrations, references, and coverage of most viral and bacterial diseases, though noted that its "strength of the book [was] found in the author's first-hand knowledge and presentations of protozoan and parasitic illnesses".

A 1995 British Journal of Dermatology praised the fourth edition for its concision and general overview of various diseases. The reviewer was appreciative of the illustrations, which they described as superior to "out of focus" and "clinical" photographs. The Transactions of the Royal Society of Tropical Medicine and Hygiene described Bell's editing style in the first four editions and "clear and didactic", though found the further reading sections dated, and described the book overall as lacking comprehension. In the journal's review of the fifth edition, Chris Whitty noted the book's editorial change, and said that, though he found that "some of the consistency between chapters [had been] lost", he still found the book "clear, and well written". In particular, he praised the coverage of leprosy and malaria, and the book's expanded discussion of HIV, though noted the book's omission of certain presentations of diseases in various regions, such as the presentation of fungal skin infections alongside HIV in Southeast Asia.

In the Travel Medicine and Infectious Disease's review of the sixth edition, reviewer Peter Leggat felt that the text was lacking due to its minimal usage of photographs, and said that, by this edition, the " lecture notes style... has gradually come of age". He noted the absence of information on emerging infectious diseases, whose presence he acknowledged might have "quickly date[d] chapters", but which overall he felt was important to discuss.
