= Blantyre coma scale =

- Purpose: assess malarial coma in children.

The Blantyre coma scale is a modification of the Pediatric Glasgow Coma Scale, designed to assess malarial coma in children.

It was designed by Terrie Taylor and Malcolm Molyneux in 1987, and named for the Malawian city of Blantyre, site of the Blantyre Malaria Project.

== Using the scale ==
The score assigned by the Blantyre coma scale is a number from 0 to 5. The score is determined by adding the results from three groups: Motor response, verbal response, and eye movement.

The minimum score is 0 which indicates poor results while the maximum is 5 indicating good results. All scores under 5 are considered abnormal.

=== Eye movement ===
- 1 – Watches or follows
- 0 – Fails to watch or follow

=== Best motor response ===
- 2 – Localizes painful stimulus (patient's ability to remove stimuli)
- 1 – Withdraws limb from painful stimulus
- 0 – No response or inappropriate response

=== Best verbal response ===
- 2 – Cries appropriately with pain, or, if verbal, speaks
- 1 – Moan or abnormal cry with pain
- 0 – No vocal response to pain
