= Rupert Montgomery Gordon =

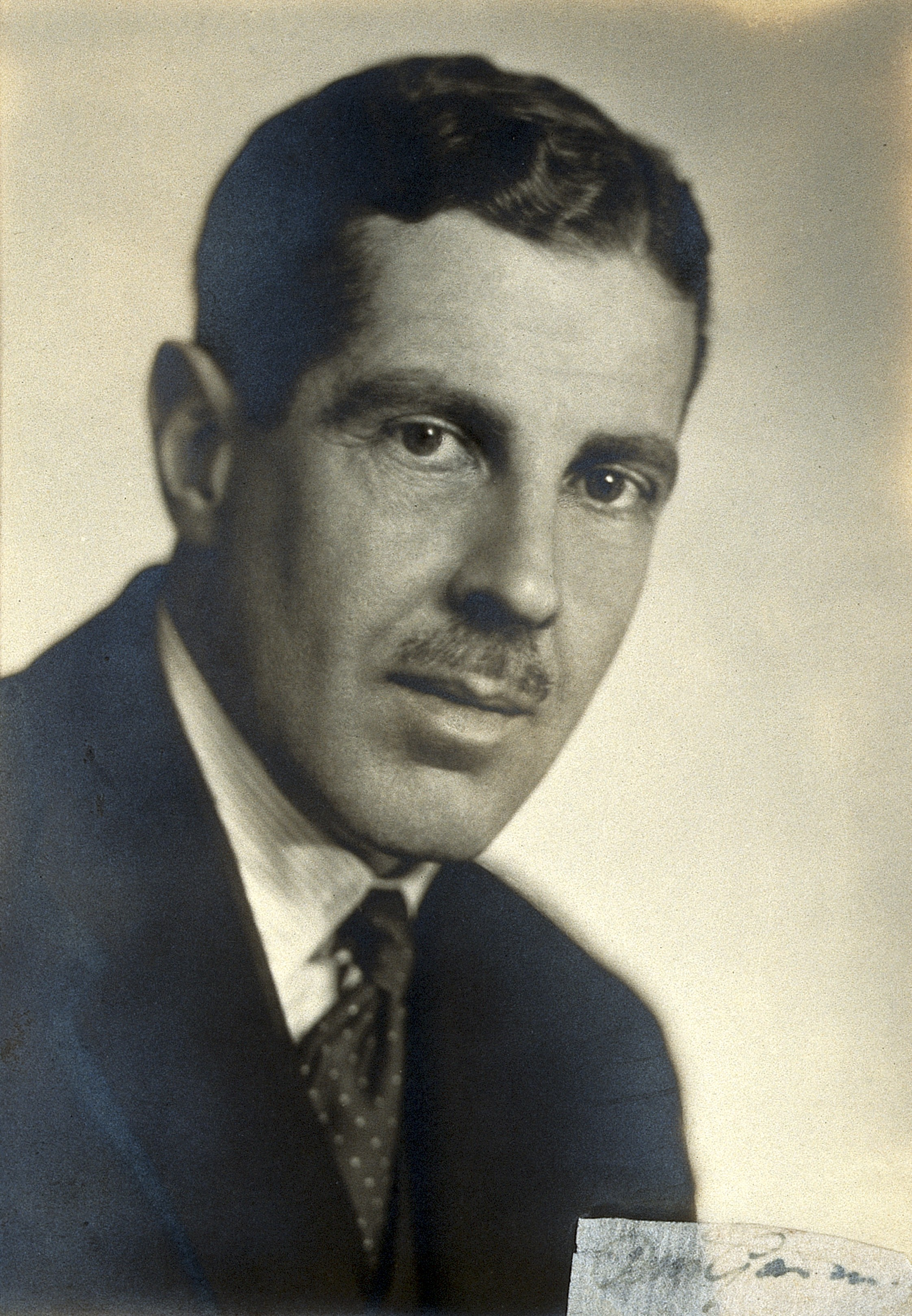

Rupert Montgomery Gordon (August 23, 1898 – July 26, 1961) was a British professor of parasitology and entomology at the Liverpool School of Tropical Medicine. He worked on rickettsial, protozoal, and metazoan parasites and their vectors.

Gordon was born in Phoenix Park, Dublin, the son of Dr S.T. Gordon. He studied at Strangeways School and then went to Trinity College, Dublin, and graduated with M.B., B.Ch. in 1916. He then joined the Royal Army Medical Corps serving in Serbia under C.M. Wenyon. He then became in-charge of field lab in Greece. After World War I ended, he did a diploma in tropical medicine in Liverpool and joined the staff thereafter. He worked in laboratories in Manaus, Brazil for two years, followed by thirteen years in Sierra Leone and then returned to England in 1937 and served as a professor until his retirement.

Gordon developed methods for feeding vectors such as mosquitoes through a membrane; studied schistosomiasis, metazoan immunity, the use of screens for mosquitoes, feeding behaviour, filariasis, polymorphic trypanosomes, and a range of other subjects. He published more than a hundred research papers. He wrote a textbook on medical entomology along with M.M.Lavoipierre, which was posthumously published as Entomology for Students of Medicine (1962).

He was awarded the Chalmers Medal in 1937, and an OBE in 1938.
