= Anthony Costello =

British paediatrician (born 1953)

Anthony Costello FMedSci FRCPCH FRCP
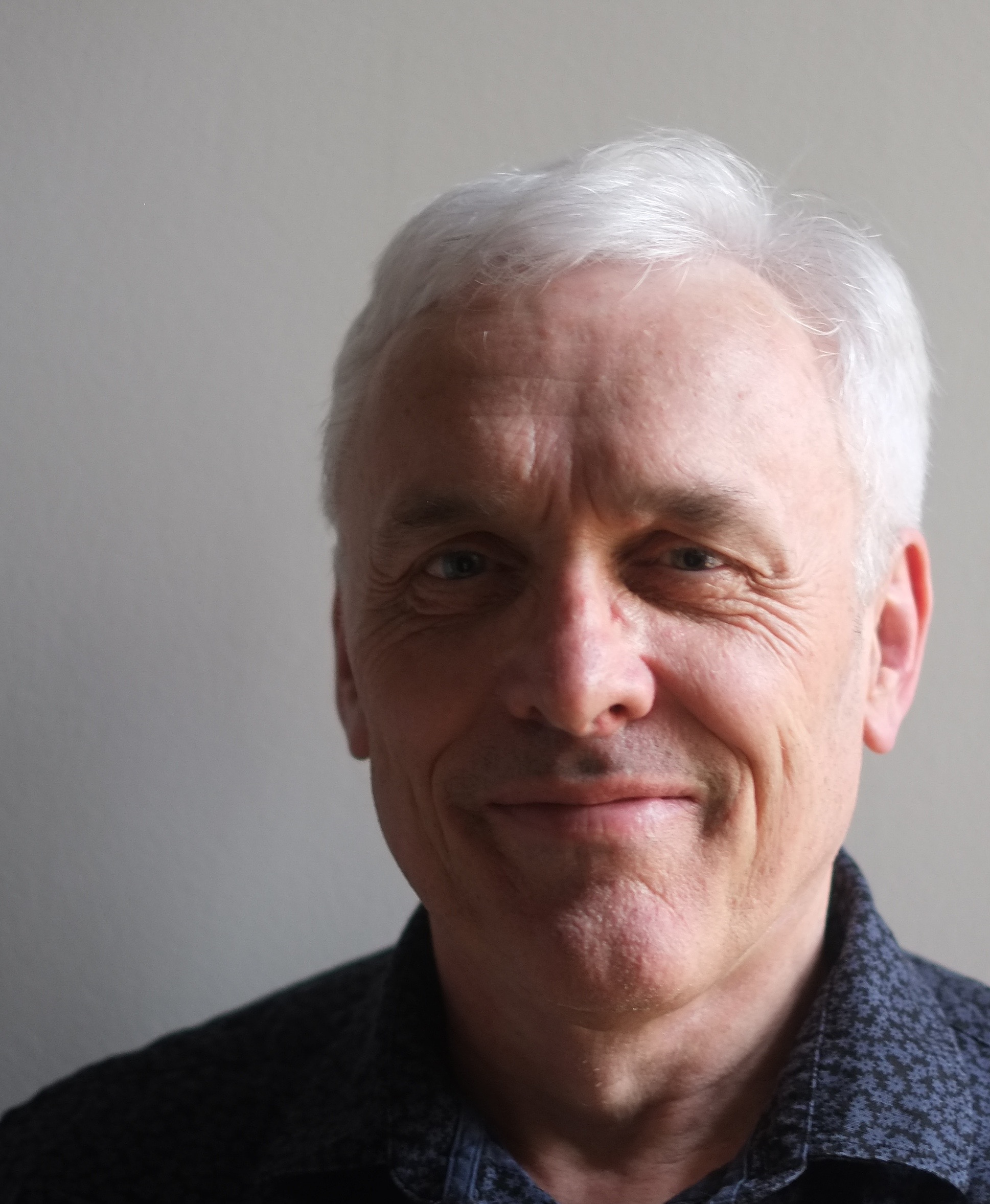
- Costello in 2016
- Born: 20 February 1953 (age 73)
- Education: St Joseph's Academy, Blackheath; St Catharine's College, Cambridge; Middlesex Hospital
- Known for: Improving the health of newborn infants and mothers in developing countries
- Awards: James Spence Medal
- Scientific career
- Fields: Pediatrics
- Workplaces: University College London World Health Organization
- Doctoral students: Joy Lawn

Anthony Costello (born 20 February 1953) is a British paediatrician. Until 2015 Costello was Professor of International Child Health and Director of the Institute for Global Health at the University College London. Costello is most notable for his work on improving survival among mothers and their newborn infants in poor populations of developing countries. From 2015 to 2018 he was director of maternal, child and adolescent health at the World Health Organization in Geneva.

== Early life and education ==
Costello was born in Beckenham, and graduated from school at St Joseph's Academy, Blackheath. Costello attended St Catharine's College, Cambridge, where he was awarded a degree in Experimental Psychology and qualified as a doctor in Medical Sciences after clinical training at the Middlesex Hospital in London. He then trained in Paediatrics and Neonatology at University College London. His aunt was the atheist activist Barbara Smoker.

== Career and research ==
=== Community mobilisation ===
After living in Baglung district in western Nepal from 1984 to 1986, two days' walk from a road, he became interested in challenges to mother and child health in poor, remote populations. His areas of scientific expertise include the evaluation of cost-effective interventions to reduce maternal and newborn deaths, women's groups, strategies to tackle malnutrition, international aid and the health effects of climate change. In 1999 he published a pioneering book on how to improve newborn infant health in developing countries.

With a Nepali organisation (MIRA), that he helped to establish, a large community trial of participatory learning and action using women's groups in the remote mountains of Makwanpur District, Nepal was published in The Lancet in 2004. He went on to establish partnerships and further studies with local organisations in East India, Mumbai, Bangladesh and Malawi. Seven cluster randomised controlled trials of women's groups in Nepal, India, Bangladesh and Malawi, led to a meta-analysis published in the Lancet in May 2013.

Results showed that in populations where more than 30% of pregnant women joined the women's group programme, maternal death and newborn deaths were cut by one third. The intervention has now been recommended by the World Health Organization (WHO) for scale-up in poor, rural populations.

Costello has led teams involved in more than a dozen cluster randomized controlled trials to show the power of community mobilization to affect health outcomes such as maternal and newborn deaths, child nutrition and diabetes. In November 2018 he published the book The Social Edge. The Power of Sympathy Groups for our Health, Wealth and Sustainable Future. The book explains why a new science of cooperation is needed and suggests twenty two social experiments which use sympathy groups for resolving 21st century problems.

=== Climate change ===
Costello chaired the 2009 Lancet Commission on Managing the Health Effects of Climate Change, and was co-chair of a new Lancet Commission which links the UK, China, Norway and Sweden on emergency actions to tackle the climate health crisis, published in June 2015. In 2015 he led the development of the Lancet Countdown: Tracking Progress on Health and Climate Change. These annual reports, developed by a network of 38 universities and research institutions, produces an annual Lancet report on the health impacts, adaptation progress, renewable energy, economics and public engagement related to climate change.

=== World Health Organization ===
At WHO he helped to develop the Global Strategy for Women's, Children's and Adolescents' Health (2016‒2030) with its three objectives of surviving, thriving and transforming – to end preventable mortality, to promote health and well-being, and to expand enabling environments. Its guiding principles include equity, universality, human rights, development effectiveness and sustainability.

With the WHO team, Costello also launched the global accelerated action for the health of adolescents (AA-HA!) and established an expert review group called Maternal and Newborn Information for tracking Outcomes and Results (MONITOR) to harmonize maternal and newborn health indicators.

In February 2017, together with UNICEF and the United Nations Population Fund (UNFPA), Costello helped to launch the Network for Improving Quality of Care for Maternal, Newborn and Child Health to introduce evidence-based interventions to improve quality of care for maternal and newborn health supported by a learning system. The Network aims to improve care in Ethiopia, Nigeria, India, Bangladesh, Malawi, Côte d'Ivoire, Uganda, Tanzania and Ghana. He also led work on community empowerment for family health - what it means, how to measure it, and how to plan interventions at the district level. With UNICEF, he helped coordinate a new Lancet Commission on redesigning child health for sustainable development goals.

=== Children in All Policies ===
While at WHO Costello set up a WHO UNICEF Lancet Commission, chaired by the Right Honorable Helen Clark, former Prime Minister of New Zealand, and Dr Awa Coll-Seck, Minister of State for Senegal, which comprised 41 experts from around the world and led to a report in the Lancet on 'A Future for our Children'. In 2020, based on this commission, he led the development of Children in All Policies 2030 which has set up links in Argentina, Senegal, Ghana, South Africa, India, Nepal and the Pacific Islands. The focus of the work is on building a commitment to children in all sectors of government, to placing children at the centre of sustainable development policies, advocacy for climate change and strategies to protect children from commercial exploitation.

=== Independent SAGE ===
In May 2020 Costello helped to set up the Independent Scientific Advisory Group for Emergencies, better known as Independent SAGE is a group of scientists, unaffiliated to government (although some are also in the government SAGE), that aims to provide advice to the United Kingdom government regarding the COVID-19 pandemic. The group, chaired by Sir David Anthony King, a former Government Chief Scientific Advisor, was formed in early May 2020 to "provide a clear structure on which an effective policy should be based given the inevitability that the virus will continue to cross borders". Costello had argued early on in the pandemic that the UK had neglected public health interventions recommended by WHO, that the government advisers did not include independent public health experts, and that the UK government and SAGE view that the virus could not be suppressed was wrong. When Asian states showed that suppression of the pandemic could be achieved in early March 2020, SAGE declared in their minutes of 13 March that "SAGE was unanimous that measures seeking to completely suppress spread of COVID-19 will cause a second peak. SAGE advises that it is a near certainty that countries such as China, where heavy suppression is underway, will experience a second peak once measures are relaxed." By June 2021 this had not happened. China still has a death rate of just 3 per million (compared with the Uk's 1900 per million), and has now vaccinated over 800 million people without exposure to new variants.

Costello has been critical of the UK Government's response to the COVID-19 pandemic. On 16 April 2020, he told The Telegraph:

We should have introduced the lockdown two or three weeks earlier but we didn't. It should be combined with testing, tracing and digital apps that have been used so successfully in South Korea.... It is a total mess and we have been wrong every stage of the way. We have to change our policy and at the moment I don't hear anything to suggest we are. They keep talking about flattening the curve which implies they are seeking herd immunity but what we should have done is crushed the epidemic and then keep it down.

=== Awards ===
Costello holds fellowships of the Academy of Medical Sciences and of the Royal College of Physicians. He has also received Honorary Fellowships of the Royal College of Obstetricians and Gynaecologists, and of the Faculty of Public Health. In April 2011, Costello received the James Spence Medal, the highest honour of the Royal College of Paediatrics and Child Health, where he is a fellow. He serves on the Board of the global Partnership for Maternal, Newborn & Child Health, chaired by Graça Machel. In May 2016, he received the BMJ Lifetime Achievement Award.

== Personal life ==
Costello and his wife Helen have two sons and one daughter. He supports Millwall F.C., a team his family have supported since the 1890s. His cousin-in-law was Talk Talk lead singer Mark Hollis.
