= Sir Rickard Christophers Medal =

The Sir Rickard Christophers Medal, named in honour of Sir Rickard Christophers, is awarded every three years to individuals for their work in the field of tropical medicine and hygiene. The awarding body is the Royal Society of Tropical Medicine and Hygiene.

== Recipients ==
Source: RSTMH

Year	Recipient
1979	David Simpson
1982	Mick Gillies
1985	David Lewis
1988	George Nelson
1991	Robert Killick-Kendrick
1994	William Jopling & Dennis Ridley
1997	Michael Service
2000	Douglas Barker
2003	Andrew Davis
2006	Christopher Curtis
2009	Malcolm Molyneux
2012	Mike English
2015	Alan Fenwick
2018	Bridget Wills
2021	Liz Corbett

== See also ==
- List of medicine awards
- List of prizes named after people
