= Ralph Lainson =

- Born: 21 February 1927; Upper Beeding, West Sussex
- Died: 5 May 2015 (aged 88)
- Citizenship: United Kingdom
- Education: Steyning Grammar School
- Alma mater: London University
- Awards: OBE; Chalmers Medal (1971); Manson Medal (1983)
- Scientific career
- Fields: parasitologist
- Institutions: Instituto Evandro Chagas

Ralph Lainson (21 February 1927 – 5 May 2015) was a British parasitologist who studied leishmaniasis in Brazil. He was the first to publish a record of Chagas disease.

== Life ==
Lainson was born in Upper Beeding, Sussex on 21 February 1927. His father, Charles Harry Lainson was a chemist for Portland Cement and his mother was Annie May née Denyer. He studied at Steyning Grammar School, before enlisting in the army for a short while.

Upon leaving the army, Lainson studied at Brighton Technical College before studying at London University earning a BSc in 1951, a PhD in 1955, and a DSc in 1964. He was a lecturer in the London School of Hygiene and Tropical Medicine from 1955 to 1959.

Lainson established the Wellcome Trust Parasitology Unit, in the Instituto Evandro Chagas, Belém, Brazil, in 1965 and directed it until the unit was closed in 1992. Under his direction, the unit focussed on parasitic diseases, especially, leishmaniasis. In 1969, Lainson recorded Chagas' disease for the first time, and in 1979, he proposed a classification system for different leishmania species. He was awarded the Chalmers Medal (1971) and the Manson Medal (1983) by the Royal Society of Tropical Medicine and Hygiene. He was elected a Fellow of the Royal Society in 1982 and awarded the OBE in the 1996 Birthday Honours.

Lainson married twice, on 28 September 1957 to Ann Patricia Russell (they had three children together) and then in 1974 to Zeá Constante Lins. Lainson died on 5 May 2015 at the age of 88 at Hospital Beneficente Portuguesa.

== Works ==
- Flebotomíneos do Brasil , Editora Fiocruz, 2003
