= University of Ghana Teaching Hospital =

University Teaching Hospital
- Ministry of Health

Geography
- Location: Legon, Accra Ghana, Greater Accra Region, Ghana

Organisation
- Care system: Public - Ghana Health Service
- Type: Teaching
- Affiliated university: University of Ghana

Services
- Emergency department: Yes
- Beds: 617

Links
- Lists: Hospitals in Ghana

The University of Ghana Teaching Hospital is a 617-bed medical facility on the University of Ghana campus in Accra in the Greater Accra Region.

== History ==
The hospital was started with loan facility from the Israeli Government. The project will cost $217 million.
