= International Health (journal) =

- Discipline: Public health
- Language: English

Publication details
- History: 2009-present
- Publisher: Oxford University Press
- Frequency: Quarterly
- Open access: Hybrid
- Impact factor: 1.797 (2018)

Standard abbreviations
- ISO 4: Int. Health

Indexing
- ISSN: 1876-3413 (print); 1876-3405 (web)
- LCCN: 2010243140
- OCLC no.: 500479272

Links
- Journal homepage; Online access; Online archive

International Health is a quarterly peer-reviewed public health journal covering all areas of global health. It was established in 2009 and is published by Oxford University Press on behalf of the Royal Society of Tropical Medicine and Hygiene. The editor-in-chief is Professor David Molyneux. According to the Journal Citation Reports, the journal has a 2018 impact factor of 1.797.
