= Stephen Lawn =

Steve Lawn
- Stephen D. Lawn
- Born: Stephen David Lawn; 13 March 1966; York, England
- Died: 23 September 2016 (aged 50); London, England
- Education: University of Nottingham
- Known for: Tuberculosis and HIV research
- Spouse: Joy Lawn
- Awards: Chalmers Medal (2012)
- Scientific career
- Fields: Medicine; Tuberculosis; HIV
- Workplaces: University of Cape Town; London School of Hygiene & Tropical Medicine; Kwame Nkrumah University of Science and Technology

Stephen David Lawn (13 March 1966 – 23 September 2016) was a Professor of Infectious diseases and Tropical medicine known for research on tuberculosis and HIV/AIDS.

== Personal life ==
Lawn was married to Professor Joy Lawn. They have a son, Tim, and a daughter, Joanna.
