= St Matthew Academy =

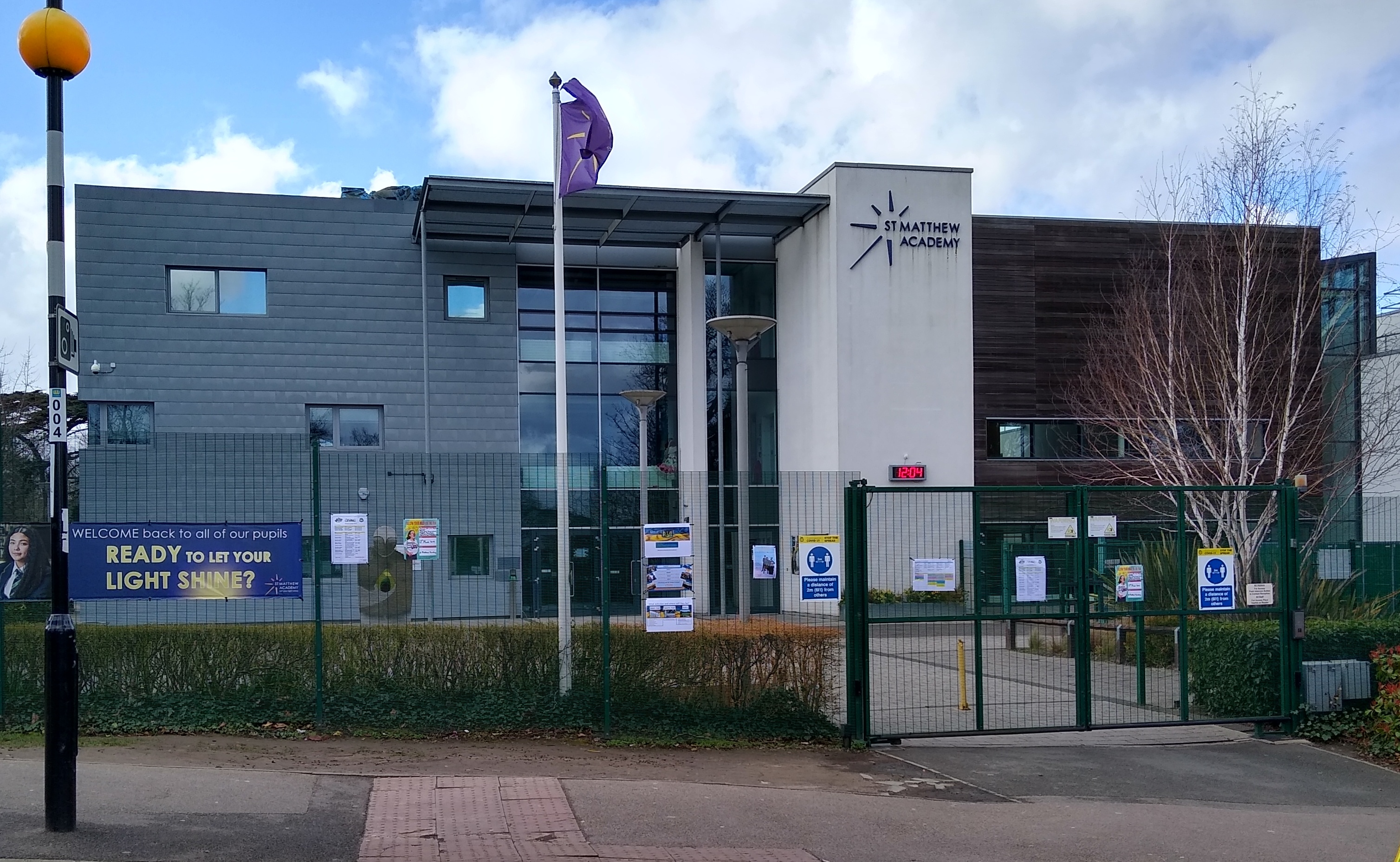

Location
- St Joseph's Vale, Blackheath; Blackheath, SE3 0XX; United Kingdom; 51.464°N 0°E

Information
- Type: Academy
- Motto: Let Your Light Shine
- Religious affiliation: Roman Catholic
- Established: September 2007; 18 years ago
- Department for Education URN: 135264 Tables
- Ofsted: Reports
- Head teacher: James Potter
- Gender: Coeducational
- Campus size: 10 acres (40,000 m^{2})
- Houses: Mandela, Romero, Teresa
- Colours: Blue and Gold
- Affiliations: St Benedict’s Catholic Trust
- Website: www.stmatthewacademy.co.uk

St Matthew Academy is a mixed all-through, co-educational Roman Catholic academy for students aged 4 to 16. Located in the London Borough of Lewisham, the academy opened in September 2007, replacing two previous schools: St Joseph's Academy and Our Lady of Lourdes primary school.

In March 2025, Ofsted described the school as 'Outstanding' in five areas: Effectiveness of Leadership and Management, Personal Development, Behaviour and Welfare and Early Years Provision. In 2015, The Inspection 48 Report rated the school as 'Good'.

The Academy motto: 'Let Your Light Shine' is taken from St Matthew's Gospel and captures the academy's strong Catholic values. The aim is to ensure that the talents and strengths of every young person is nurtured, encouraged, developed and celebrated.

The Academy had a new build budget of £38 million and is directly funded by the DCSF and receives additional support from its sponsors, the Roman Catholic Archdiocese of Southwark and the De La Salle Congregation.

The Academy is the first Roman Catholic all through Academy's from Reception to Year 11 and was formerly a specialist college in Business and Enterprise under the Specialist School's Trust.

== History ==
St Matthew Academy opened in 2007, replacing two previous schools, St Joseph's Academy secondary school and Our Lady of Lourdes primary school. The new Academy was built as a completely new school at a cost of £38 million budget. The Academy has developed from an all-boy Roman Catholic Academy, built in 1860, to a co-educational academy, accepting pupils aged 4–16. In 2017, the academy nursery closed.

The school's original principal, Monica Cross, was followed on her retirement in 2012 by Michael Barry, who in turn was succeeded in 2016 by head teacher Miranda Baldwin, and later James Potter

== Primary phase ==
Pupils are admitted at St Matthew Academy from the age of 4. St Matthew Academy Primary is directed by Head of Primary, Joanna Chick and teaches mainly through the International Primary Curriculum, it has specific learning goals for every subject, which meets the statutory requirements of the Early Years Foundation Stage Guidance and the Programmes of Study from the National Curriculum in Key Stage One and Key Stage Two. The primary school benefits from the secondary school facilities, including dedicated learning suites and subject leader specialists. Situated on the same grounds as St Matthew Academy, there are 2 classes in each year group.

== Secondary phase ==
In Key Stage 3, all students study National Curriculum subjects, complemented by a technology and creative arts carousel, delivered in specialised classrooms with dedicated resources and equipment. Students are offered a choice of extra subjects at KS4 that will form their individual GCSE curriculum. The secondary phase currently has 750 students, 6 classes in each year group with a generous ratio of staff. Form classes in the school (exc. Year 11) are based on the houses Romero, Teresa and Mandela.

== Post-16 ==
St Matthew Academy does not have a sixth form attached to the secondary school; however, it maintains strong links with neighbouring Catholic Sixth Form providers, Christ the King Sixth Form, Sacred Heart Sixth Form and St Thomas the Apostle College Sixth Form (STAC).
