= Malawi Medical Journal =

- Discipline: Medicine
- Language: English
- Edited by: Professor Adamson Muula

Publication details
- Former name: Medical Quarterly
- History: 1979-present
- Publisher: University of Malawi (Malawi)
- Frequency: Quarterly
- Open access: Yes
- Impact factor: 1.123 (2017)

Standard abbreviations
- ISO 4: Malawi Med. J.

Indexing
- ISSN: 1995-7262 (print); 1995-7270 (web)
- OCLC no.: 854908505

Links
- Journal homepage; Online archive

The Malawi Medical Journal (MMJ) is a quarterly open-access, peer-reviewed general medical journal published by the University of Malawi College of Medicine in collaboration with the Medical Association of Malawi. It was founded in 1979 as Medical Quarterly and relaunched under its current name in 1991. The journal focuses on clinical medicine, public health, and health policy relevant to Malawi and the wider sub-Saharan African region. Its current editor-in-chief is Professor Adamson Muula. According to the Journal Citation Reports, it had an impact factor of 1.123 in 2017.

== History ==
The Malawi Medical Journal was first published in 1979 under the title Medical Quarterly. It was relaunched in 1991 with its current name to better reflect its national scope. Originally printed locally, the journal transitioned to an online open-access model in the early 2000s, increasing its international readership and accessibility.

== Scope and Focus ==
The journal publishes peer-reviewed articles covering clinical medicine, public health, and health policy, with particular emphasis on issues relevant to sub-Saharan Africa. Common topics include infectious disease control, maternal and child health, epidemiology, and healthcare delivery systems.

== Abstracting and Indexing ==
The Malawi Medical Journal is indexed in PubMed, Scopus, African Journals Online (AJOL), and the Directory of Open Access Journals (DOAJ). It is ranked under “Public, Environmental, and Occupational Health” in the Journal Citation Reports.

== Editorial and Publication ==
The journal is published quarterly by the University of Malawi College of Medicine in collaboration with the Medical Association of Malawi. Its editor-in-chief is Professor Adamson Muula, a public health specialist at the University of Malawi.

== Open Access and Licensing ==
The Malawi Medical Journal is fully open access under the Creative Commons Attribution License (CC BY 4.0), allowing unrestricted reuse with proper attribution.
