= Jimmy Whitworth =

Jimmy Whitworth (born September 1955) is professor of international public health at the London School of Hygiene & Tropical Medicine. He was elected a Fellow of the Academy of Medical Sciences in 2010.
