= Cherno Samba =

Gambian footballer

Personal information
- Full name: Cherno Samba
- Date of birth: 10 January 1985 (age 41)
- Place of birth: Banjul, Gambia
- Height: 1.78 m (5 ft 10 in)
- Position: Forward

Youth career
- 2000–2002: Millwall

Senior career*
Years	Team	Apps	(Gls)
2002–2004	Millwall	0	(0)
2004–2006	Cádiz	0	(0)
2005–2006	→ Málaga B (loan)	4	(0)
2006–2008	Plymouth Argyle	13	(1)
2007	→ Wrexham (loan)	3	(0)
2008–2009	Haka	7	(0)
2010	Panetolikos	0	(0)
2012	Tønsberg	11	(3)
Total		52	(4)

International career
2000–2001	England U16	13	(0)
2002	England U17	1	(0)
2002–2003	England U18	4	(0)
2003	England U19	3	(0)
2005	England U20	1	(0)
2008–2010	Gambia	4	(1)
- * Club domestic league appearances and goals

Cherno Samba (born 10 January 1985) is a former professional footballer who played as a forward.

He represented England at every youth level up to the under-20 team, having moved to England at an early age. He earned full caps for Gambia between 2008 and 2010.

Samba began his career with Millwall before moving to Spain to join Cádiz. He spent time on loan with Malaga B before returning to England to play for Plymouth Argyle. He played on loan for Wrexham and then played Haka in Finland and Panetolikos in Greece before moving to Tønsberg in Norway.

== Early life ==
Samba was born in Banjul, Gambia. His father was a goalkeeper for the Gambian national team and his family moved to Watford, England when he was six, and then to Peckham, South London and was educated at the St Joseph's Academy, Blackheath.

== Club career ==
Samba came to prominence when as a 13-year-old, he scored 132 goals in 32 games for the St Joseph's Academy, Blackheath football team.

He started his career at Millwall. His prolific form continued, and he was allowed to talk to other clubs by Millwall – both Manchester United and Liverpool showed interest, however Millwall turned down a Liverpool offer of £2 million. In return, Millwall agreed a contract, whereby he was guaranteed three-years of football at senior team level, on him signing full school boy forms.

In the summer of 2004, he joined Spanish club Cádiz, and was then loaned out for season 2005–06 to Málaga B and Úbeda.

He returned to English football after Ian Holloway signed him for free on 31 August 2006 for Championship club Plymouth Argyle, on a two-year contract. Samba made his Football League debut on 30 September as a 74th-minute substitute for Reuben Reid at the Ricoh Arena against Coventry City, and within eight minutes he scored his first League goal in a 1–0 win for Argyle, heading in a cross from fellow replacement Hasney Aljofree.

On 29 January 2007, he joined League Two club Wrexham on loan for a month, with the option to extend to the end of the season. Samba returned to Plymouth on 26 February.

On 8 August 2008, Samba signed an 18-month contract with Finnish side Haka.

In 2009, he returned to England and went on trial with various English clubs including Norwich City and Portsmouth. He signed a two-year contract with Greek Second Division club Panetolikos in February 2010.

On 26 July 2011, he joined English Conference National side Forest Green Rovers on trial for a game against Bristol City. He however failed to earn himself a contract. He then joined another Conference club on trial, Alfreton Town.

In October 2011, he was on trial at Mansfield Town.

On 23 March 2012, Samba joined FK Tønsberg in the Norwegian Second Division.

On 20 July 2015, Samba announced his retirement from football, due to injury.

== International career ==
Samba represented England at every youth level up to under-20 and later decided that he wanted to play for Gambia.

In August 2008, he was called up to the Gambia squad for the 2010 World Cup qualifying match against Liberia and on 6 September 2008, he made his first appearance for Gambia as he played the final minutes of the match. He scored his first goal for the Scorpions in a friendly against Tunisia on 9 January 2010 when he headed in a Sanna Nyassi cross to open the scoring. The goal was made all the more special for Samba as it came on the eve of his 25th birthday. His last international appearance was against Mexico in June 2010. Samba was named in Gambia's squad for the 2012 Africa Cup of Nations qualifiers, but chose not to participate.

=== International goal ===
International goals by date, venue, opponent, score, result and competition
No.	Date	Venue	Cap	Opponent	Score	Result	Competition
1	9 January 2010	Stade El Menzah, Tunis, Tunisia	3	Tunisia	1–0	2–1	Friendly

== Personal life ==
Samba released an autobiography, Cherno Samba – Still in the Game, in 2018.

In 2018 he spoke out about his mental health, disclosing that he had suffered as a young player from depression, and had attempted to take his own life whilst playing in Spain.

The Gambia football school, 'Cherno Samba Academy of Football', from which the professional team Samger FC was created, is named after him.

== In popular culture ==
Samba was well known among players of the video game Championship Manager, due to the fact that he became an incredibly good player further down the line in the game, despite his relatively cheap price tag; this turned him into something of a cult hero amongst fans of the game. In a 2025 interview with The Telegraph, he revealed that with his character at striker, he managed Cheltenham Town from League Two to the Champions League in the game. He has also explained that his mobile phone provider once cut the delivery time from 2–3 months to next-day delivery on learning that he was serving Samba.
