= Victoria Nakibuuka =

Ugandan neonatologist and paediatrician

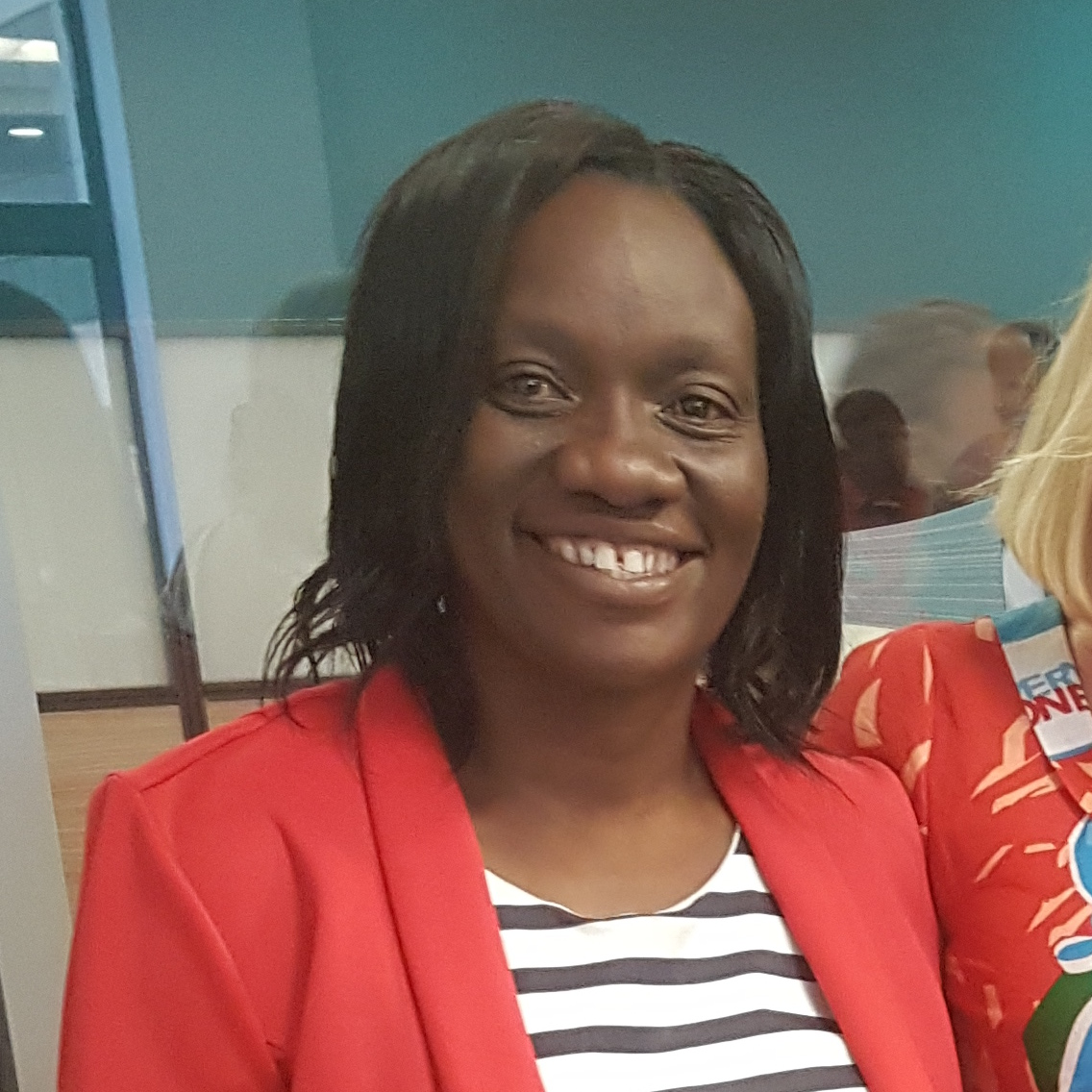
- Citizenship: Ugandan
- Education: Nakasero Primary School, Nabisunsa Girls High School, Mbarara University of Science and Technology, University of Cape Town
- Occupation: Doctor
- Employer(s): Nsambya Hospital in Kampala, Uganda

Victoria Nakibuuka is a Ugandan neonatologist and a paediatrician who works at Nsambya Hospital in Kampala, Uganda. She is head of department of neonates at Nsambya Hospital. She is also member of the national newborn steering committee and national maternal and perinatal review committee. She pioneered perinatal death audits at Nsambya hospital which was later scaled up in the whole country and setting up one of the first neonatal intensive care units in Uganda.

== Background and education ==
Nakibuuka went to Nakasero Primary School for her primary education and later joined Nabisunsa Girls High School for her secondary education. She joined Mbarara University of Science and Technology where she pursued her bachelor's degree in medicine. She attained her Masters in neonatal care from University of Cape Town, South Africa.

== Career ==
Nakibuuka returned to Uganda and worked with Nsambya hospital administration to remodel the neonatal infrastructure where she lobbied the hospital administration to buy more equipment and increase the number of health workers in the neonatal unit which reduced child mortality from 10 per cent to 4 per cent according to their statistics. She teamed up with other health professionals and introduced the use of breastmilk among preterm babies, who were less than 1.5 kg.

== Research ==
In 2018, Nakibuuka Mamuda Aminu, Nynke van den Broek, Pius Okong, Juan Emmanuel Dewez and Romano Byaruhanga had study named Prospective study to Explore changes in quality of care and perinatal outcomes after implementation of perinatal death audit in Uganda and this journal was published that in July 2020.

In 2019, Nakibuuka and several other authors published another a journal named Facility readiness in low and middle-income countries to address care of high risk/ small and sick newborns.
