= Brian Duke =

British tropical disease expert

Brian Oliver Lyndhurst Duke CBE M.D., ScD (24 June 1926 in Kampala, Uganda – 3 June 2006) was an expert in tropical diseases who extensively studied River Blindness and other parasitic diseases. His work helped to develop an anti parasitic drug to combat them.

== Career ==
Duke attended Gonville and Caius College, Cambridge and later Guy's Hospital, in all he attained an MD, MA, ScD, MB, BChir and a diploma in Tropical medicine.

He joined the Colonial Medical Service in 1953 and was dispatched to the Cameroons where he started to do in-depth studies of the dynamics of River Blindness. He also conducted research into the parasitical infections Loa loa and Schistosomiasis. He wrote 172 medical papers and his research set new standards in methodology for all future clinical trials. In 1975 Duke joined WHO as head of Filariasis infectious unit, his earlier research enabling the clinical trials of Ivermectin to go smoothly. This anti-parasitic drug proved very effective against River Blindness and other diseases caused by parasitic worms. Duke is also credited with pressuring Merck to supply Invermectin free to all sufferers of River Blindness, which led to the creation of the Mectizan Donation Programme. To date more than half a billion doses have been given away.

=== Honours and retirement ===
In 1961 Duke was appointed an OBE, followed by a CBE in 1975.
In 1991 Duke retired from WHO and became the medical director of the River Blindness Foundation until 1996. He was a distinguished scientist at the Armed Forces Institute of Pathology (AFIP) where he developed invaluable teaching materials on Helminithic Diseases. He worked closely with Aileen Marty in developing various infectious disease conferences and in identifying unusual effects caused in the female Onchocerca by Ivermectin.
