= Simon I. Hay =

British epidemiologist

Simon Iain Hay
- Born: 15 January 1971 (age 55); Rinteln, Germany
- Education: University of Bristol; Green College, Oxford
- Awards: Scientific Medal (2008); Back Award (2012); Bailey K. Ashford Medal (2013); Chalmers Medal (2015)
- Scientific career
- Fields: Epidemiology; Cartography
- Workplaces: University of Oxford; University of Washington
- Thesis: An investigation of the utility of remote sensing imagery for predicting the distribution and abundance of the tsetse fly (Diptera: Glossinidae) (1996)
- Website: simonihay.com

Simon Iain Hay (born 15 January 1971, Rinteln, Germany) is a British epidemiologist. He is Professor for Global Health at the University of Washington and Director of Geospatial Science at the Institute for Health Metrics and Evaluation (IHME). From 2013–2015 he served as the 52nd President of the Royal Society of Tropical Medicine and Hygiene.

== Education and career ==
Hay attended the University of Bristol, where he studied zoology (B.Sc. 1993, summa cum laude). He matriculated at the University of Oxford in the same year and gained his doctorate in epidemiology (D.Phil., 1996) while at Green College, Oxford. Early influences during his doctoral studies were Sir Richard Doll and Sir Richard Southwood. Hay has remained at the University of Oxford where he is now a member of congregation and was awarded the title of Reader (2008) and then Professor (2012). In 2012 he also became a Research Fellow in the Sciences and Mathematics at St John's College, Oxford where he gained a higher doctorate (D.Sc., 2014). In 2015, he became Professor for Health at the University of Washington and Director of the Local Burden of Disease at the Institute for Health Metrics and Evaluation (IHME).

The Lancet Infectious Diseases published a biographical sketch, Simon Hay: mapping the world's ills summarising Hay's education, early career and influences. His work on mapping malaria and other vector-borne diseases, and more recently adding a geospatial dimension to the Global Burden of Disease Study (GBD), is described. Hay's future goal is to create high spatial resolution maps for all the diseases, risks, and injuries covered by the GBD, which could be possible in the next 10 years with advances in technology. Influential colleagues in the field, Peter Hotez and Jeremy Farrar acknowledge Prof. Hay's geospatial vision in presenting complex data sets in an accessible way that has led to policy changes worldwide.

Kofi Annan recognised the importance of Hay's recent work in his article, saying, “Such fine-grained insight brings tremendous responsibility to act.” Published in Nature (journal), these high-resolution maps of child growth failure (stunted growth, wasting and underweight), and educational attainment, clearly illustrate local progress made during the Millennium Development Goal era, as well as, some entrenched inequalities across the continent, that need significant attention in the Sustainable Development Goal era. As well as working on these Nature (journal) papers, Hay's Local Burden of Disease (LBD) team explores health trends at a high spatial resolution to provide information to local decision-makers.

== Research ==
Hay investigates spatial and temporal aspects of infectious disease epidemiology to support the more rational implementation of disease control and intervention strategies.

== Honours and awards ==
Hay was awarded the Scientific Medal of the Zoological Society of London (2008), the Back Award of the Royal Geographical Society (2012), for research contributing to public health policy, the Bailey K. Ashford Medal of the American Society of Tropical Medicine and Hygiene (2013) and the Chalmers Medal of the Royal Society of Tropical Medicine and Hygiene (2015), both for exceptional contributions to tropical medicine. He was elected a Fellow of the Academy of Medical Sciences in 2015.
