= British Society for Parasitology =

The British Society for Parasitology is a UK-based organisation of British parasitologists. It was founded in April 1962 from the Parasitological Section of the Institute of Biology. The initial goals of the society were to hold two meetings yearly: a residential meeting in the spring, and a specialist symposium in the autumn. As of 2012, the society has over 1500 members, about a third of whom are from overseas locations. The society is affiliated to the Royal Society of Biology
