= Royal Society of Tropical Medicine and Hygiene =

British learned society

- Established: 1907; 119 years ago
- Founder: James Cantlie; George Carmichael Low
- Headquarters: London, England
- President: Prof. Gail Davey

The Royal Society of Tropical Medicine and Hygiene, more commonly known by its acronym RSTMH, was founded in 1907 by Sir James Cantlie and George Carmichael Low. Sir Patrick Manson, the Society's first President (1907–1909), was recognised as "the father of tropical medicine" by his biographer. He passed the post on to Sir Ronald Ross (president 1909–1911), discoverer of the role of mosquitoes in the transmission of malaria.

The objectives of RSTMH are "to promote and advance the study, control and prevention of diseases in man and other animals in the tropics and sub-tropics, facilitate discussion and exchange of information among those who are interested in tropical diseases and international health, and generally to promote the work of those interested in these objectives".

In 1920, King George V gave his permission for RSTMH to use the Royal prefix. Queen Elizabeth II was patron of the society and the Princess Royal is an Honorary Fellow.

== Location ==
In 2011 the Society moved from Manson House, 26 Portland Place, London, to its current premises in Northumberland House, 303-306 High Holborn, London, WC1V 7JZ

== Journals ==
RSTMH publishes two peer reviewed journals, Transactions of the Royal Society of Tropical Medicine and Hygiene and International Health.

== Awards and medals ==
RSTMH awards the Chalmers Medal and Donald Mackay Medal annually and the Manson Medal, the George Macdonald Medal and the Sir Rickard Christophers Medal triennially.

Five special Centenary Medals were awarded in 1907, two for lifetime achievement and three for special achievement by an under-45 year old.

== Presidents ==
A complete list of presidents and their inaugural presidential addresses can be found on the Transactions website.

- 2020 - onwards Prof. Gail Davey
- 2019-2020 Prof. Sarah Rowland-Jones
- 2016–2019 Simon Cathcart
- 2013-2016 Prof. Simon I. Hay
- 2011-2013 Prof. Peter Winstanley
- 2009-2011 Prof. Hazel M. Dockrell
- 2007–2009 Prof. David H. Molyneux
- 2005–2007 Sir Brian M. Greenwood
- 2003–2005 Prof. Andrew Tomkins
- 2001–2003 Prof. Harold Townson
- 1999–2001 Prof. David Bradley
- 1997–1999 Prof. David A. Warrell
- 1995-1997 Major-General George O. Cowan
- 1993–1995 Prof. Gordon C. Cook
- 1991-1993 Dr Peter O. Williams
- 1989–1991 Prof. George S. Nelson
- 1987-1989 Prof. Wallace Peters
- 1985-1987 Prof. Herbert M. Gilles
- 1983-1985 Sir Ian A. McGregor
- 1981–1983 Dr Antony J. Duggan
- 1979–1981 Dr Leonard G. Goodwin
- 1977–1979 Dr Stanley G. Browne
- 1975-1977 Dr C.E. Gordon Smith
- 1973–1975 Prof. Alan W. Woodruff
- 1971-1973 Sir Robert Drew
- 1969-1971 Prof. Brian Maegraith
- 1967–1969 Prof. Percy Cyril Garnham
- 1965-1967 Prof. George MacDonald
- 1963-1965 Dr Charles Wilcocks
- 1961–1963 Sir George McRobert
- 1959-1961 Sir William MacArthur
- 1957-1959 Sir John S. K. Boyd
- 1955-1957 Prof. Rupert M. Gordon
- 1953-1955 Dr F. Norman White
- 1951–1953 Sir Neil Hamilton Fairley
- 1949-1951 Prof. Henry Edward Shortt
- 1947–1949 Sir Philip H. Manson-Bahr
- 1945-1947 Dr C. Morley Wenyon
- 1943–1945 Sir Henry Harold Scott
- 1939–1943 Sir S. Rickard Christophers
- 1937-1939 Dr Sydney Price James
- 1935–1937 Sir Arthur Bagshawe
- 1933–1935 Sir Leonard Rogers
- 1929–1933 Sir George Carmichael Low
- 1927–1929 Prof. John William Watson Stephens
- 1925-1927 Sir Andrew Balfour
- 1923-1925 Sir Percy W. Bassett-Smith
- 1921-1923 Sir James Cantlie
- 1919–1921 Sir William John Ritchie Simpson
- 1917-1919 Sir David Bruce
- 1915-1917 Dr Fleming M. Sandwith
- 1913-1915 Sir R. Havelock Charles
- 1911–1913 Sir William Boog Leishman
- 1909–1911 Sir Ronald Ross
- 1907–1909 Sir Patrick Manson
