= List of The Darling Foundation Prize recipients =

This is a list of recipients of the Darling Foundation Prize awarded by League of Nations until 1948 and after by World Health Organization (WHO).

The Darling Foundation was established in 1929 in honour of eminent malaria expert Samuel Taylor Darling, who died while participating in a study expedition for the League of Nations' Malaria Commission. In 1948, WHO acquired control of the Foundation. A bronze medal and a fixed amount of 2500 CHF make up the Darling Foundation Prize, which is given for exceptional work in the pathology, aetiology, epidemiology, treatment, prevention, or control of malaria. It was discontinued in 2000.

== List of recipients ==
Year	Picture	Name	Country
1932		Sydney Price James	UK
1936		Nicolaas Swellengrebel (Note: Awarded in 1938)	Netherlands
1951		Henry Edward Shortt	UK
1951		Cyril Garnham	UK
1954		George Robert Coatney	US
1954		George MacDonald	UK
1957		Paul F. Russell	US
1959		Emilio J. Pampana	Italy
1960		Gordon Covell	UK
1960		Arnoldo Gabaldón	Venezuela
1963		Martin Dunaway Young	US
1964		Monowar Khan Afridi	Pakistan
1966		Mihai Ciucă	Romania
1966		Pyotr Grigorievich Sergiev	USSR
1968		G. Giglioli	Italy
1968		Jaswant Singh	India
1971		Leonard Jan Bruce-Chwatt	UK
1971		Augusto Corradetti	Italy
1974	Ian McGregor	Ian McGregor (malariologist)	UK
1974		Amar Prasad Ray	India
1980		Mohyeddin Ahmad Farid	Egypt
1980		William Trager	US
1986		Robert H. Black	Australia
1986		David Francis Clyde	US
1990		Herbert Michael Gilles	UK
1990		S. Pattanayak	India
1999		Agostinho Cruz Marques	Brazil
1999		Vinod Prakash Sharma	India
