= David Warrell =

British physician

Sir David Warrell KCMG FMedSci FRCP FRCPE DTM&H FZS
- Born: October 1939 (age 86–87); Singapore
- Education: Portsmouth Grammar School Christ Church, Oxford (MA BM BCh DM DSc)
- Spouse: Mary J Prentice (m. 1975)
- Awards: KCMG, Companion of The Most Exalted Order of The White Elephant (Thailand)

Sir David Alan Warrell (born 6 October 1939) is an English physician, clinical researcher, and teacher, specialising in Tropical Medicine.^{,} He is currently emeritus Professor of Tropical Medicine and Honorary Fellow of St Cross College, University of Oxford. He was Founding Director of the highly successful Wellcome-Mahidol University, Oxford Tropical Medicine Research Programme, Thailand (1979-), and Oxford Centre for Tropical Medicine (2001-), and was Head of the Nuffield Department of Clinical Medicine (2002–2004).

== Biography ==
=== Early life and education ===
Born in Singapore, Warrell was educated at Portsmouth Grammar School, and studied medicine in Oxford (Christ Church), and London (St Thomas’ Hospital and Royal Postgraduate Medical Schools).

=== Career and research ===
Warrell enjoys an international reputation for his clinical research on tropical diseases, carried out since 1968 in Africa, South and South-East Asia, Oceania, and Latin America. His principal mentors were Moran Campbell, Eldryd Parry, Herbert Gilles, Alistair Reid and David Weatherall. He is a pioneer investigator in the field of snakebite envenoming, helping to establish its importance as a public health problem in many countries, notably India, where snakes kill an average of 58,000 people each year, and to achieve its recognition as a Neglected Tropical Disease by WHO in 2016. Warrell's ground-breaking research introduced improvements in diagnosis, emphasising the importance of herpetology. It expanded understanding of underlying mechanisms of organ and tissue involvement, and improved treatment. He was the first to attempt randomised, controlled clinical trials of antivenom. After publicising, with David Theakston, the crisis in antivenom supply in Africa, he helped to develop new antivenoms for this region. His research on malaria focussed on the pathophysiology and treatment of severe Plasmodium falciparum infection, especially cerebral malaria, leading to the rejection of dexamethasone, a once-popular ancillary treatment that proved deleterious in a randomised, double-blind, placebo-controlled trial. He explored the pathophysiology of rabies encephalomyelitis, and, in research led by his wife Mary Warrell, a clinical virologist, he helped improve rabies post-exposure prophylaxis using economical vaccine regimens.

Warrell is also an internationally renowned physician, teacher and lecturer on tropical medicine, infectious diseases, and expedition/wilderness medicine, supporting famous explorers, and travellers. He was an editor and/or contributor to many British and American medical textbooks, notably The Oxford Textbook of Medicine. He continues involvement in research and advocacy, particularly directed at the global snakebite crisis, aiming to improve treatment and prevention strategies worldwide.

=== Honours and awards ===
Warrell was awarded the Sir Patrick Manson Medal (Royal Society of Tropical Medicine and Hygiene); Mary Kingsley Centenary Medal (Liverpool School of Tropical Medicine); Sir William Osler Memorial Medal (University of Oxford); The Queen's Anniversary Prize for Higher & Further Education (2000); and Redi Award (International Society on Toxinology (2012). He was a founding fellow of the Academy of Medical Sciences (FMedSci) in 1998.

In recognition of his research in Thailand, he was made a Companion of The Most Exalted Order of The White Elephant by King Bhumibol Adulyadej (2003). In the 2022 Queen's Birthday Honours he was appointed Knight Commander of the Order of St Michael and St George (KCMG) for services to global health research and clinical practice.

At the Royal College of Physicians, he delivered the Marc Daniels, Bradshaw, and Croonian Lectures, and Harveian Oration (2001), and served as International Director and Hans Sloane Fellow (2012–16). He was President of the International Federation for Tropical Medicine (1996–2000), and Royal Society of Tropical Medicine and Hygiene (1997–9); chairman of the UK Medical Research Council's AIDS Therapeutic Trials Committee (1987–93), and UK-China Ethics Committee (2006–8). He was a founding co-director of the Global Snakebite Initiative (2012-).
