= Pasteur Institute of Algeria =

Algerian-French disease research organization

Pasteur Institute of Algeria Institut Pasteur d'Algérie
- Founded: 1894; 132 years ago
- Founder: Jean Baptiste Paulin Trolard; Henri Soulié
- Type: Non-profit
- Purpose: Study biology, microorganisms, diseases and vaccines.
- Location: Algiers, Algeria
- Coordinates: 36°45′08″N 2°57′57″E
- Region served: Algeria
- Services: Research, Public health, Training, Innovation
- Official languages: French
- Key people: Fawzi Derrar (Director)
- Website: www.pasteur.dz

The Pasteur Institute of Algeria is an institute located in Algiers, Algeria. It is part of the Pasteur Institute's international network of health centres. Its library holds 47,000 volumes.

== Missions ==
The institute has the following missions: carrying out analyzes and diagnoses, it also ensures epidemiological surveillance, research, training, production and import and distribution of the main vaccines to health establishments and animal husbandry. laboratory animals that are the subject of experiments.

== Directors ==
- Jean Baptiste Paulin Trolard (1894 – 1900)
- Edmond Sergent (1900 – 1910)
- Albert Calmette (1910 – 1912)
- Edmond Sergent (1912 – 1962)
- Docteur Beguet (1962 – 1963)
- Robert Neil (1963 – 1971)
- Mostefa Benhassine (1971 – 1986)
- Amar Benaouda (1986 – 1989)
- Mohamed Chérif Abbadi (1989 – 1991)
- Fadila Boulahbal (1991 – 1995)
- Mohamed Tazir (1994 – 2000)
- Miloud Belkaid (2000 – 2006)
- Hadj Ahmed Lebres (2006 – 2009)
- Mohamed Chérif Abbadi (2009)
- Mohamed Tazir (2009 – 2012)
- Mohamed Mansouri (2012)
- Kamel Kezzal (2012 – 2016)
- Zoubir Harrat (2016 – 2020)
- Fawzi Derrar (2020 – present)
