= Alwen M. Evans =

British entomologist

Alwen Myfanwy Evans
- Born: 1895; Stockport, England
- Died: 1937 aged 42; Mossley Hill, Liverpool
- Education: University of Manchester
- Scientific career
- Workplaces: Liverpool School of Tropical Medicine
- Thesis: A Short Illustrated Guide to the Anophelines of Tropical and South Africa

Alwen Myfanwy Evans (1895–1937) was a British entomologist, specialising in tropical insects particularly the ecology and identification of Anopheles species.

== Education and personal life ==
Evans studied at University of Manchester and was awarded a Masters degree in entomology in 1918. She later returned to the University of Manchester for a doctoral study on mosquitos, which was awarded in 1928. She died of pneumonia in 1937.

== Career ==
Evans was appointed at the Liverpool School of Tropical Medicine in 1918. By 1921 she was promoted to a lecturer post in the Department of Entomology, becoming the first woman to join the department's academic staff. From 1926 she went on several expeditions to Africa during which she surveyed for mosquitoes and learnt how to identify new species. Places she visited included Freetown in Sierra Leone and also Kenya. This included 6 months in East Africa financed by the Leverhulme Trust in 1936.

She was awarded a D. Sc. degree from University of Manchester for her thesis about the ecology of Ethiopian Anopheles mosquitoes that was published in 1927.

She specialized in tropical insects, particularly mosquitoes from Africa that are the vectors of pathogens that cause diseases, such as malaria. Evans led efforts to describe and survey the distribution of mosquito species, and saw this as a starting point for work to control the diseases distributed by these insects. Her high-quality and skilled illustrations of the insects and their habitats continued to be used long after her death. Her most significant work, the second volume of The Mosquitoes of the Ethiopian Region 2: Anophelini; Adults and Early Stages provided a very detailed account of all aspects of Anopheles mosquitoes and was published posthumously in 1938. Shortly before her death she took the near complete manuscript and illustrations to Frederick Wallace Edwards at the Natural History Museum, London and he ensured the monograph was published after her death.

== Publications ==
Evans was the author or co-author of at least 37 scientific articles, books and notes. The most significant was her monograph, the second volume The Mosquitoes of the Ethiopian Region. In addition her illustrations continue to be re-used for instruction and education.

- Alwen M. Evans (1938) The Mosquitoes of the Ethiopian Region 2: Anophelini; Adults and Early Stages (London: British Museum (Natural History), pp 404.
- A. M. Evans and P. C. C. Garnham (1936) The funestus series of Anopheles at Kisumu and a coastal locality in Kenya. Ann Trop Med Parasitol 30 511–20.
- A. M. Evans (1934) Further notes on African anophelines, with a description of a new group of Myzomyia. Ann Trop Med Parasitol 28 549–70.
- W. S. Patton and A.M. Evans (1929) Insects, Ticks, Mites and Venomous Animals of Medical and Veterinary Importance. Part I: Medical and (1931) Part II: Public Health Liverpool School of Tropical Medicine. pp 740.
- Alwen M. Evans (1927) A short illustrated guide to the anophelines of tropical and South Africa Liverpool School of Tropical Medicine Memoir (New Series) No. 3, University Press of Liverpool, Liverpool
- R. Newstead and A. M. Evans (1922) A new tsetse-fly from the South Cameroons. Ann Trop Med Parasitol. 16 51–4.

== Legacy ==
The species Anopheles evansae from Argentina was named after her. The University of Liverpool holds her documents in its archives. Some of the insect specimens she collected are held in Liverpool World Museum’s collection of flies.
