= Innovative Vector Control Consortium =

International nonprofit organization

The Innovative Vector Control Consortium (IVCC) is a not-for-profit, product development partnership (PDP) designed to facilitate the development and delivery of new and improved vector control tools to prevent malaria and other neglected tropical diseases. Their mission is to save lives, protect health, and increase prosperity in areas where disease transmitted by insects is endemic.

== Formation and organisational structure ==
The Innovative Vector Control Consortium (IVCC) is a not-for-profit public-private partnership that was established in 2005. IVCC is registered as a charity in the UK. IVCC was founded in 2005, through a grant to the Liverpool School of Tropical Medicine (LSTM), by the Bill and Melinda Gates Foundation. IVCC was founded by LSTM Director and Professor Janet Hemingway.

Nick Hamon is the chief executive officer of IVCC. IVCC is headquartered in Liverpool, UK, but also has a registered office and staff in Washington, D.C., US, as well as staff based in several other countries. The strategy and scope of IVCC is directed by its core team under governance of the Board of Trustees who represent a wide range of expertise.

== Strategy ==
The IVCC vision is to save lives, protect health and increase prosperity in areas where disease transmitted by insects is endemic. The IVCC mission is to do this by building partnerships that create innovative solutions to prevent the transmission of insect-borne disease. IVCC facilitates the development and delivery of novel and improved vector control tools and solutions to combat the rapidly growing problem of insecticide resistance.

IVCC works with multiple stakeholders to develop and deliver novel public health vector control insecticides and tools to end-users to support the implementation of robust insecticide resistance management plans. This will enable national malaria control programs to access a variety of new vector control solutions.

Although primarily focused on malaria, IVCC recognizes that new tools and products can be effective against a wide range of other vector-borne diseases.

== Funding ==
IVCC was originally funded by the Bill and Melinda Gates Foundation with a grant of $50.7 million over five years, the Bill and Melinda Gates Foundation continues to fund IVCC today. IVCC is also principally funded by UKaid, USAID, Unitaid, The Swiss Agency for Development and Cooperation, The Global Fund and the Australian Government.

== Partners ==
IVCC has active partnerships with agrochemical companies, non-governmental organisations, governmental organisations, and academia. IVCC's primary industrial partners include BASF, Bayer, Mitsui, Sumitomo and Syngenta. Additional IVCC partners include Abt Associates, Imperial College London, The London School of Hygiene & Tropical Medicine, Liverpool School of Tropical Medicine, PATH, PMI, The Global Fund, Tagros, Vestergaard Fransden and Westham.

== Malaria eradication ==
IVCC fully supports the Bill and Melinda Gates Foundation's report 'From Aspiration to Action' which sets out a comprehensive and achievable strategy for malaria eradication by 2040. ZERO by 40 is an initiative that works side by side with other malaria-fighting organisations toward the goal of ending the disease for good by the year 2040. For its part, ZERO by 40 focuses on the prevention of malaria through vector control. Founding partners of the initiative include IVCC and key global Crop Protection companies BASF, Bayer, Mitsui, Sumitomo, and Syngenta, in conjunction with the Bill and Melinda Gates Foundation. ZERO by 40 is a collaborative effort to manage and optimise current resources and innovate new vector control tools to help eradicate malaria.

== Successes ==
IVCC has made great strides toward achieving its mission and has recorded many key accomplishments to date. A sample of these accomplishments include:

- Collaborated with BASF to repurpose Chlorfenapyr for malaria prevention. Treated Interceptor G2 nets received an interim recommendation from WHO in June 2017.
- Led a US$65.1 million initiative to support countries in obtaining the neonic clothianidin to spray walls in homes and fight growing insecticide resistance.
- From 2007-2017 evaluation of over 4.5 million compounds for potential use as public health insecticides leading to six classes of novel active ingredients identified for possible development. Of them 2 have been developed.
- Forged partnerships to establish African trial sites and new insectaries to provide industry-standard testing.
- Developed a diagnostic system for malarial insecticide resistance detection and implemented it within disease control programs in Africa.
- Launched two new long-lasting indoor residual spray formulations to expand the range of vector control tools for challenging malaria insecticide resistance.
- Delivery of disease data management system software to national control programs.
- Launched insecticide quantification kits to monitor spray program implementation.
- Facilitated the first African vector control field trial site to achieve good laboratory practice (GLP) certification. Six other African vector control field trial site facilities are expected to achieve GLP certification by the end of 2018.
