= Wendy Gibson =

British academic protozoologist

Wendy Gibson is Professor of Protozoology at University of Bristol, specialising in trypanosomes and molecular parasitology.

== Career ==
Wendy C. Gibson studied B. Sc. Zoology at University College London, UK graduating in 1975 followed by a doctorate at London School of Hygiene and Tropical Medicine that was awarded in 1979. She continued to work there with Wallace Peters for a short time after her doctorate. She was awarded DSc by the University of London in 1997.

In 1997 she was appointed as a member of academic staff at University of Bristol, UK and was later promoted to professor.

Her research on trypanosomes started during her PhD and included fieldwork in Liberia. She subsequently gained greater knowledge of African trypanosomiasis during four years at the Kenya Trypanosomiasis Research Institute. Later in her career she developed expertise in molecular biology technologies through spending two years at the Netherlands Cancer Institute collaborating with Piet Borst.

Gibson's career has focused on the parasites of the genus Trypanosoma, especially Trypanosoma brucei that causes the disease African trypanosomiasis in humans, otherwise known as sleeping sickness. She has applied a wide range of technologies for determining identification and diversity, including morphology, genetics, proteins, molecular biology and genomic data. To better understand the life of trypanosomes within its host insect vector, the tsetse fly, she developed methodology based on reporter genes for fluorescent proteins that allows trypanosomes to be visualised readily within the fly's cells using microscopy. Further development allowed details of genetic recombination during sexual reproduction of T. brucei within its tsetse fly host to be identified.

Gibson has also studied of the interactions of trypanosomes within domestic animals that result in disease. One of these was T. congolense where her methods using fluorescent protein markers allowed the details of its sexual reproduction to be identified. Other collaborations include with veterinary scientists about the presence of trypanosomes in pet dogs in Nigeria.

She was a member of the consortium that provided the first genome sequence of Trypanosoma brucei gambiense and T. grayi, a parasite of crocodiles.

She has participated in public discussions about parasites, including in the BBC Radio 4 programme In Our time in 2017.

Gibson was Vice President and then President of British Society for Protist Biology from 2006 until 2011.

== Publications ==
Gibson is the author or co-author of over 100 scientific publications and book chapters. These include:

- Peacock, Lori; Bailey, Mick; Carrington, Mark; Gibson, Wendy) (2014) Meiosis and Haploid Gametes in the Pathogen Trypanosoma brucei. Current Biology 24 181-186
- Jackson, Andrew P.; Sanders, Mandy); Berry, Andrew; McQuillan, Jacqueline; and 10 other authors including Gibson, Wendy; Barry, David; Berriman, Matthew); and Hertz-Fowler, Christiane (2010) The Genome Sequence of Trypanosoma brucei gambiense, Causative Agent of Chronic Human African Trypanosomiasis. PLOS Neglected Tropical Disease 4 Article Number e658
- Hamilton, Patrick B.; Gibson, Wendy C.; Stevens, Jamie R. (2007) Patterns of co-evolution between trypanosomes and their hosts deduced from ribosomal RNA and protein-coding gene phylogenies. Molecular Phylogenies and Evolution 44 15-25

== Awards ==
In 1995 Gibson was awarded the third Albert Dubois prize for Tropical Pathology from the Belgian Academy of Medicine for work on genetic exchange in trypanosomes.
