= Pyotr Sergiev =

Russian scientist and malariologist, worked with WHO (1893-1973)

- Пётр Сергиев
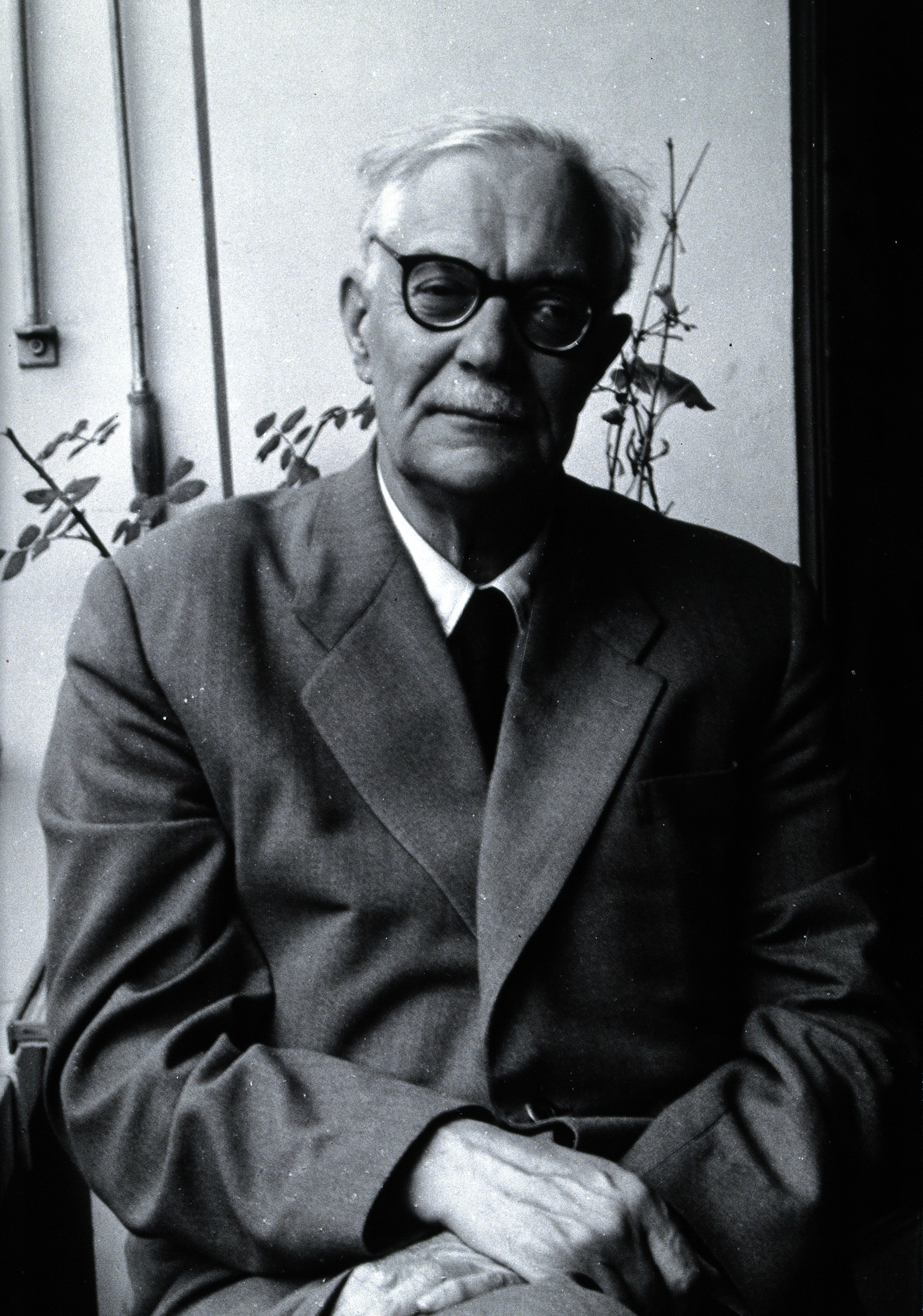
- Born: 10 July 1893; Sretenskoye village, Kotelnichsky Uyezd, Vyatka Governorate, Russian Empire
- Died: 12 July 1973 (aged 80); Moscow, Soviet Union
- Resting place: Novodevichy Cemetery, Moscow
- Education: Kazan Federal University
- Awards: Darling Foundation Prize (1966)
- Scientific career
- Fields: Malaria, epidemiology, parasitology, virology
- Institutions: First Moscow State Medical University

Pyotr Grigoryevich Sergiev (Russian: Пётр Григорьевич Сергиев; 10 July 1893 – 12 July 1973) was a Soviet parasitologist and epidemiologist, Fellow of the USSR Academy of Medical Sciences (1944), professor, public health organizer, malariologist working with World Health Organization. In addition, he was awarded the Hero of Socialist Labour and two Stalin Prizes.

== Early life and education ==
Pyotr Sergiev was born in the village of Sretenskoye in the Vyatka Governorate (today's the Kotelnichsky District of the Kirov Oblast), Russian Empire, to a local teacher. In 1917 he graduated from the medical faculty of Kazan Federal University and was sent to the army as a regimental doctor. After demobilization in 1918, he worked as an infectious disease specialist.

== Career and research ==
In 1919, he volunteered for the Red Army and became a member of the Communist Party of the Soviet Union (RKP(b)). In 1920, he headed the sanitary management of the Western Siberia District; he fought typhus in the challenging conditions during the Russian Civil War. Between 1921 and 1922, he was a doctor at the Russian Soviet Federative Socialist Republic (RSFSR) Embassy in Afghanistan.

During the Great Patriotic War, he was the head of the department for combating malaria of the People's Commissariat of Health of the USSR. Between 1922 and 192, Sergiev was a party functionary. Between 1927 and 1929, he worked at the Tropical Institute (now the E.I. Martsinovsky Institute of Medical Parasitology and Tropical Medicine) as a doctor, before being promoted to deputy director (1929–1934) and director (1934–1970). With Sergiev's assistance, the Akrikhin plant was built, which already in 1936 began to produce the Akrikhin drug, and the anti-malarial drug quinocide was also synthesized.

From 1936 to 1972, Sergiev was the editor-in-Chief of Medical Parasitology and Parasitic Diseases. He was also a member of the League of Nations’ Malaria Commission. At the same time, he held the People's Commissariat of Health of the RSFSR from 15 August 1937. He later became the head of the anti-epidemic department from 1938 until 1941. He was also the head of the Department for Combating malaria at the Commissariat. On 14 November 1944, Sergiev was elected a Fellow of the USSR Academy of Medical Sciences among its first members, becoming a member of the Presidium of the Parasitological Medicine Department of the Academy of Medical Sciences USSR (1946–1948).

The Soviet government paid great attention to the fight against malaria. On 29 May 1944, the Council of People's Commissars of the USSR adopted Decree No. 629, "On measures to eliminate malaria", the implementation of which led to a sharp decrease in the incidence of malaria. He contributed to the introduction of the aerial chemical method in the treatment of anophelogenic reservoirs. In 1952, Sergiev and a group of malariologists were awarded the Stalin Prize for developing a system of measures and putting them into practice on a national scale. By 1960, malaria had practically been eliminated in the USSR.

Sergiev became the USSR Academy of Medical Sciences' secretary (1953–1957), and Vice-President (1957–1960). At the same time, He was a lecturer at the Central Institute for Medical Training of Physicians and the First Moscow State Medical University.

He paid special attention to the training of parasitologists and entomologists. He gave lectures on the fight against malaria at the Central Institute for the Improvement of Doctors, a course in parasitology for students of the sanitary faculty of the First Moscow State Medical University. The Institute of Medical Parasitology and Tropical Medicine provided training in tropical parasitology for Soviet doctors travelling abroad to work. In 1966, he was awarded the international prize and the Darling medal for his services in the field of malariology.

His research on the epidemiology of malaria, the study of strains of pathogens, the testing and evaluation of the effectiveness of new anti-malarial drugs, the classification of foci of malaria and others were covered in the monograph by him and A.I. Yakusheva "Malaria and its control in the USSR" (1956).

From 1970 until the end of his life, Sergiev was a consultant at the Institute of Medical Parasitology and Tropical Medicine. Sergiev published over 200 scientific papers, mainly devoted to malaria research, which he studied for more than 45 years. Sergiev’s work (together with N.A. Tiburskaya) on the study of malaria parasites of various strains received worldwide recognition.

== Death ==
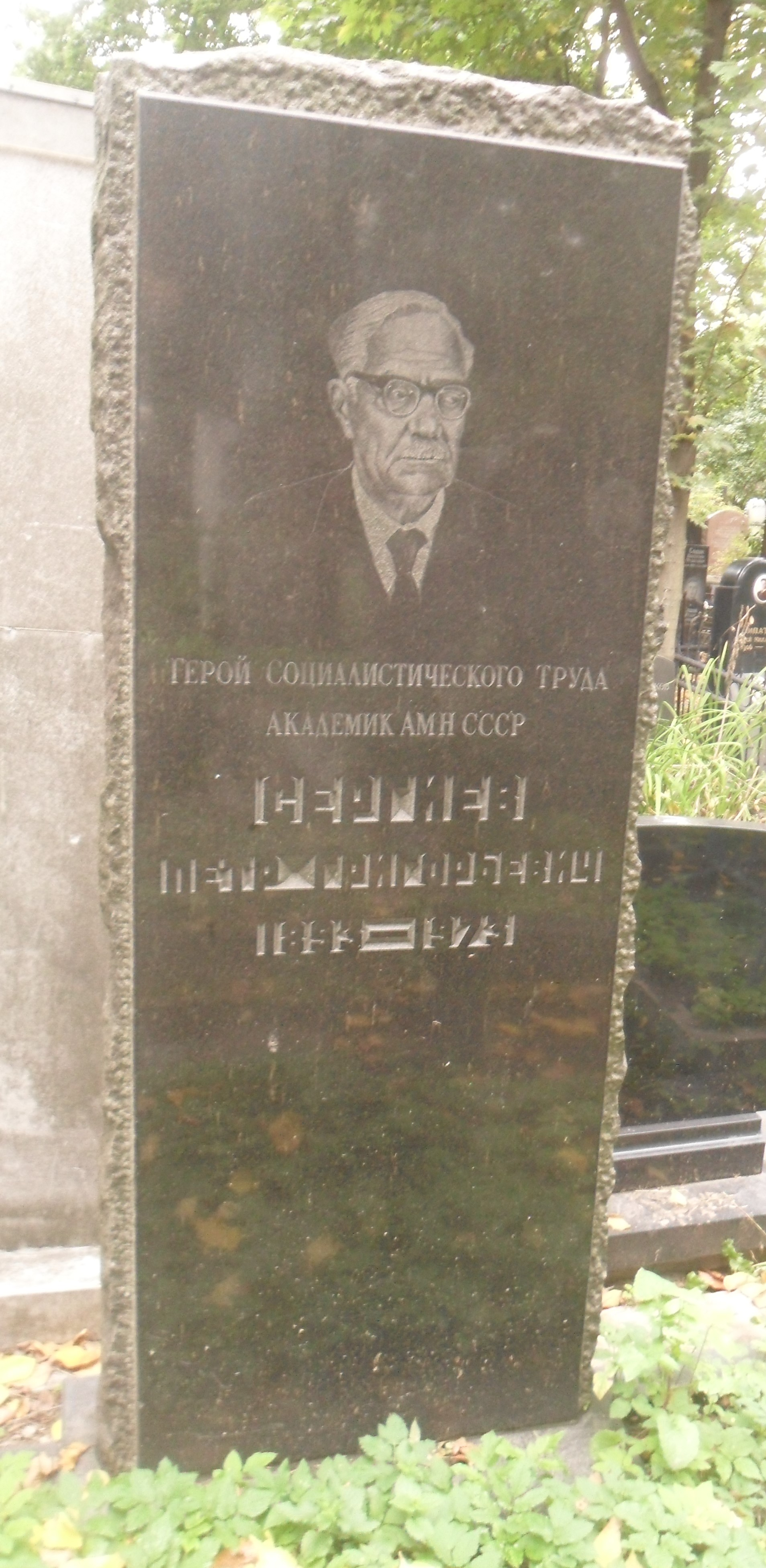
Sergiev's grave at the Novodevichy Cemetery in Moscow

Sergiev died on 12 July 1973, two days after his 80th birthday. He was buried at the Novodevichy Cemetery in Moscow. He was survived by his son Vladimir (born 1943), a parasitologist and Fellow of the Russian Academy of Sciences, and grandson Pyotr (born 1973), a molecular biologist and a Fellow of the Russian Academy of Sciences.

== Awards and honours ==
- Two Orders of the Red Banner of Labour (1 July 1942, 5 September 1951)
- Two Stalin Prizes (1946, 1952)
- Honorary Fellow of the Hungarian Academy of Sciences (1960)
- Three Orders of Lenin (17 September 1953, 11 February 1961, 5 July 1963)
- Hero of Socialist Labour (5 July 1963) for outstanding merits in the development of Soviet medical science and health care and connection with his seventieth birthday
- Darling Foundation Prize with Mihai Ciucă for their services in the field of malariology (1966)
- Order of the Badge of Honour (28 October 1967)

In honor of Sergiev in 1978 V. N. Danilov, N. Ya. Markovich and A. M. Proskuryakova named a species of mosquitoes of the genus Aedes, Aedes sergievi [ceb].
