= Warrington Yorke =

British parasitologist (1883-1943)

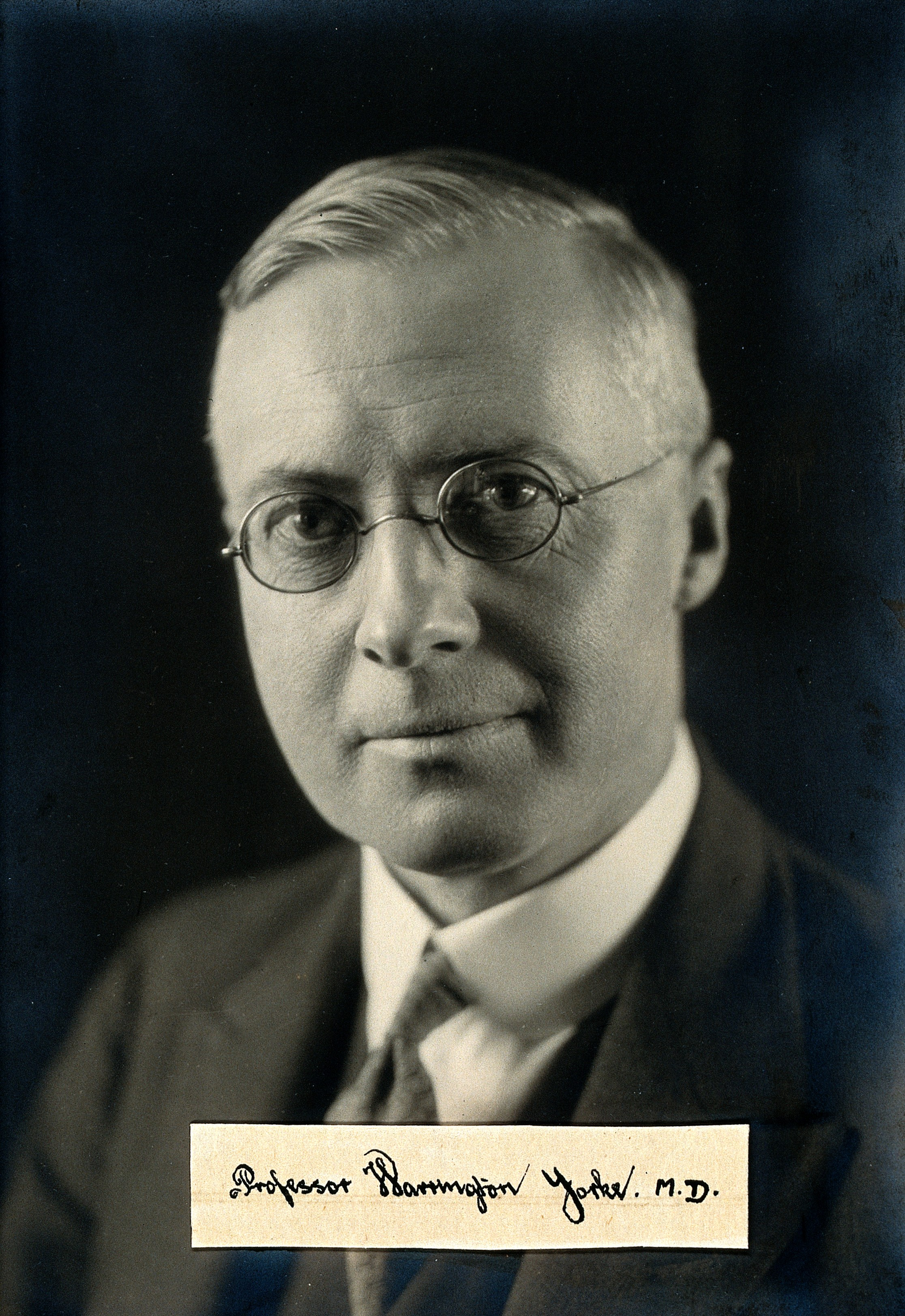
- Warrington Yorke.
- Born: Warrington Yorke; 11 April 1883; Lancaster, England
- Died: 24 April 1943 (aged 60); Birkenhead, England
- Education: University of Liverpool
- Spouse: Elizabeth Annie Greening
- Children: a son and a daughter
- Awards: FRS
- Scientific career
- Workplaces: Liverpool School of Tropical Medicine

Warrington Yorke FRS (11 April 1883 – 24 April 1943) was a British parasitologist and Professor of Tropical Medicine at the University of Liverpool.

== Early life and education ==
He was born at Lancaster, the son of Rev Henry Lefroy Yorke, a Wesleyan minister, and his wife, Margaret Warrington, the eldest of four brothers and two sisters.

He attended University School, Southport and Epworth College, Rhyl, before studying medicine at the University of Liverpool.

== Career ==
In 1907, he joined the Liverpool School of Tropical Medicine. From 1914 to 1929, he was Walter Myers professor of parasitology, and from 1929 until his death he was the Alfred Jones professor of tropical medicine, University of Liverpool.

During World War I, Yorke served as a captain in the Royal Army Medical Corps, based in Malta from 1915 to 1916. He returned to Liverpool in 1916, and produced more than thirty reports on "Studies in the treatment of malaria".

== Selected publications ==
- "The Nematode Parasites of Vertebrates" (1926), with Philip Alan Maplestone.

== Awards and honours ==
In 1925, he was awarded the Chalmers memorial gold medal of the Royal Society of Tropical Medicine and Hygiene for his services to tropical medicine.

He was made a Fellow of the Royal Society on 5 May 1932.

== Personal life ==
In 1916, he married Elizabeth Annie Greening; they had a son and a daughter.

Yorke died at his home, 4 Bryanston Road, Prenton, Birkenhead, on 24 April 1943 and was survived by his wife.
