= Brian Gilmore Maegraith =

Australian doctor (1907–1989)

Brian Gilmore Maegraith (August 25, 1907 – April 2, 1989) (M.B., B.S., Adel., 1930, B.sc. D.Phil., Oxon 1934, M.A., Oxon., 1935) was an Australian doctor and pathologist who was dean of the Faculty of Medicine at the University of Oxford.

== Biography ==
Maegraith was born in Adelaide, South Australia, in 1907 and went to Britain in 1931 to take up the South Australian Rhodes Scholarship at Magdalen College, Oxford. He served in France and Sierra Leone as a pathologist in the Royal Army Medical Corps, led the Malaria Research Unit at Oxford, held the Deanship of Faculty of Medicine at Oxford, and was appointed to the Chair of Tropical Medicine at the Liverpool School of Tropical Medicine in 1944. He died in England in 1989.
