= Lemuel Roscoe Cleveland =

American protozoologist (1892–1969)

Lemuel Roscoe Cleveland (14 November 1892, Newton County, Mississippi – 12 February 1969) was an American zoologist and protistologist, famous for giving the first, strong empirical proof for the existence of a symbiotic relationship between internal microorganisms and their metazoan host.

Cleveland received in 1917 his B.S. from the University of Mississippi, where he spent one year as a graduate student and instructor. After a brief period of military service, he taught for two years at Emory University and then for one year at Kansas State College. He then became a graduate student at Johns Hopkins University, where he in 1923 received a Ph.D. and from 1923 to 1925 held a National Research Council Fellowship at the Johns Hopkins School of Hygiene and Public Health. From 1925 to 1936 Cleveland worked at the School of Tropical Medicine of Harvard Medical School. From 1936 to 1959 he worked at the Biology Department of Harvard University, where he became a full professor in 1946 and retired as professor emeritus in 1959. On the invitation of R. Barclay McGhee (1918–1982), Cleveland then continued active research at the Zoology Department of the University of Georgia and continued publishing papers until 1966.

From biological material collected in the mountains of Virginia, Cleveland discovered that the wood-dwelling, wood-feeding roach Cryptocercus punctulatus contains protozoa in an enlarged portion of its proctodeum (hindgut). The newly discovered protozoa were closely related to termites' intestinal flagellates. The existence of such flagellates had been known for many years, but it was Cleveland who discovered the symbiosis between the intestinal flagellates and their termite hosts and published the empirical proof in a series of papers from 1923 to 1928.

In a series of elegant experiments, done while he was a fellow at the Johns Hopkins University School of Hygiene, Cleveland showed that the ability of termites to live on a diet of wood or cellulose depends on the digestive capacities of their intestinal flagellates. Termites deprived of these protozoa, but still infected with intestinal bacteria and spirochetes, would die of starvation if fed only wood or cellulose, but they could be saved if reinfected with the protozoa.

He also established that the roach Cryptocercus depends upon symbiosis with its intestinal flagellates to utilize cellulose as food. From the early 1930s onward, most of his research was on taxonomic and experimental studies of the intestinal protozoa of Cryptocercus. He made the important discovery of the effect of the host insect's molting on the sexual reproduction of the host insect's intestinal protozoa.

Cleveland collected termites in Panama and Costa Rica with the aid of a grant from the Bache Fund of the National Academy of Sciences. He also collected termites with their symbiotic protozoa (Devescovinidae) in New Zealand and Australia.

Cleveland is known to historians of astronomy as an odd footnote; in 1924, when Edwin Hubble presented a paper at a meeting of the American Association for the Advancement of Science (AAAS), proving that the Andromeda nebula is in fact a galaxy just like our own Milky Way, he was awarded the AAAS Thousand Dollar Prize, a recently established award given for the best paper presented at the annual meeting. But Hubble only received $500, not $1000, because he had to share the award with Lemuel Cleveland, who had given a paper on termite parasites.

Cleveland was in 1952 elected a member of the National Academy of Sciences and in 1955 was president of the Society of Protozoologists. His first graduate student was William Trager.

Cleveland was predeceased by his first wife and their daughter, but he was survived by his second wife and their son, Bruce Taylor Cleveland (born 1938), who became a physicist working at Los Alamos National Laboratory.
