= Rubert William Boyce =

English pathologist and hygienist

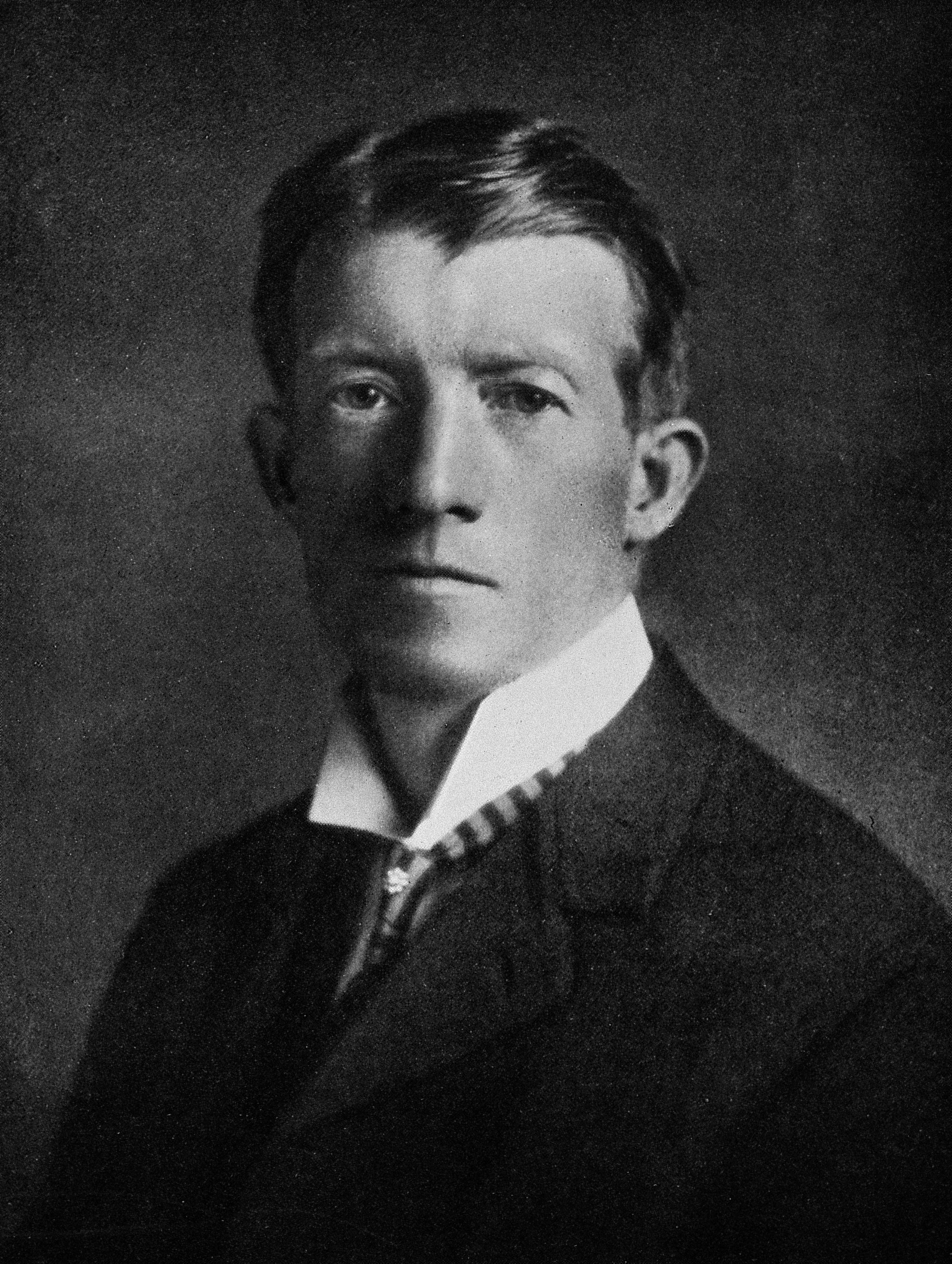
Rubert William Boyce

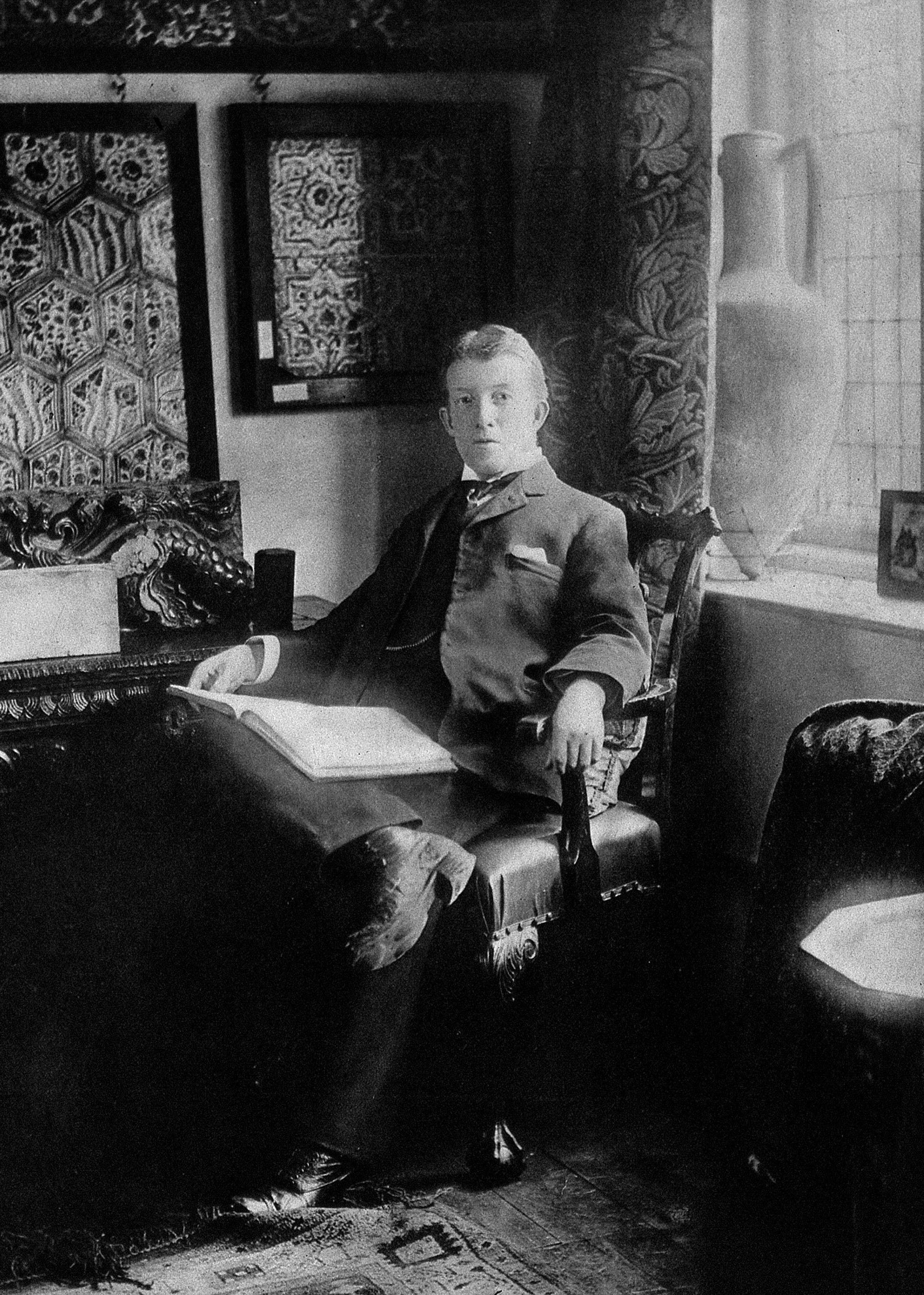
Rubert William Boyce

Sir Rubert William Boyce FRS (22 April 1863 – 16 June 1911) was an English pathologist and hygienist, known for his work on tropical medicine.

== Early life ==
Born on 22 April 1863 at Osborne Terrace, Clapham Road, London, he was second son of Robert Henry Boyce, originally of Carlow, Ireland, an engineer and surveyor of British buildings in China, and his wife Louisa, daughter of Dr. Neligan, a medical practitioner in Athlone. After attending a preparatory school in Rugby, Warwickshire, and then a school in Paris, he began as a medical student at University College London. He graduated M.B. of London University in 1889.

== Academic organiser ==
In 1892 Boyce was appointed assistant professor of pathology at University College, London. In 1894 he was appointed to the newly endowed chair of pathology of University College, Liverpool, then a constituent of Victoria University, Manchester. At Liverpool he organised a laboratory of scientific pathology: in 1898 it was installed in a new building, and at the same time he was appointed bacteriologist to the Liverpool corporation.

Boyce advocated the development and expansion of the college into an autonomous university. As an officer there and of the municipality he was able to forward the creation of Liverpool University, which was established in 1902. Four of its endowed chairs owed their creation mainly to him: those of biochemistry, of tropical medicine, of comparative pathology, and of medical entomology. This was in addition to a university lectureship on tropical medicine.

In 1897 Boyce visited Canada with the British Association. A fellowship for young medical graduates from the colonies was then endowed at Liverpool University.

== Liverpool School of Tropical Medicine ==
In 1898 Joseph Chamberlain, as secretary of state for the colonies, proposed that the school of medicine at Liverpool should establish a department for the study of tropical diseases. Boyce, with Alfred Lewis Jones, then founded the Liverpool School of Tropical Medicine, of which Ronald Ross became director, the post being shortly associated with an endowed chair at the university.

In 1901 Boyce took the lead in organising a series of expeditions sent by the School to the tropics to investigate diseases. In six years there were 17 expeditions, costly in terms of life and money. In 1905 Boyce went himself to New Orleans and British Honduras to examine epidemics of yellow fever.

== Later life ==
Recognition came Boyce's way. He was made a fellow of University College, London, in June 1902 he was elected fellow of the Royal Society, and in 1906 he was knighted. He became a member of the African advisory board of the Colonial Office, and served on royal commissions on sewage disposal and on tuberculosis. In September 1906 he suffered a stroke of paralysis. After a year he partially resumed his university work, although he was permanently disabled.

In 1909 Boyce visited the West Indies to report for the government on yellow fever, and in 1910 he went to West Africa on a similar mission. The last of his projects was the formation at Liverpool of a bureau of yellow fever. The first number of its bulletin was sent to press just before his death. He died of an apoplectic seizure on 16 June 1911, at Park Lodge, Croxteth Road, Liverpool, and was buried at Bebington cemetery, Wirral, Cheshire.

== Works ==
In 1892 Boyce published A Text-book of Morbid Histology. From this time he wrote papers on pathology and tropical sanitation for the Royal Pathological Society, and other scientific bodies. He was joint author with John Hill Abram of Handbook of Pathological Anatomy (1895). Later he wrote more popular accounts, which were influential:

- Mosquito or Man (1909; 3rd edit. 1910);
- Health Progress and Administration in the West Indies (1910; 2nd edit. 1910); and
- Yellow Fever and its Prevention (1911).

== Family ==
Boyce married in 1901 Kate Ethel (died 1902), daughter of William Johnston, a Liverpool shipowner, of Woodslee, Bromborough, Cheshire, and left one daughter.

== Notes ==
Attribution

This article incorporates text from a publication now in the public domain: Lee, Sidney, ed. (1912). "Boyce, Rubert William". Dictionary of National Biography (2nd supplement). Vol. 1. London: Smith, Elder & Co.
