= David Francis Clyde =

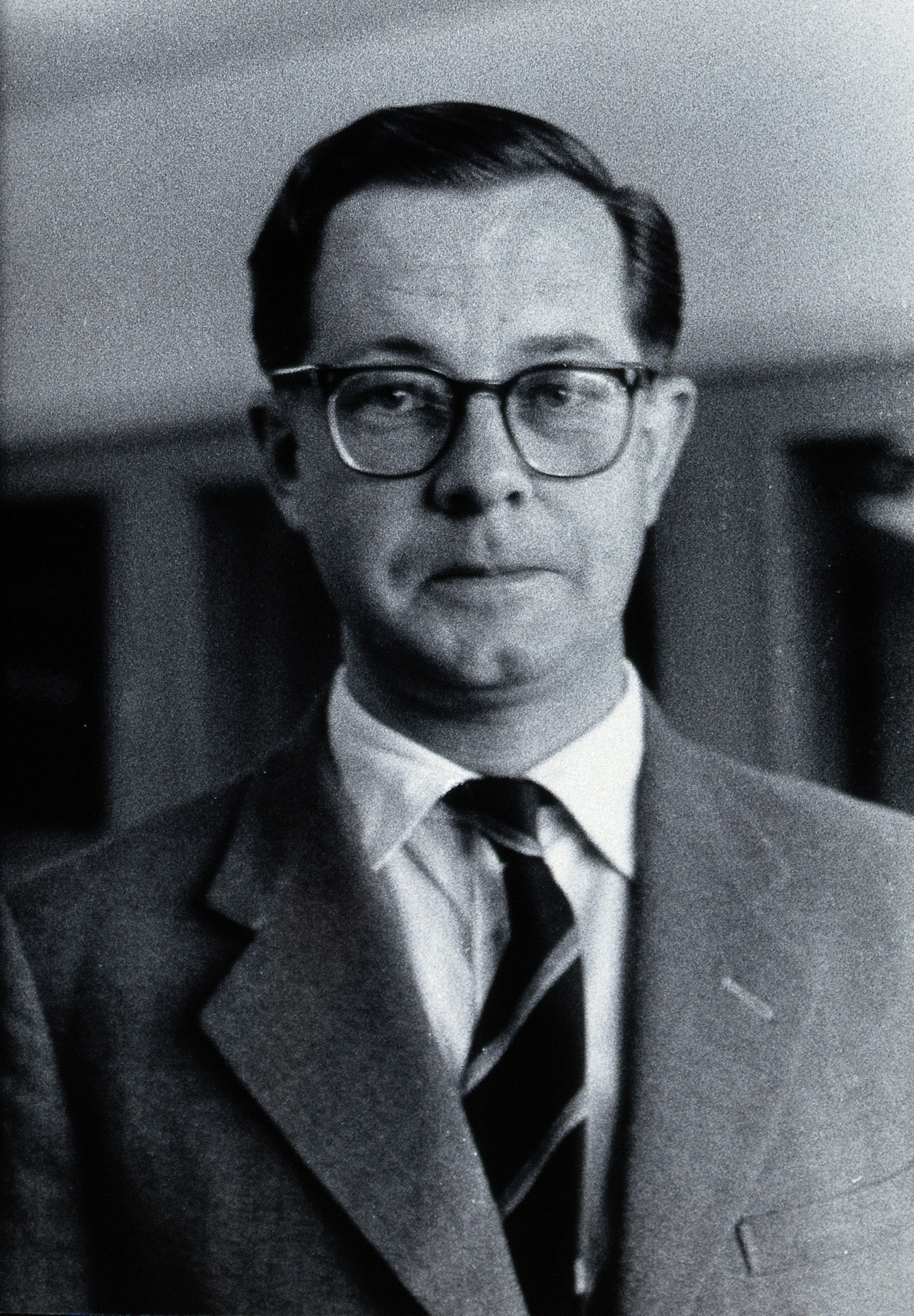
Portrait. Credit: Wellcome Library

David Francis Clyde (13 January 1925 – 12 November 2002) was a British malariologist, tropical physician, and medical school professor, known for his research on malaria vaccines and chemotherapy.

Born in Meerut, India, as the son of a father who was a physician with the Indian Medical Services, David F. Clyde studied from the age of 7 at boarding school in England. In 1940 he was sent to live with relatives in Kansas City, Kansas, where he attended high school. In 1946 he received a bachelor's degree from the University of Kansas. He received in 1948 his medical degree from McGill University Faculty of Medicine in Montreal. Following his medical internship at Vancouver General Hospital in 1949, he married Kathleen Templeton. He then joined in 1949 the British Colonial Medical Service and served in Tanganyika in the mid-1950s as a clinician, malariologist, senior epidemiologist, and then, in the early 1960s, deputy surgeon general in the newly independent Tanzania. In 1963 he received a PhD, under the supervision of Cyril Garnham, in parasitology from the University of London for research on malaria. In 1966 Clyde left Tanzania to do research at the University of Maryland School of Medicine on malaria prevention and therapies. He worked there until 1975. From 1975 to 1979 he was a professor and the head of the department of tropical medicine and medical parasitology at Louisiana State University School of Medicine in New Orleans. From 1979 to 1985, Clyde served as head of the World Health Organization's Southeast Asia Division based in Delhi, India. In 1985 he became the director of the Johns Hopkins School of Hygiene and Public Health and also served, until 1992, as the head of malaria studies at the University of Maryland School of Medicine's Center for Vaccine Development and Global Health (CVD). He held both positions until 2002 when he suffered from pancreatic cancer.

Clyde was awarded in 1986 the Darling Medal from the World Health Organization, in 1988 the Le Prince Medal from the American Society of Tropical Medicine and Hygiene, and in 1989 the Manson Medal from the Royal Society of Tropical Medicine and Hygiene. In 2002 the CVD's David Clyde Research Laboratory was named in his honor.

He died in 2002 in Baltimore. Upon his death he was survived by his widow, two daughters, and one granddaughter.
