= Manson Medal =

The Manson Medal (full name Sir Patrick Manson Medal, originally the Manson Memorial Medal), named in honour of Sir Patrick Manson, is the highest accolade the Royal Society of Tropical Medicine and Hygiene awards. Started in 1923, it is awarded triennially to an individual whose contribution to tropical medicine or hygiene is deemed worthy by the council.

Patrick Manson was a pioneer in medical science called tropical medicine. His discoveries of parasitic infections such as lymphatic filariasis, schistosomiasis (the parasite Schistosoma mansoni), sparganosis, and contribution to malaria research earned him the title "father of tropical medicine." Soon after his death in 1922, the Royal Society of Tropical Medicine and Hygiene decided to create a new medal in his honour. The first Manson Medal was awarded to Sir David Bruce in 1923. The 2022 Manson Medal was awarded to Sir Alimuddin Zumla, the first time in a hundred years that it was awarded to an ethnic minority scientist.

== History ==
=== Background ===
Sir Patrick Manson was a Scottish physician who made important discoveries in parasitology. Working as a medical officer to the Chinese Imperial Maritime Customs at Amoy, in 1887, he discovered that the disease lymphatic filariasis (notably as elephantiasis) was due to a tiny roundworm (now called Wuchereria bancrofti) that was transmitted by the bite of a mosquito (Culex fatigans, now Culex quinquefasciatus). This was the first discovery that certain diseases could be transmitted by insects, the establishment of vector biology. In 1902, he discovered the species of blood fluke, Schistosoma, that caused intestinal bilharziasis. The first Schistosoma species, S. haemtabobium, that caused urinary bilharziasia was discovered by a German physician Theodor Bilharz in 1851. Louis Westenra Sambon gave the name of the second species, Schistosomum mansoni in 1907 in honour of the discoverer. In 1882, Manson discovered sparganosis, a parasitic infection caused by the tapeworm Spirometra.

In 1894, Manson formulated the mosquito-malaria theory to explain the hitherto unknown process of the transmission of malaria, one of the deadliest parasitic diseases in humans. Based on his experiences in parasitic infections, he predicted that malarial parasites were protozoans and that they were transmitted by mosquitos. The theory was experimentally proved by Ronald Ross in India who received the Nobel Prize in Physiology or Medicine in 1902 for the discovery. For his contributions, Manson had been recognised as the "father of tropical medicine."

=== Establishment ===
The Royal Society of Tropical Medicine and Hygiene, (RSTMH) was founded in 1907 by Sir James Cantlie and George Carmichael Low. Manson became the first elected president of the society, serving from 1907 to 1909. Sir William Boog Leishman, Major-General of the Army Medical Services, felt that the London School of Hygiene and Tropical Medicine, an institute Manson had established, should contain a respectable portrait of the founder. In 1921, Leishman collected donations from friends and admirers as the Portrait Fund. There was a leftover of fund after completion of the project. After Manson's death in 1922, the surplus money was given to the RSTMH to institute an award for scientists with outstanding contributions to tropical medicine and hygiene.

On 26 September 1922, the first Manson Memorial Medal (as an honorary award) was given to Lady Manson (Henrietta Isabella Manson) in recognition of her support to Manson throughout the latter's career. The medal was made in bronze having Manson's portrait on one side and the reverse an inscription, "London School of Tropical Medicine."

Sir Charles Scott Sherrington, the president of the Royal Society announced on 30 November 1922:

The Manson Memorial Medal, this year instituted there for triennial award to work of special distinction in Tropical Medicine, is a tribute to Manson's work of example and leadership in that field of medical science.

=== First medal and modifications ===
After the first medal to Lady Manson, RSTMH decided to change the inscription to "Tropical Medicine and Hygiene." The first official medal was given to Sir David Bruce in 1923. Bruce had made pioneering studies and discoveries in tropical medicine. In 1886 he led the Malta Fever Commission that investigated an outbreak of Malta fever (later eponymously called brucellosis) in Malta. He discovered that the disease was due to a bacterium, later named Brucella. In 1894, he discovered a protozoan parasite (later named after him as Trypanosoma brucei) that caused animal sleeping sickness (nagana) in Zululand. Then he led Sleeping Sickness Commission in 1902 to investigate the cause of human sleeping sickness. His team discovered that the infection was transmitted by the tsetse fly (Glossina palpalis).

The inscription had been changed to "Tropical Medicine. A.D. 1922" to commemorate the death year of Manson.

== Recipients ==
The Manson Medal is given every three years since 1923, as follows:

Year	Recipient
1923	David Bruce
1926	Ettore Marchiafava
1929	Ronald Ross, FRS
1932	Theobald Smith
1935	John William Watson Stephens, FRS
1938	Leonard Rogers
1941	Emile Brumpt
1944	Rickard Christophers, FRS
1947	Charles Morley Wenyon
1950	Neil Hamilton Fairley, FRS
1953	Jerome Rodhain
1956	John Alexander Sinton, FRS
1959	Henry Edward Shortt, FRS
1962	Edmond Sergent
1965	Cyril Garnham, FRS
1968	John Smith Knox Boyd, FRS
1971	Gordon Covell
1974	Cecil Hoare
1977	James H S Gear
1980	Richard J W Rees
1983	Ralph Lainson, FRS
1986	William Trager
1989	David F Clyde
1992	Leonard Goodwin
1995	Philip Edmund Clinton Manson-Bahr
1998	David Weatherall
2001	Brian Greenwood
2004	Wallace Peters
2007	Herbert M Gilles
2010	Nicholas White
2013	David H Molyneux
2016	Peter Piot
2019	Janet Hemingway, FRS David Warrell
2022	Alimuddin Zumla

== See also ==
- List of medicine awards
- List of prizes named after people
