= Edmond Sergent =

French physician and parasitologist

Edmond Sergent (23 March 1876 – 20 August 1969) was a French (Pied-Noir) physician and parasitologist, known for his research on malaria in Algeria. His work was often done in collaboration with his brother Étienne Sergent.

== Biography ==
Edmond Sergent was born in Philippeville, today Skikda, in Algeria. He studied medicine at the Faculty of Medicine of the University of Algiers. He was an intern in the hospitals of Algiers in 1896. In 1899, he studied microbiology in Paris in the laboratory of Émile Roux of the Pasteur Institute.

Upon returning to Algeria, he was put in charge of a permanent mission in Algiers, where he inaugurated a Pasteur Institute of which he became the director in 1912 and continued in that capacity until 1963. His time was divided between his work in Algiers and his studies of protozoology under the direction of Félix Mesnil and of entomology under the direction of Eugène Louis Bouvier.

Because of the Sergent brothers' outstanding reputation for their work on malaria, the French Ministry of War sent both brothers in 1916 to Salonika to take measures against the malaria which afflicted 60,000 men of the Corps expéditionnaire d'Orient stationed in Macedonia.

In the second half of his career, Edmond Sergent not only worked on malaria but also did research on many diseases of humans, other mammals, and plants.

He retired to Andilly, Val-d'Oise and died there in 1969.

Edmond Sergent had a strong personality, sometimes bringing him into conflicts with the people around him. Passionate about his native Algeria, he had a strong family spirit, often working his brother Étienne Sergent on the same scientific projects. Edmond Sergent's artistic talent was expressed in many photographs and drawings that he made in Algeria.

== Research ==
From 1900 to 1910, he conducted research on malaria in the Algerian marshlands, developing preventive methods of sanitation. However, the widespread practical applications of his methods were delayed by WW I and administrative obstacles.

From 1927, in collaboration with his brother Étienne, he applied his methods in a 360 hectare area of the marsh of Ouled Mendil, which was part of the marshes of Boufarik.

In addition to his work on malaria, he did important research on role of the body louse for Borrelia recurrentis in relapsing fever (1907–1908) and the role of Phlebotomus in the transmission of cutaneous leishmaniasis (1904–1921).

His discoveries also concern veterinary diseases such as: the trypanosome cycle of the dromedary disease called "le debab" in Algeria (1902); malaria transmission in the pigeon by Lynchia maura, a fly belonging to the family Hippoboscidae (1906–1919); and transmission by ticks of bovine babesiosis.

He also did research on yeast and plant diseases such as: the role of Drosophila in the contamination of yeast cultures involved in alcoholic grape fermentation; and the identification of a Fusarium-type fungus as the causal agent of baioudh, a disease of the date palm.

== Awards and honors ==
- Grand Officier de la Légion d'honneur.
- Croix de Guerre 1914–1918.
- member of the Académie des Sciences.
- member of the Académie de Médecine.
- member of the Académie d'Agriculture.
- Mary Kingsley medal of the Liverpool School of Tropical Medicine (1920).
- gold medal of the Société de Pathologie Exotique (1929).
- Médaille René Caillié of the Société de géographie (1930).
- Prix Osiris of the Académie des Sciences (1957).
- Manson Medal of the Royal Society of Tropical Medicine and Hygiene (1962).
