= William Trager =

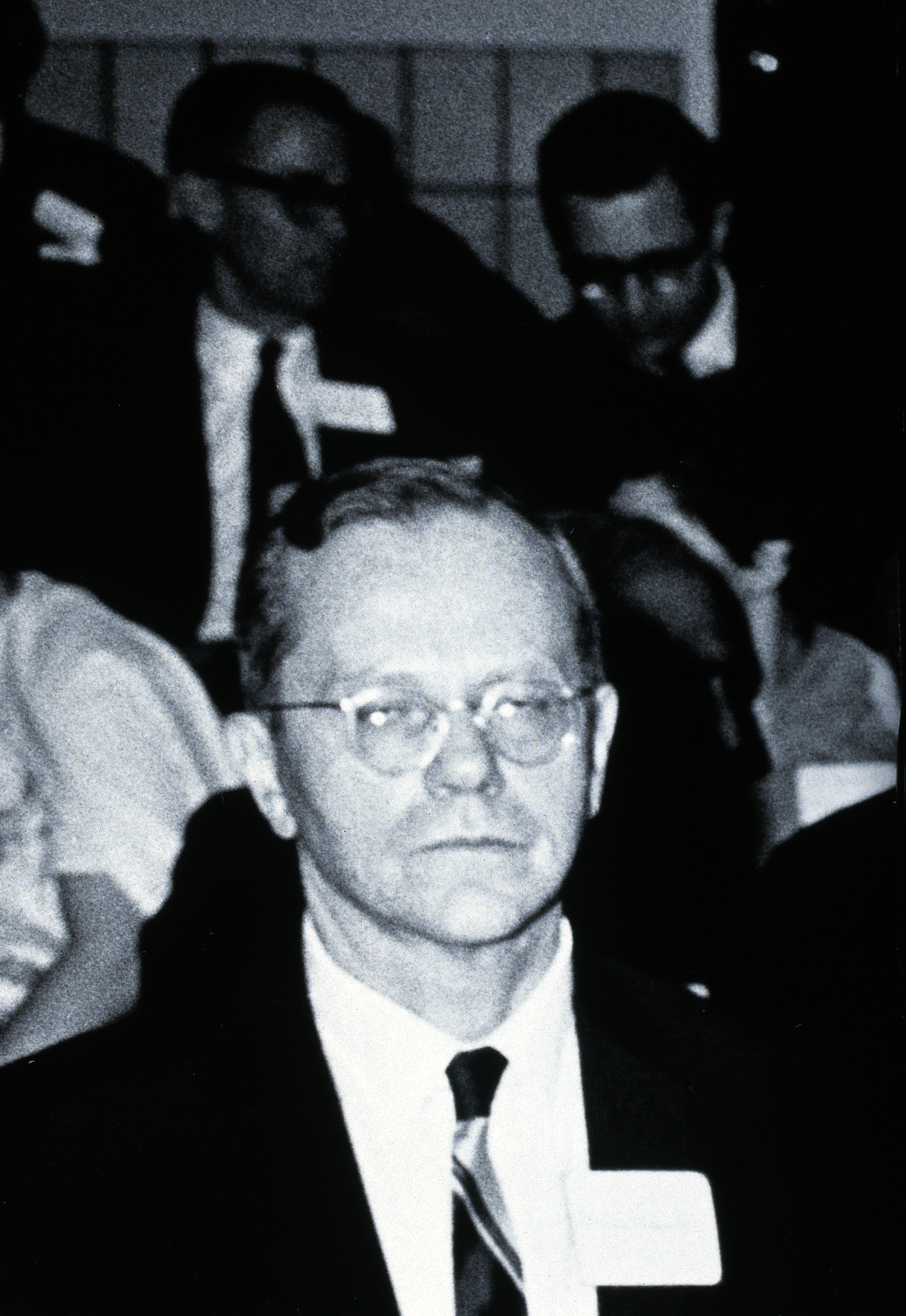
William Trager

William Trager (20 March 1910 – 22 January 2005) was an American parasitologist, professor at Rockefeller University, and member of the National Academy of Sciences of the United States. Trager's research focused on developing microbiological culture systems for a variety of eukaryotic pathogens. He is best known for developing a culture system for the malaria parasite Plasmodium falciparum with James Jensen in the 1970s.

== Early life and education ==
William Trager was born March 20, 1910, in Newark, New Jersey to Leon and Anna (Emilfork) Trager. He received his Bachelor of Science degree from Rutgers University in 1930. He then moved to Harvard University where he was the first graduate student of L. R. Cleveland. In Cleveland's lab, Trager established a culture system for flagellate symbionts of the roach Cryptocercus punctulatus, showing that the roach's ability to digest cellulose was actually due to the cellulases of the symbiotic flagellates. This work formed his PhD thesis, titled "The cultivation of some intestinal flagellates of termites and the nature of the symbiosis between these protozoa and their insect host" which he was granted in 1933.

== Career ==
Following his Ph.D., Trager joined the lab of Rudolf Glaser in the Department of Animal and Plant Pathology in the Princeton, New Jersey division of the Rockefeller Institute for Medical Research as a postdoctoral fellow. In Glaser's lab, Trager developed a culture system for growing the virus Borrelina which causes the disease grasseri in silkworms. Also while with Glaser, Trager developed a system to grow Aedes aegypti mosquito larvae in a nutrient medium, identifying the nutrients that the larvae require for development. In 1934, Trager was appointed to the staff of the Rockefeller Institute.

During World War II, Trager served as a captain in the US Army Sanitary Corps supervising clinical trials with the antimalarial atabrine. After the war, Trager turned his research focus to malaria, investigating the conditions required to grow Plasmodium parasites in culture. He began with work on the bird malaria parasite Plasmodium lophurae, working both on extending the survival of the parasite in culture, and characterizing the nutrients that made birds susceptible to infection. In 1950, Trager moved along with the rest of the Department of Animal and Plant Pathology to the Rockefeller Institute for Medical Research campus in New York City, where he would work until his retirement. Following the move, Trager pursued his interest in how P. lophurae survives inside host red blood cells by undertaking an investigation of infected cells using electron microscopy with Maria Rudzinska. Together, they found that parasites seem to take up pieces of the host cytosol by a type of phagocytosis, and that the pigment hemozoin is formed in specialized digestive vacuoles where hemoglobin is digested. Subsequently, along with Phyllis Bradbury, they described the ultrastructure of the human malaria parasite Plasmodium falciparum, identifying the "knob" structures on the surface of infected cells that allow the parasitized cells to stick to blood vessels. Trager and Rudzinska went on to describe the structure of another parasite of red blood cells: Babesia, for which they discovered the sexual stage, and described its organelles and invasion process. In 1964, Trager was promoted to Professor and Head of the Laboratory of Parasitology, a position he would hold for the next 16 years.

In the 1970s Trager and a postdoctoral fellow James B. Jensen performed the work for which Trager is best known: the cultivation of P. falciparum. They found that they could take the blood of Aotus monkeys infected with P. falciparum, dilute the blood into human red blood cells, and with the addition of human serum and RPMI 1640 media, get P. falciparum to grow for weeks. Jensen greatly improved the culture method by introducing a carbon-dioxide rich environment through the use of a simple air-tight candle jar, where a flame is lit and allowed to burn out.

Trager also worked sporadically throughout his career on kinetoplastid parasites. He showed that the intracellular stage of Leishmania donovani could be cultured for several days, and established a tsetse fly tissue culture system to grow all the life stages of Trypanosoma vivax. He also developed a continuous culture system for the lizard-infecting parasite Leishmania tarentolae. In 1980, Trager transitioned to the role of emeritus professor at Rockefeller University.

== Personal life ==
Trager married Ida Sosnow, whom he has known since high school, in 1936. Together they had three children: Leslie, Carolyn, and Lillian. He died, likely of a heart attack, at his home in Manhattan on Saturday, January 22, 2005.

== Awards ==
Trager received many awards over the course of his life. He received honorary degrees from Rutgers University in 1965 and Rockefeller University in 1987. He was awarded the Royal Society of Tropical Medicine and Hygiene's Manson Medal in 1986, and Thailand's Prince Mahidol Award in 1994.

Trager was president of the Society of Protozoologists from 1960 to 1961, the American Society of Parasitologists from 1973 to 1974, and the American Society of Tropical Medicine and Hygiene from 1978 to 1979. In 1973, Trager was elected to the United States National Academy of Sciences.
