= Herbert Michael Gilles =

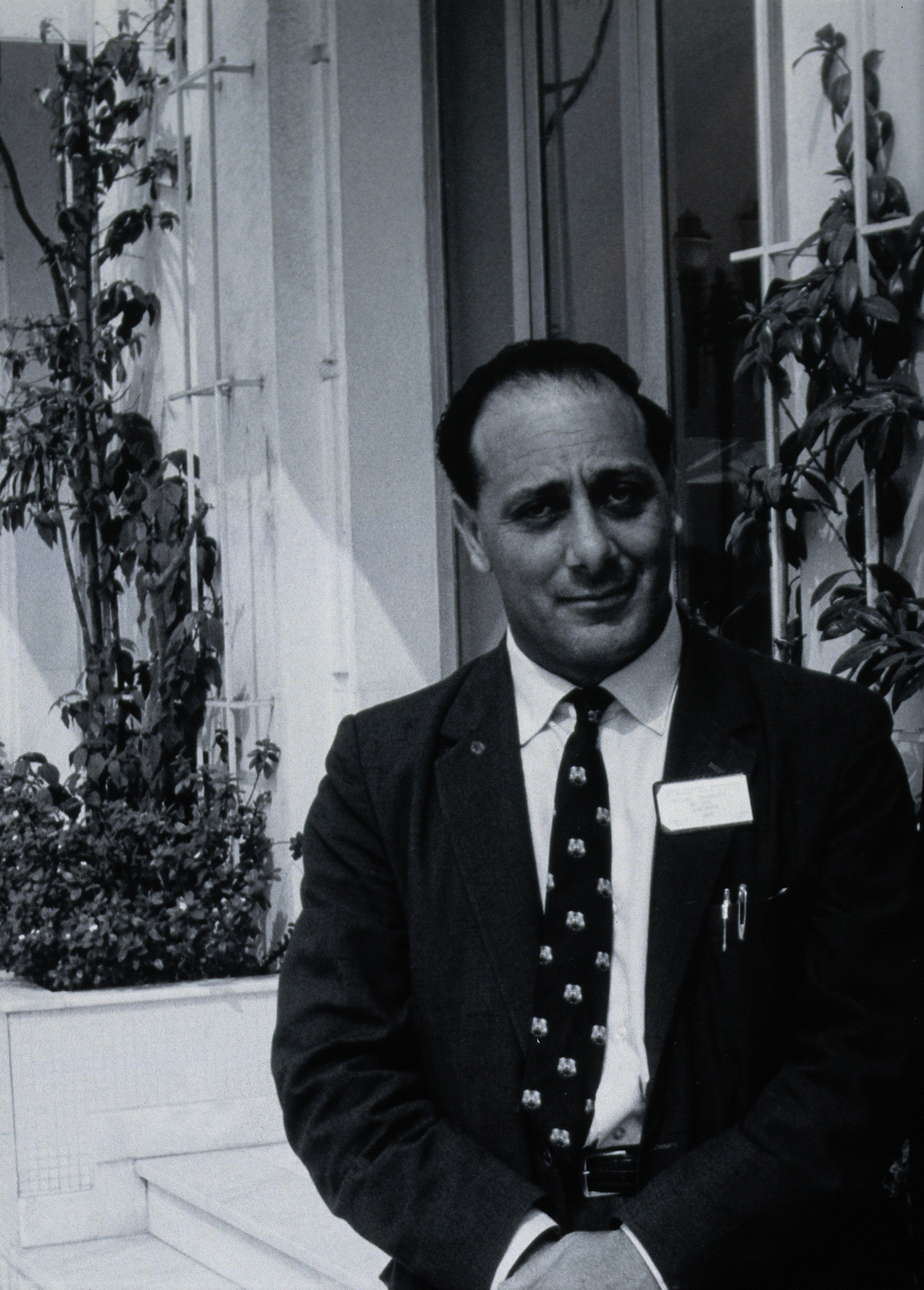
Herbert Michael Gilles

Herbert Michael Gilles CMG FRCP (10 September 1921 – 20 October 2015) was a Maltese-British physician and professor of tropical medicine, recognized as a leading expert in his field.

== Early life, education and military service ==
Gilles was born to Maltese parents (the family name was originally Galea) living in Port Said, Egypt, and went to a French school there until the age of 11. He then became a boarding school student for his secondary education at St. Edward's College, Malta. After completing his secondary education, he studied at the Royal University of Malta, where he received his BSc in 1943. In 1943 he was awarded a Rhodes Scholarship to the University of Oxford but WW II prevented him from utilizing the Rhodes Scholarship. During WW II, Gilles served from 1940 to 1944 as an officer/cadet in the Royal Malta Artillery; during the Siege of Malta, he manned one of the anti-aircraft batteries. He qualified at the Royal University of Malta as MD in 1946. In 1948 he moved to England, where he, by means of his Rhodes Scholarship, received further education at the University of Oxford, qualifying MSc in 1951.

== Career ==
He practised as a house physician at the Liverpool Royal Infirmary while he studied for a Diploma in Tropical Medicine at the Liverpool School of Tropical Medicine. From 1954 to 1958 he was in The Gambia working at a poorly equipped laboratory belonging to the UK Medical Research Council. Despite the rudimentary laboratory, Gilles and his supervisor Ian McGregor were able to do important research on antibodies to malaria.

In 1958, he was appointed lecturer-at-large in tropical diseases by the Liverpool School of Tropical Medicine on secondment to the University of Ibadan, Nigeria. From 1963 to 1965 he progressed to professor of preventative and social medicine at the University of Ibadan. For three years from 1963 to 1965 he held a position as visiting professor of tropical medicine at the University of Lagos College of Medicine, Nigeria, which meant that he spent three months a year in that country.

At the University of Ibadan he met Adetokunbo Lucas, who worked with Gilles to create suitable teaching materials in tropical medicine. In 1965 Gilles returned to Liverpool as a senior lecturer at the Liverpool School of Tropical Medicine and was appointed there in 1970 a professor of tropical medicine, retiring as professor emeritus in 1986. In addition to his professorship, he was also dean to the Liverpool School of Tropical Medicine from 1978 to 1983. He was for a number of years a visiting professor at the University of Malta, travelling to Malta three times a year.

Gilles was the author or coauthor of several books and over 150 papers in scientific journals.

== Personal life ==
He married Wilhelmina (Mina) Caruana on 2 February 1955. They had three sons and a daughter before Mina's death in 1972, in a car accident. He subsequently married Dr Mejra Kacic Dimitri, who died in 2009. He died in Totnes in 2015 and was survived by his four children and six grandchildren.

== Awards and honours ==
- 1969 — Fellow of the Royal College of Physicians
- 1979 — honorary MD, Karolinska Institute
- 1990 — World Health Organization Darling Foundation Medal and Prize
- 1994 — Mary Kingsley Medal, Liverpool School of Tropical Medicine
- 1997 — honorary fellow, Royal Society of Tropical Medicine and Hygiene
- 1998 — honorary member, Swedish Society of Tropical Medicine
- 1999 — honorary member, Italian Society of Tropical Medicine
- 2003 — Malta’s National Order of Merit
- 2005 — Companion of the Most Distinguished Order of St Michael and St George
- 2006 — Knight of Malta (KSJ)
- 2007 — Manson Medal, Royal Society of Tropical Medicine and Hygiene
- 2008 — Companion of the Most Exalted Order of the White Elephant bestowed by the King of Thailand
