= Mihai Ciucă =

Romanian bacteriologist and parasitologist (1883–1969)

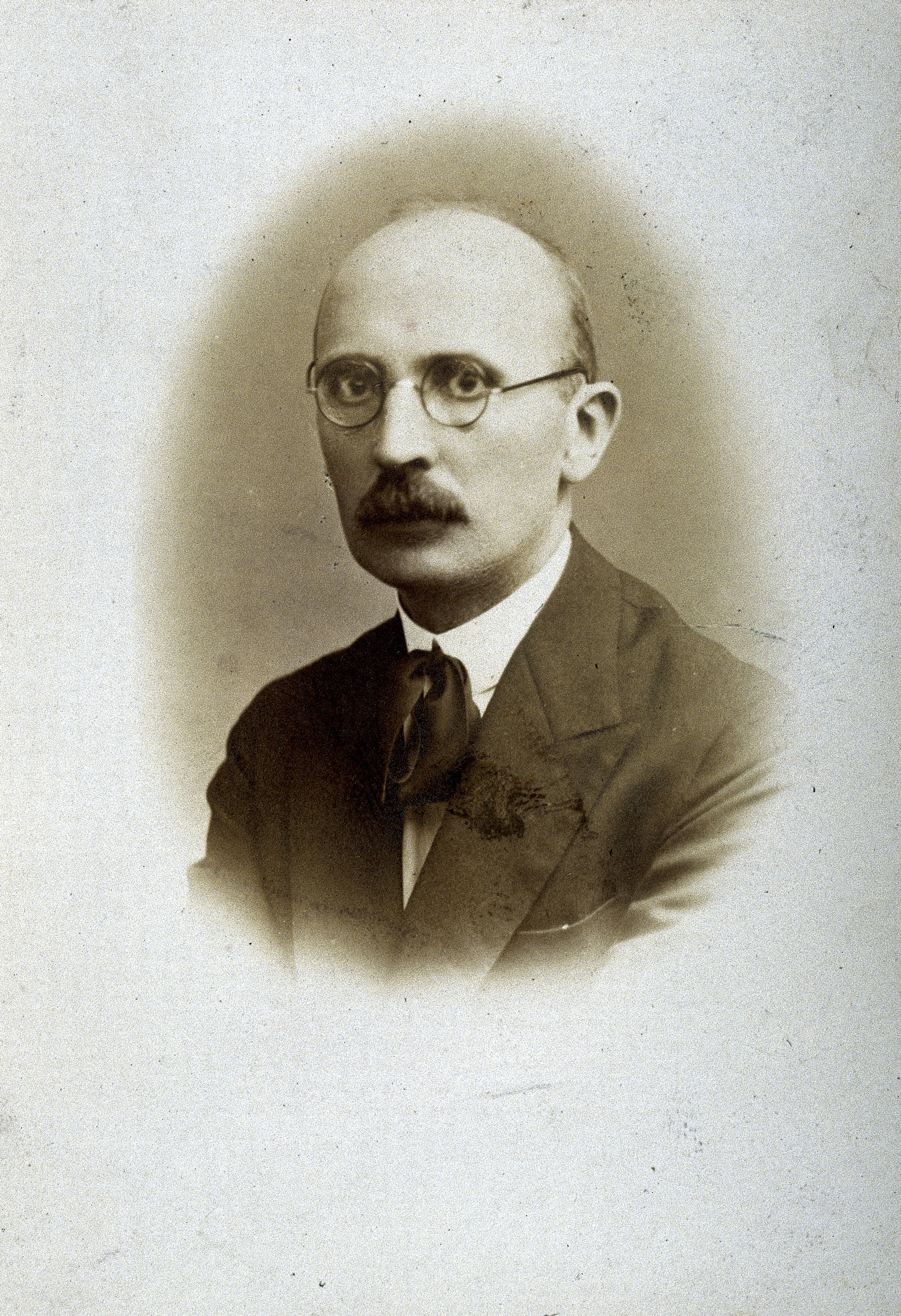
Mihai Ciucă

Mihai Ciucă (18 August 1883–20 February 1969) was a Romanian bacteriologist and parasitologist.

== Biography ==
He was born into a family of teachers in Săveni, Dorohoi County, in the Moldavia region, and spent his childhood in his native village. He attended A. T. Laurian High School in Botoșani, followed by the Boarding High School in Iași, which he completed in 1901. In 1907, he obtained a doctorate in medicine from the University of Bucharest. Ciucă subsequently went to France, where he trained in the microbiology laboratories of Pierre Paul Émile Roux, Albert Calmette, and Constantin Levaditi, as well as in the protozoology laboratory of Félix Mesnil and Charles Louis Alphonse Laveran. He became a hospital physician in 1907, and would remain as such until 1934.

A participant in the Second Balkan War, Ciucă returned to Romania upon the outbreak of World War I. Involved in the fight against epidemics once Romania entered the war in 1916, he first headed an army corps laboratory before becoming director of a military hospital in the temporary capital Iași. Bearing the rank of colonel, his tireless work focused on smallpox, tetanus, gas gangrene, recurrent fever and influenza, and thousands of cases of typhus. He was the first Romanian physician to diagnose a case of epidemic hepatitis. Recognizing the lack of a well-organized hospital for infectious diseases in Moldavia, he helped set one up.

In 1919, together with Nicolae Titulescu and Ioan Cantacuzino, he signed the Treaty of Versailles on behalf of Romania. In 1921, together with Jules Bordet, he discovered the phenomenon of lysogeny, now called the Bordet–Ciucă phenomenon. In 1922, upon the recommendation of Cantacuzino, Ciucă was named professor of hygiene and infectious diseases at the medical faculty of the University of Iași. The creator of the Iași hygiene school, he laid the basis for a specialized department and founded a research laboratory for microbiology and chemistry. Over the course of his career, Ciucă was invited to hold courses in Zagreb, Belgrade, Moscow (1924), Paris (1924), the Hamburg Tropical Medicine Institute (1930), the Malariology Institute in Rome (1932) and Singapore (1934). Together with Alexandru Slătineanu, he set up a model health system at Tomești. He belonged to a team that established an isolation hospital in Iași, using modern methods of triage, diagnosis and treatment. He was also active within the Iași Hygiene Institute, helping form a unified structure of local preventive medicine establishments.

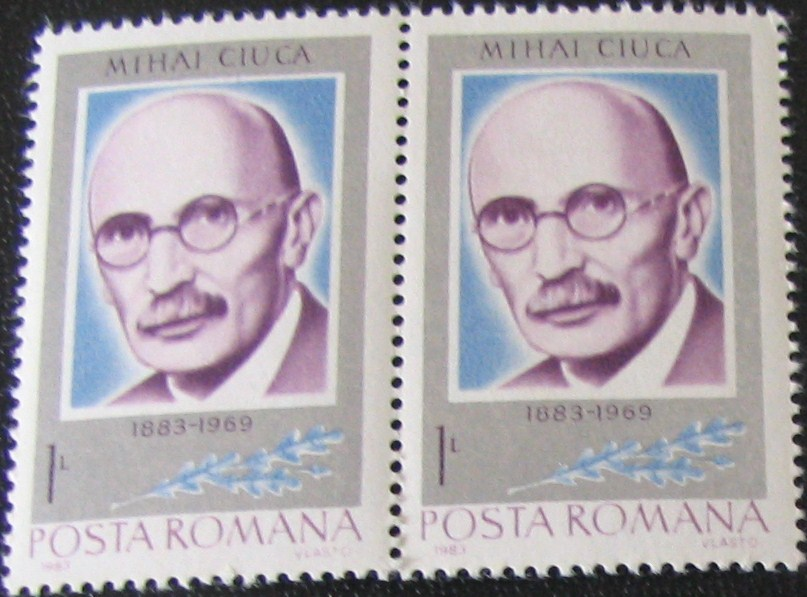
Ciucă on a stamp of Romania

Beginning in the 1920s, he emerged as an expert on malaria, and was at the forefront of efforts to eradicate the disease in Romania. His research included experimental infection and, at Tomești, a malaria study station he founded in 1931. He was a friend and collaborator of British malaria researcher Percy George Shute, who visited Iași several times. Ciucă undertook numerous research visits, not only to malaria-affected areas of Europe, but also to India, China, Indochina and Korea. In 1938, he was elected a titular member of the Romanian Academy.

Ciucă's distinctions included the Order of the Star of Romania (officer), the Order of the Crown (officer, with swords), the Military Virtue Medal, Croix de Guerre and Legion of Honour. He was awarded the Darling Foundation Prize with Pyotr Grigorievich Sergiev for their services in the field of malariology (1966).

Ciucă was an avid art collector; his home office was covered with paintings by Jean Alexandru Steriadi and Dumitru Ghiață, and he had more paintings in his house by Gheorghe Petrașcu (a friend of his), Iosif Iser, and Theodor Pallady. He made two donations of his art collection to the Romanian Academy; the first donation (from 1954) included 260 engravings, while the second donation (from 1966) consisted of 31 engravings and 7 drawings and watercolors. These works included 98 lithographs by Honoré Daumier and engravings by Théodore Géricault, Henri de Toulouse-Lautrec, Paul Huet, Eugène Leroux, Charles-François Daubigny, Édouard Manet, Jean-François Millet, Alphonse Legros, and Eugène Carrière, as well as Albrecht Dürer, Anthony van Dyck, Rembrandt, Jan Dirksz Both, Johan Jongkind, and James Ensor. Another part of the donation included 18 Japanese prints, which entered the collection of the Romanian Academy Library.

In 1983, Poșta Română issued a 1 leu stamp in his honor. The high school in Săveni was named after him in 1992. Streets in Bucharest and Iași are also named after him.
