= Henry Edward Shortt =

Anglo-Indian protozoologist (1887–1987)

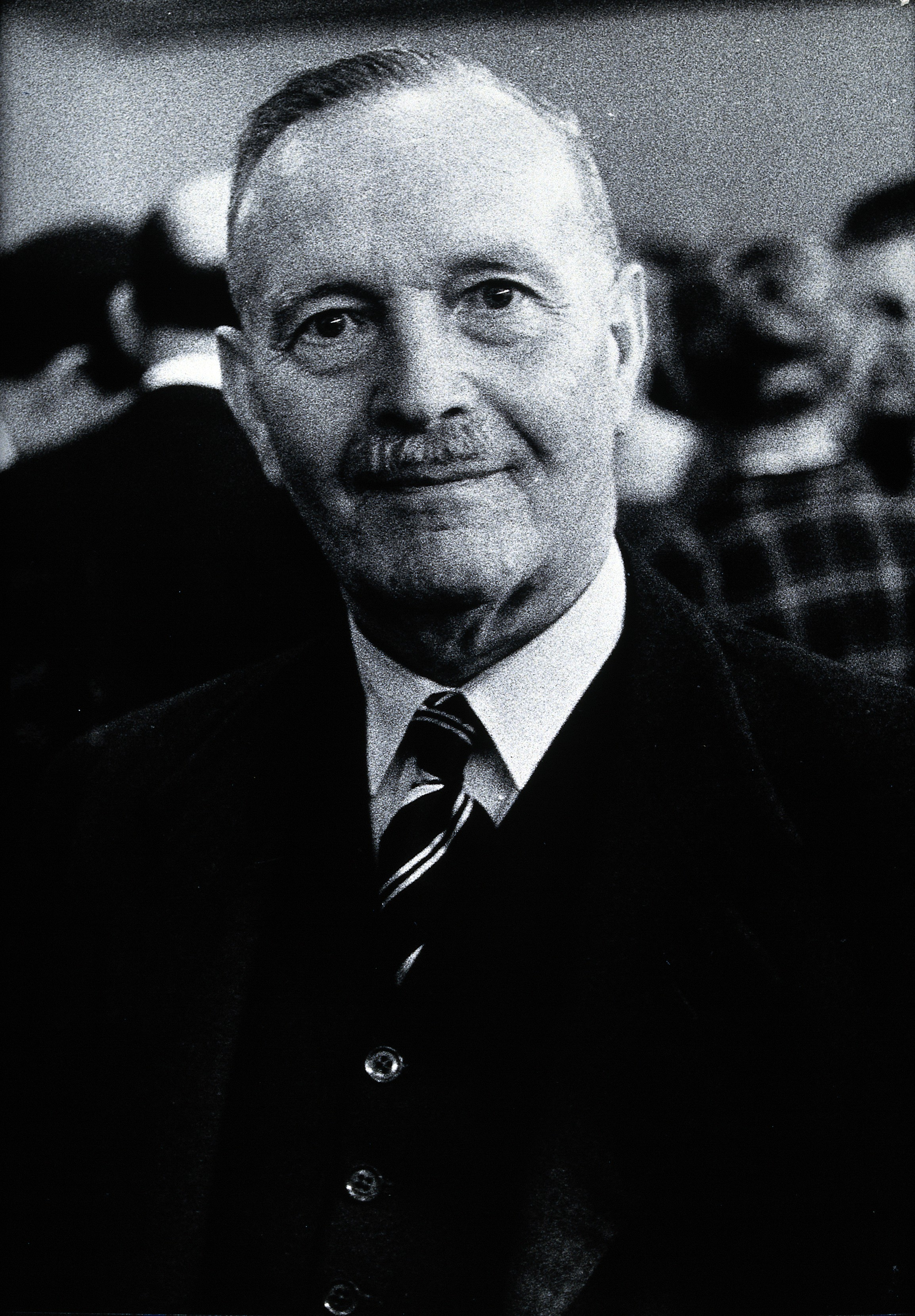
Henry Edward Shortt

Henry Edward Shortt CIE (15 April 1887 – 9 November 1987) was an Indian-born British protozoologist.

He was born in Dhariwal, India and educated in Scotland, qualifying as a doctor at Aberdeen University in 1910.

In July 1910 he was commissioned into the Indian Medical Service, becoming a captain in 1913, a major in 1922 and a lieutenant-colonel in 1930. After a short break in England he returned to India and was promoted Colonel in 1941. After the war he returned again to England.

During his time in India he was a member and later director of the Kala azar Commission from 1926 to 1933 and director of the King Institute of Preventive Medicine and Research, Guindy, Chennai from 1934 to 1938. He was made a Companion of the Order of the Indian Empire (CIE) in 1941. On his retirement he was appointed professor of medical protozoology at the University of London. In 1949 he was elected president for two years of the Royal Society of Tropical Medicine and Hygiene and in 1950 a Fellow of the Royal Society.

His work on kala azar (leishmaniasis) proved that the disease was transmitted by sandflies and that it could be successfully treated with urea stibamine, an organic antimonial compound. He also investigated the nature of Negri bodies in rabies, the developmental cycle of piroplasma (Babesia canis) in the tick, parasites of monkey malaria, Plasmodium gallinaceum and new species of protozoan parasites of animals.

Together with Cyril Garnham he identified the tissue stage of malaria parasites (schizonts) in mammals.

His son William was also an Army Officer.

== Awards ==
- 1941 Companion of the Order of the Indian Empire (CIE)
- 1959 Manson Medal of the Royal Society of Tropical Medicine and Hygiene
