= Kevin De Cock =

Belgian health director

Kevin M. De Cock
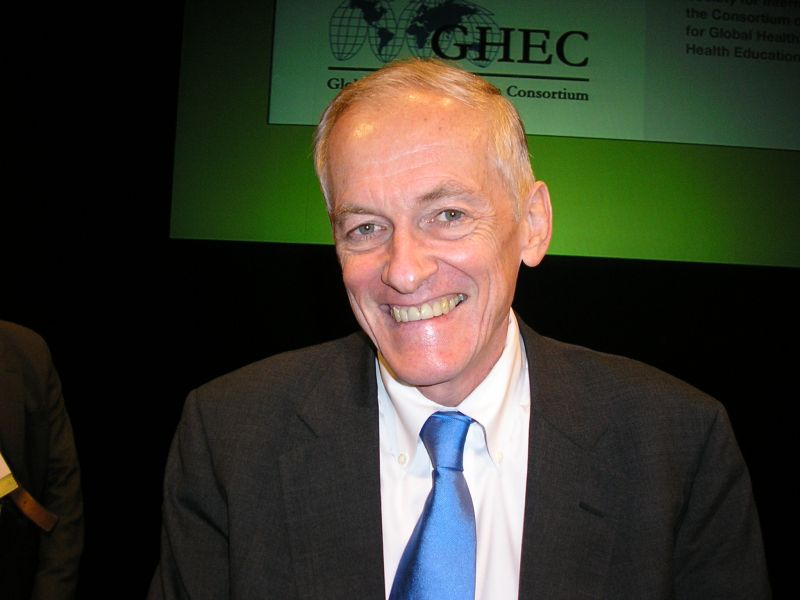
- Born: Belgium
- Occupations: Director, Kenya Country Office, U.S. Centers for Disease Control & Prevention
- Known for: Public Health
- Awards: Chalmers Medal (1995)

Kevin M. De Cock, M.D., F.R.C.P. (UK), D.T.M. & H., is Director of the U.S. Centers for Disease Control and Prevention’s (CDC) country mission in Kenya. He has previously served as the team lead for CDC response to Ebola in Liberia, as Director of the CDC Center for Global Health, and as Director of the CDC Division of HIV/AIDS Prevention, Surveillance, and Epidemiology. Dr. De Cock additionally served as the Director of the World Health Organization (WHO) Department of HIV/AIDS from 2006 to 2009, overseeing all of WHO's work related to HIV/AIDS focusing on initiatives to assist low- and middle-income countries in scaling up their treatment, prevention, care, and support programs.

Dr. De Cock received his medical degree from the University of Bristol, United Kingdom. He specialized in internal medicine, completing his residency in Bristol. He obtained the Diploma in Tropical Medicine and Hygiene from the University of Liverpool, United Kingdom, and completed a fellowship in hepatology at the University of Southern California. He joined CDC in 1986 as an Epidemic Intelligence Service Officer working with viral hemorrhagic fevers. Throughout his career, he has served in a variety of positions and medical schools in the United Kingdom, the United States, and sub-Saharan Africa.

== Sources ==
- Dr Kevin De Cock starts as the New HIV/AIDS Director at WHO
- The CDC Leaders, Kevin M. De Cock, M.D., F.R.C.P. (UK), D.T.M.&H
