= Wallace Peters =

British entomologist and parasitologist (1924–2018)

Wallace Peters (April 1, 1924 – December 2018) was a British entomologist and parasitologist. He is noted for his work on malaria and won the Joseph Augustin LePrince Medal for outstanding work in the field of malariology in 1994. He also won Germany's Rudolf Leuckart Medal in 1980 and Saudi Arabia's King Faisal International Prize for Medicine in 1983. In 2004 he was awarded the Manson Medal.

Among his doctoral students was Wendy Gibson.
