= Janet Hemingway =

British infectious diseases specialist (born 1957)

Janet Hemingway CBE FRS FMedSci FRCP
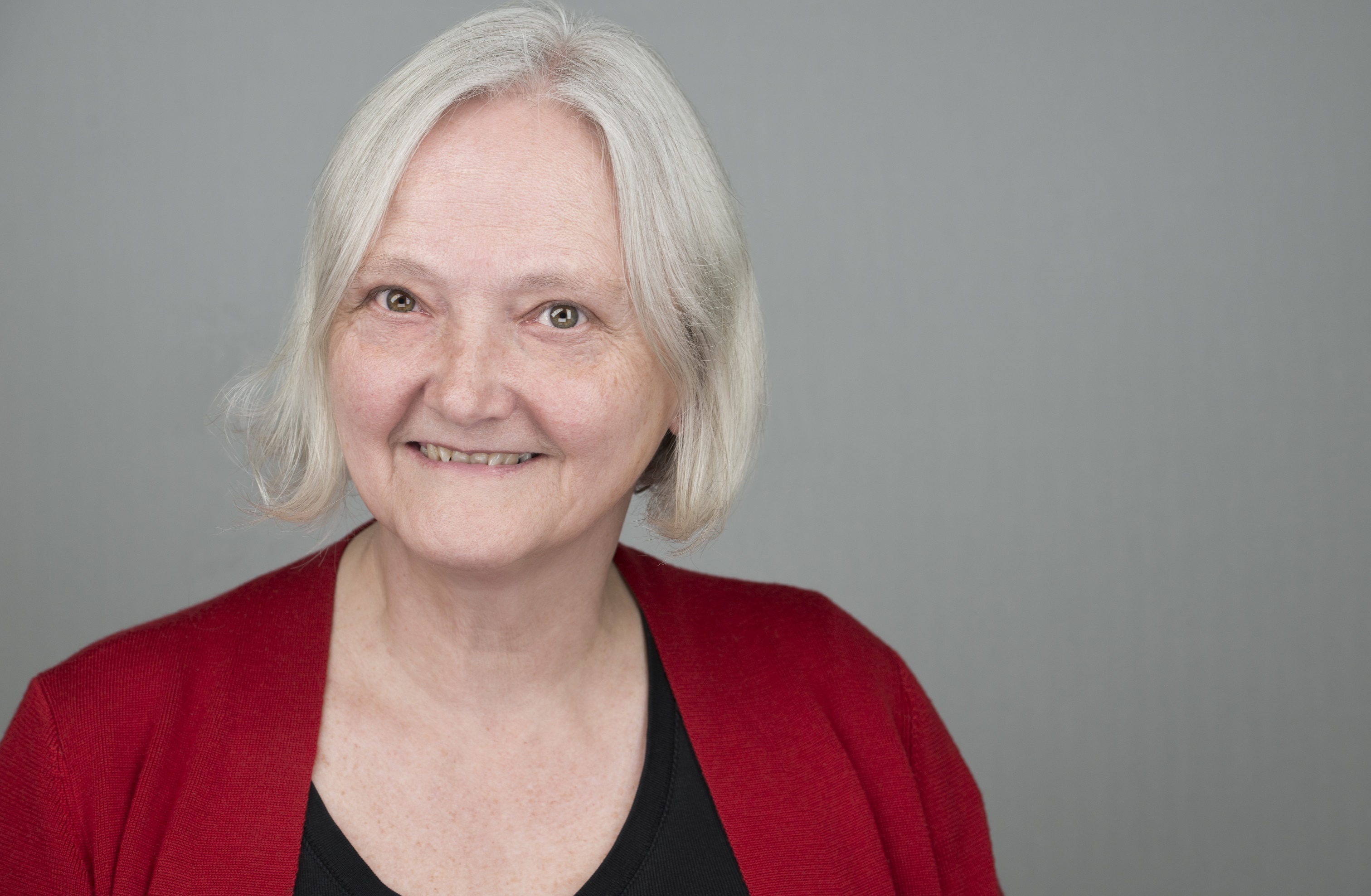
- Professor Janet Hemingway
- Born: 13 June 1957 (age 69); West Yorkshire, England, United Kingdom
- Education: University of Sheffield (BSc); London School of Hygiene & Tropical Medicine (PhD)
- Awards: Foreign Associate of the National Academy of Sciences; Manson Medal (2019)
- Scientific career
- Fields: Vector Biology; Insecticide resistance
- Workplaces: Liverpool School of Tropical Medicine
- Thesis: Genetics and biochemistry of insecticide resistance in Anophelines (1981)
- Website: www.lstmed.ac.uk/about/people/professor-janet-hemingway

Janet Hemingway (born 13 June 1957) is a British infectious diseases specialist. She is the former director of the Liverpool School of Tropical Medicine (LSTM), founding director of the Infection Innovation Consortium (iiCON) and Professor of Tropical Medicine at LSTM. She is the president of the Royal Society of Tropical Medicine and Hygiene. She is the international director of the Joint Centre for Infectious Diseases Research in Jizan, Saudi Arabia.

== Early life and education ==
Hemingway was born in a small mining town in West Yorkshire in 1957 to parents who owned a corner shop. She obtained a first-class honours degree in zoology and genetics from the University of Sheffield, where she set up the university's first mosquito insectary as part of her thesis project. She did a PhD at the London School of Hygiene and Tropical Medicine (LSHTM) and obtained her doctorate after two years of studying the biochemistry and genetics of insecticide resistance in Anopheles mosquitoes.

== Research and career ==
Hemingway specialises in the biochemistry and molecular biology of specific enzyme systems associated with xenobiotic resistance, most notably the malaria-transmitting mosquito.

She was the first to report the co-amplification of multiple genes on a single amplicon and demonstrate their impact on disease transmission.

For her 2012 contributions to the prevention of tropical disease vectors, she received the Commander of the British Empire (CBE).

In 2019, she became the first woman to be awarded the Manson Medal (jointly with David Warrell).

== Personal life ==
Hemingway runs a 15 acres farm in a remote corner of the Cheshire countryside in the north part of England. Her home is a converted Victorian farm built in 1840. "She shares it with five horses, two dogs, a cat and, for now, her daughter ... and her partner."

== Awards and honours ==
- Northern Leadership awards, 2023
- Manson Medal, 2019.
- Awarded Commander of the Order of the British Empire (CBE) for services to the control of tropical disease vectors in the Queen's 2012 Birthday Honours.
- Elected a Fellow of The Royal Society (FRS) in 2011
- Elected a Fellow to the American Academy of Microbiology in 2011
- Elected a Foreign Associate to the United States National Academy of Sciences in 2010
- Conferred Honorary Doctor of Science by University of Sheffield in 2009
- Inaugurated as a Fellow of the Royal College of Physicians in 2008
- Inaugurated as a Fellow of the Academy of Medical Sciences (FMedSci) in 2006.

In 2019, the annual Hemingway Award (a joint award between the Royal Society of Tropical Medicine and Hygiene and LSTM) was created to recognise Hemingway's achievements at LSTM.
