= Liverpool School of Tropical Medicine =

Tropical medicine teaching and research institution

Coordinates: 53.4086503°N 2.9692698°W

- Type: Public
- Established: 12 November 1898
- Endowment: £47.7 million (2025)
- Budget: £102.1 million (2024/25)
- Chancellor: Elhadj As Sy
- Vice-Chancellor: David Lalloo
- Total staff: 787 (2024/25)
- Students: 279 (2022/23)
- Location: Liverpool, England
- Campus: Urban
- Colours
- Website: www.lstmed.ac.uk

The Liverpool School of Tropical Medicine (LSTM) is a post-graduate teaching and research institution based in Liverpool, England, established in 1898. It was the first institution in the world dedicated to the study of tropical medicine. LSTM conducts research in areas such as malaria and insect-borne diseases and operates as a higher education institution with degree-awarding powers.

LSTM is also a registered charity, with a research portfolio exceeding £738 million, supported by funding from organizations such as the Bill & Melinda Gates Foundation and the Wellcome Trust.

== History ==
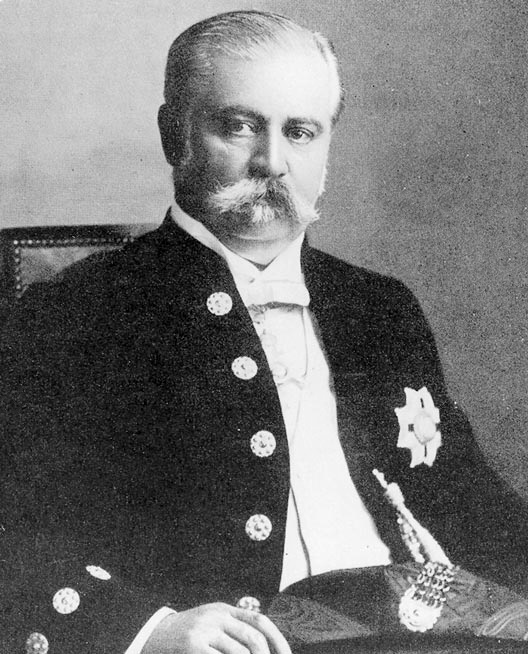
Sir Alfred Lewis Jones provided the funds to found the Liverpool School of Tropical Medicine in 1898

LSTM was founded on 12 November 1898 by Sir Alfred Lewis Jones, a prominent local ship owner. At the time, Liverpool was a prominent port city which carried on an extensive trade with overseas regions such as West and Southern Africa. Consequently, the number of patients in the region admitted to hospital with 'tropical' diseases soared. Recognising the need for a solution to this problem Jones, together with a number of fellow business men and health pioneers, pledged an annual donation of £350 for three years to promote the study of tropical diseases in the city. This offer of financial support was announced at the annual dinner of students of Liverpool's Royal Southern Hospital and was warmly accepted by the hospital's president who later went on to suggest that his hospital should act as the clinical focus of the studies in view of its proximity to the docks.

This initial endeavour later led to Jones's participation in helping to set up the School of Tropical Medicine. Having received news that the RSH greatly appreciated the collection of the hospital's 'tropical' cases into one centre rather than 'leaving them scattered about in the general wards' the suggestion was made that the arrangement might be made permanent. The professional members of the hospital's committee were asked to meet and plan the new school; and in due course the committee communicated its intention to the Colonial Office (which was, at the time, responsible for such matters).

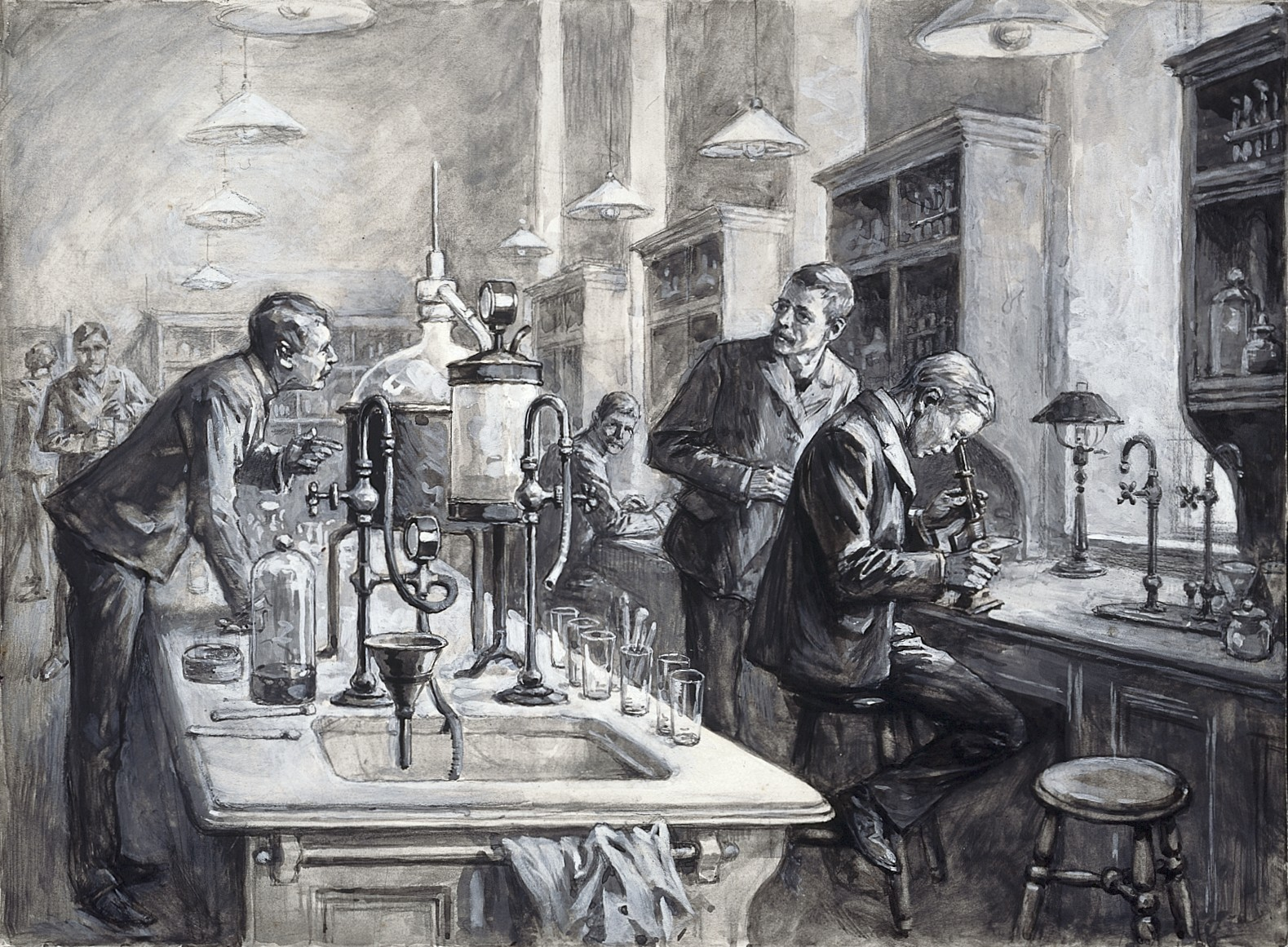
Sir Ronald Ross, C.S. Sherrington, and R.W. Boyce working together in a laboratory at the LTSM in 1899

The Colonial Office acknowledged the creation of the School of 'Tropical Diseases' at University College, Liverpool and commented on how 'excellently equipped for teaching of tropical medicine' it was, but made quite clear that no financial aid would be forthcoming as a similar Hygiene and Tropical Medicine had recently been established in London with the support of the Colonial Secretary Joseph Chamberlain. Although the Liverpool School became active six months before the school in London, it took until 12 July 1900 to persuade the Colonial Office to recognise it officially.

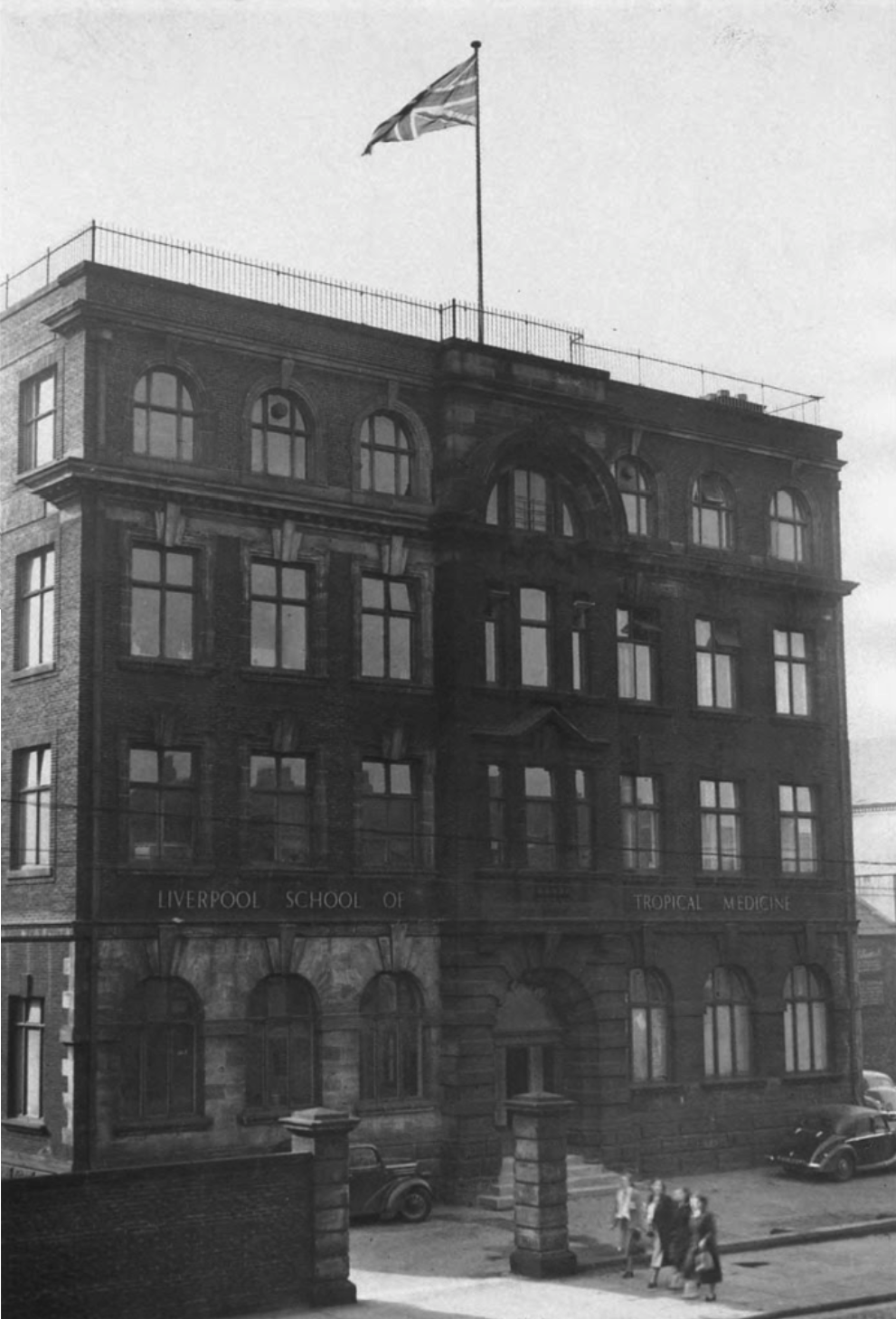
The main building as it appeared in 1951. Note the difference in discolouration between the two-halves of the building which were built at different times

It was not long before the school, helped largely by private donations from individuals like Mary Kingsley (the author of "Travels in West Africa" and an expert in African culture), began to flourish. The school soon recruited the physician Rubert Boyce as its inaugural dean. Boyce then set about the business of appointing teaching staff and secured the services of Ronald Ross as the school's first lecturer in Tropical Medicine. The department was based in the Thompson Yates Laboratory until 1903 when the Johnston Laboratories opened. In 1902, Ross became the first British recipient of the Nobel Prize in Physiology or Medicine for his work on malaria transmission and in the same year a separate department of Tropical Veterinary medicine was set up with a dedicated laboratory at Crofton Lodge in Runcorn to allow for the study of large animals. Other notable staff of the time included Joseph Everett Dutton, who discovered one of the trypanosomes that cause sleeping sickness; Harold Wolferstan Thomas who developed the first effective treatment for the disease, and his collaborator Anton Breinl, who later became 'the father of tropical medicine' in Australia.

The school received a substantial endowment from soap industrialist William Lever, 1st Viscount Leverhulme, who was chairman from 1910 to 1913 and when Alfred Lewis Jones died in 1909 he left it a large bequest. Thanks to donations the school was able to set up its own laboratory and teaching premises in Pembroke Place, separate from the University of Liverpool, upon whose facilities it had previously relied. The laboratory was completed in 1914 but due to the advent of the war occupation of the building was deferred and it was used as a Tropical Diseases Hospital offering courses to officers of the Royal Army Medical Corps. Professor R M Gordon joined the school in 1919 and by 1920 teaching had resumed and the school finally moved into its own building.

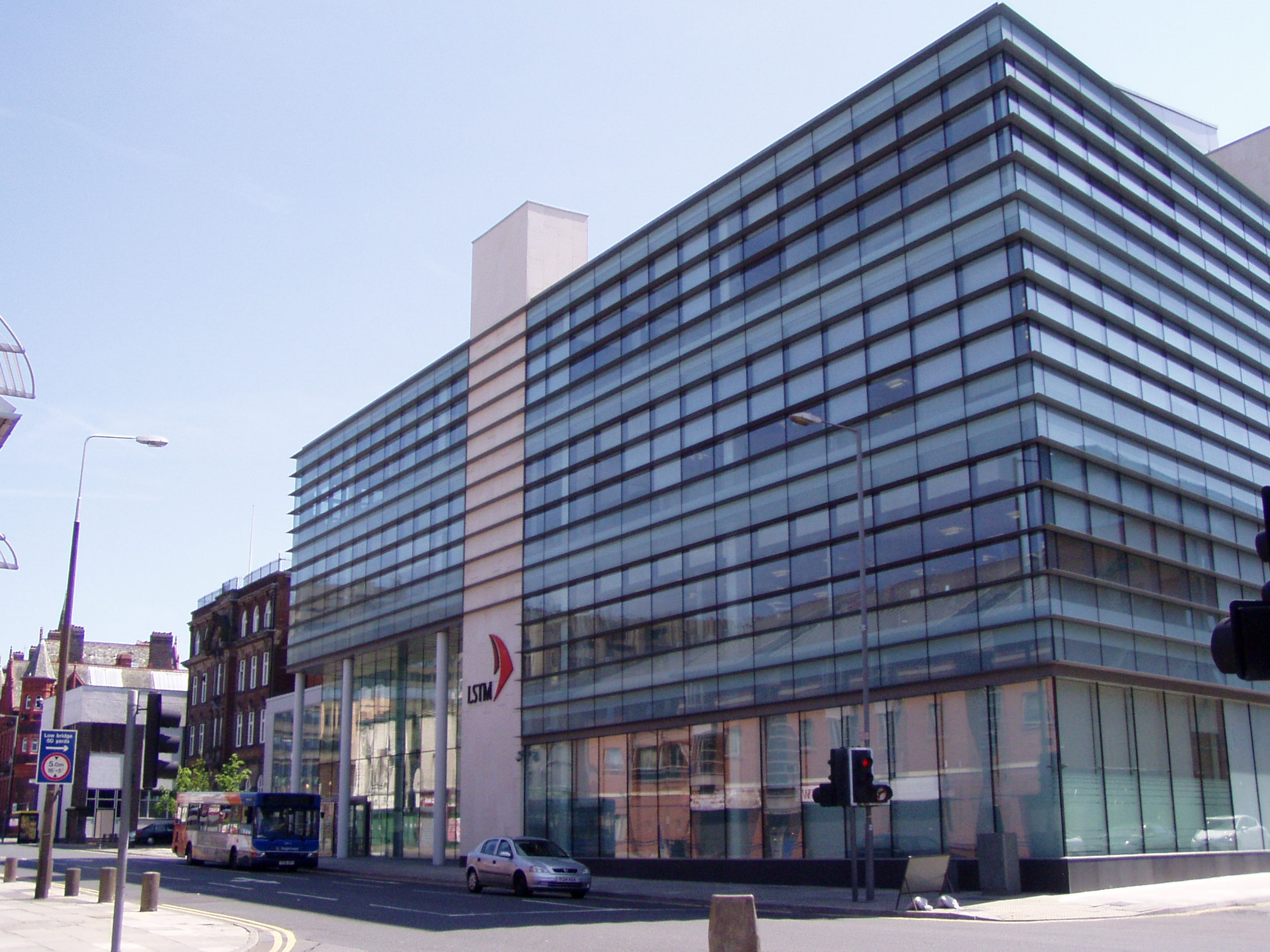
The new and original buildings

In 1921, the school opened its first overseas research laboratory in Freetown, Sierra Leone. This laboratory functioned continuously until the early stages of World War II and made many important discoveries in West Africa, including demonstrating that a species of black fly was responsible for transmission of filarial worm to humans, causing river blindness. It was work like this that was essential for the Liverpool school to understand tropical diseases and subsequently the school completed 32 expeditions to Africa and Central and South America over the following years. After World War II the Freetown laboratory was abandoned.

In 1946, the appointment of Brian Maegraith as Dean marked a broadening of the School's size and curriculum. The school forged links with other research institutions across the globe. An example of this is the Malawi Liverpool Wellcome Trust Clinical Research Programme which conducts research into local diseases of importance to Malawi.

From 2000 until 2019, LSTM was directed by Janet Hemingway, who initiated large financial investment and expansion. In 2005 the Bill and Melinda Gates Foundation gave £28m to the Innovative Vector Control Consortium (IVCC) for research to develop insecticides for mosquito control. IVCC was founded by LSTM Director Janet Hemingway.

The school received higher education institution status in 2013 and in 2017 was awarded its own degree awarding powers by the Privy Council.

In 2017, in partnership with the University of Liverpool, LSTM co-founded the Centre of Excellence in Infectious Diseases Research (CEIDR), which focused on improving global healthcare and medical technologies.

== Location ==
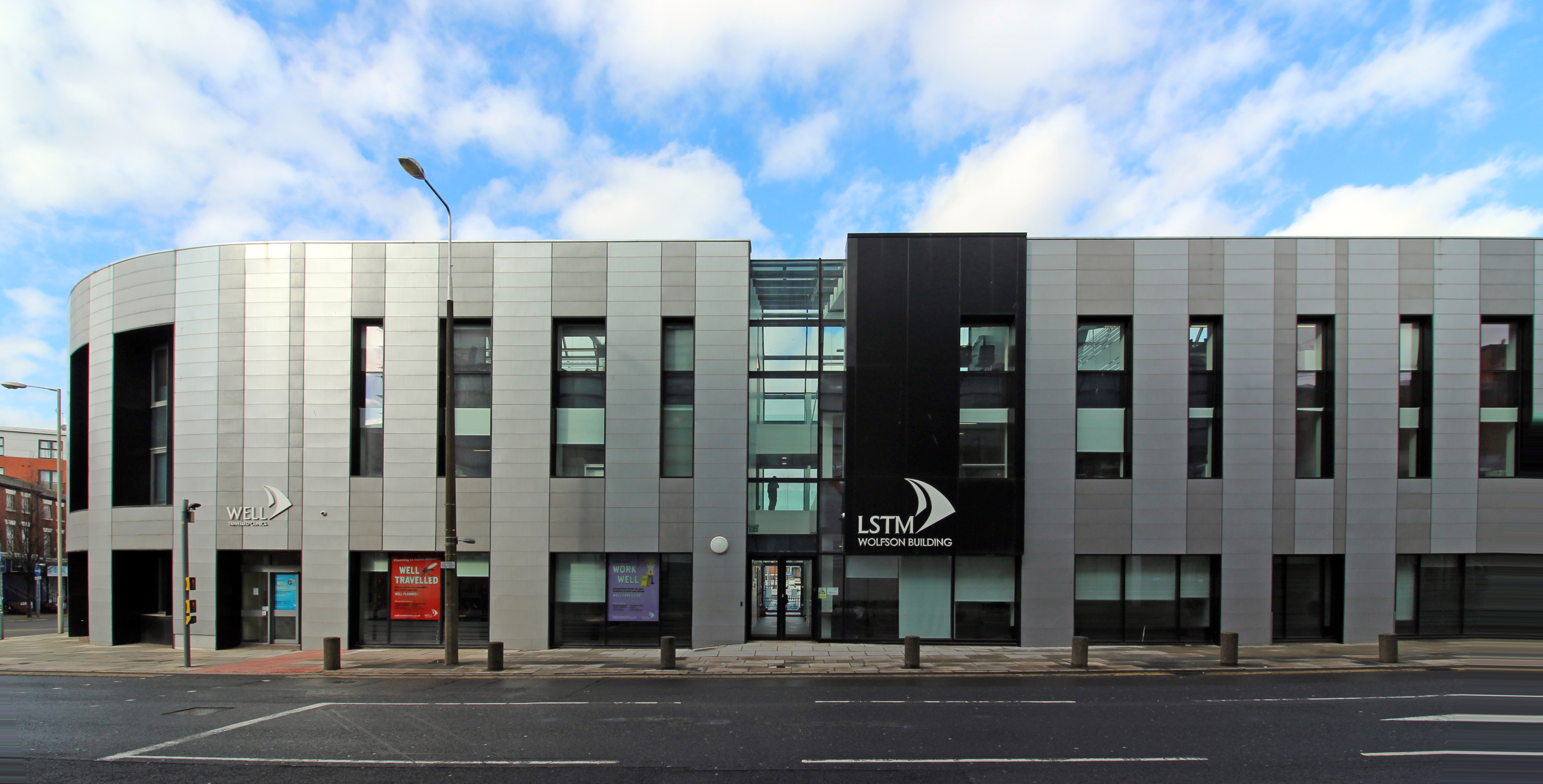
Wolfson Building, opened in 2014

The school is located in buildings in Liverpool close to Royal Liverpool University Hospital.

== Organisation and administration ==
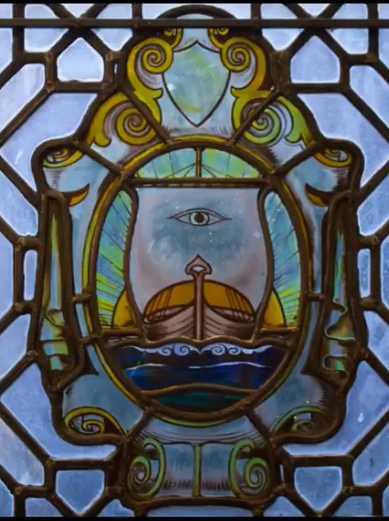
The school's traditional emblem depicted in a stained glass window in the main building

The school's traditional emblem depicts a Viking longboat under sail and was designed by the famed Glaswegian designer Herbert MacNair. The Viking longboat depicted in the emblem is a reference to Liverpool's maritime heritage and the school's location in Northern England, an area with significant historical links to Scandinavia that was subject to Viking invasion and the Danelaw throughout the tenth century. The fact that the ship is depicted under sail refers to 'journeys to unknown destinations', a reflection on the school's mission to research and treat tropical diseases. Similarly, the rising sun placed directly behind the ship indicates the beginning of the journey and pays respect to its auspicious motives. Finally, the eye depicted on the ship's sail pays homage to ancient deities connected with healing, particularly in Greek mythology.

The school's current logo is derived from its traditional emblem and depicts a stylised red-maroon sail.

Sir Rubert Boyce became the school's first director upon its foundation in 1898, however there would not be another 'director' for almost ninety years. The director post that Boyce held became associated with the newly endowed chair of tropical medicine upon its creation in 1902. The title of director was replaced with 'Dean' until it was brought back into use with the election of David Molyneux in 1991. In 2024 David Lalloo became the first vice chancellor of LSTM, while Elhadj As Sy became the first chancellor.

== Academic profile ==
Rankings
Global rankings
- ARWU (2026): 701—800

LSTM has a broad portfolio of basic and translational research and policy activities in infectious diseases and public health research. To achieve this, the school is split into four departments: (a) International Public Health (b) Tropical Disease Biology (c) Clinical Sciences and (d) Vector Biology.

=== Department of International Public Health ===
The Department of International Public Health specialises in the use of research to guide policies, strengthen health systems and improve health care. This is achieved through work on monitoring and evaluation, gender equity, capacity strengthening and research into the role of human resources in policy development.

=== Department of Tropical Disease Biology ===
The Department of Tropical Disease Biology explores the biology of parasites, bacteria and viruses, as well as research into snakebite and neglected tropical diseases.

=== Department of Clinical Sciences ===
The department for Clinical Sciences focuses on the diagnosis, treatment and prevention of disease. Researchers work across a broad spectrum of clinical sciences, including: experimental medicine; evidence synthesis; clinical trials; implementation and evaluation; teaching and clinical practice. Specific areas of interest include clinical infectious disease epidemiology, developing preventative and therapeutic strategies for respiratory infections, and improving child and adolescent health.

=== Department of Vector Biology ===
The Department of Vector Biology has a research profile that spans from functional genomics of disease vectors, clinical trials, implementation research and the development of tools for monitoring and evaluation of disease transmission. The department's research is centred on improving the control of vector borne diseases in the developing world.

This Department has long been one of the world's premier sites of research on African Animal Trypanosomiasis (AAT, nagana), the major livestock disease in Africa.

=== Research themes ===
Nine research themes, which draw upon expertise from all four research departments. The themes are: Malaria and Neglected Tropical Diseases (NTDs); Community Health and Resilient Health Systems; Emerging and Re-emerging Diseases; Equity and Capacity Research; Innovation to Impact: Therapeutics, Diagnostics, Vaccines; Maternal, Neonatal, Sexual and Reproductive Health; Tuberculosis and Antimicrobial Resistance; Vector Control and Resistance Management and Climate Health.

=== Teaching ===
LSTM offers a range of postgraduate education programmes, teaching over 600 students from around the world. These vary from taught master's degrees in humanitarian assistance and international public health, diplomas and short courses in tropical and infectious diseases, to research degrees leading to MPhil, DrPH and PhD.

=== Awards ===
The Mary Kingsley Medal was instituted by LSTM co-founder John Holt in 1903 and is awarded for outstanding contributions in the field of tropical medicine. It is named in honour Mary Kingsley, a noted traveller and writer of the late 19th century, who had a powerful influence on the way Africa was perceived at the time, and who died in South Africa at the age of 38 from suspected typhoid. The 100th award was made in 2015.

Recipients of the award include Patrick Manson, David Bruce, Waldemar Haffkine, Bernard Nocht, Hans Vogel, and Frederick Vincent Theobald.

== Notable people ==
=== Directors and deans ===
- Sir Rubert Boyce (1898–1902)
- Sir Ronald Ross (1902–1913)
- Lt Col. John W Watson Stephens (1913-1929)
- Warrington Yorke (1929–1943)
- vacant (1943-46)
- Brian Maegraith (1946–1975)
- Wallace Peters (1975–1978)
- Herbert M Gilles (1978–1983)
- William MacDonald (1983-1988)
- Ralph Hendrickse (1988-1991)
- David Molyneux (1991–2000)
- Janet Hemingway (2000–2019)
- David Lalloo (2019–present)

=== Staff ===
- Anton Breinl - discovered that atoxyl cures trypanosomiasis and established the first Australian Institute of Tropical Medicine in Townsville, Queensland, Australia
- Janet Hemingway - British Parasitologist, Professor of Insect Molecular Biology at LSTM
- Warrington Yorke - British parasitologist, and Professor of Tropical Medicine at the University of Liverpool

== Notable alumni ==
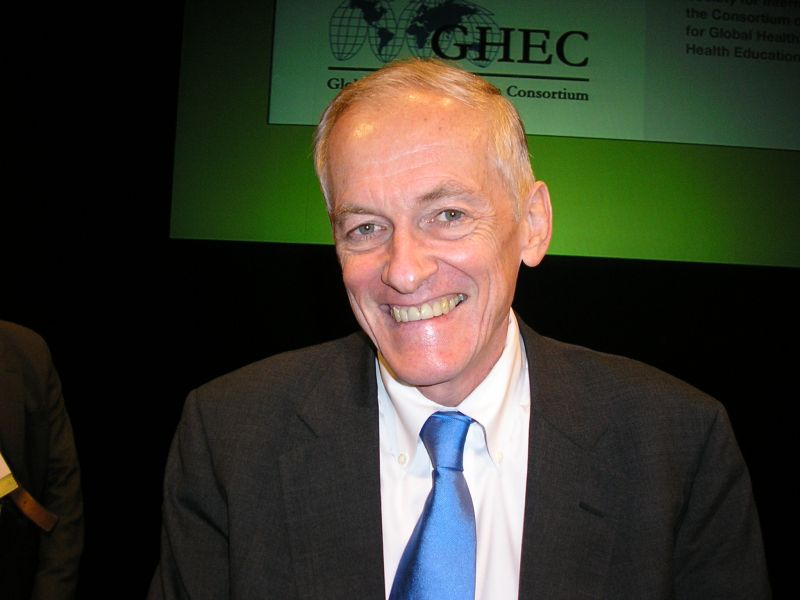
Kevin De Cock

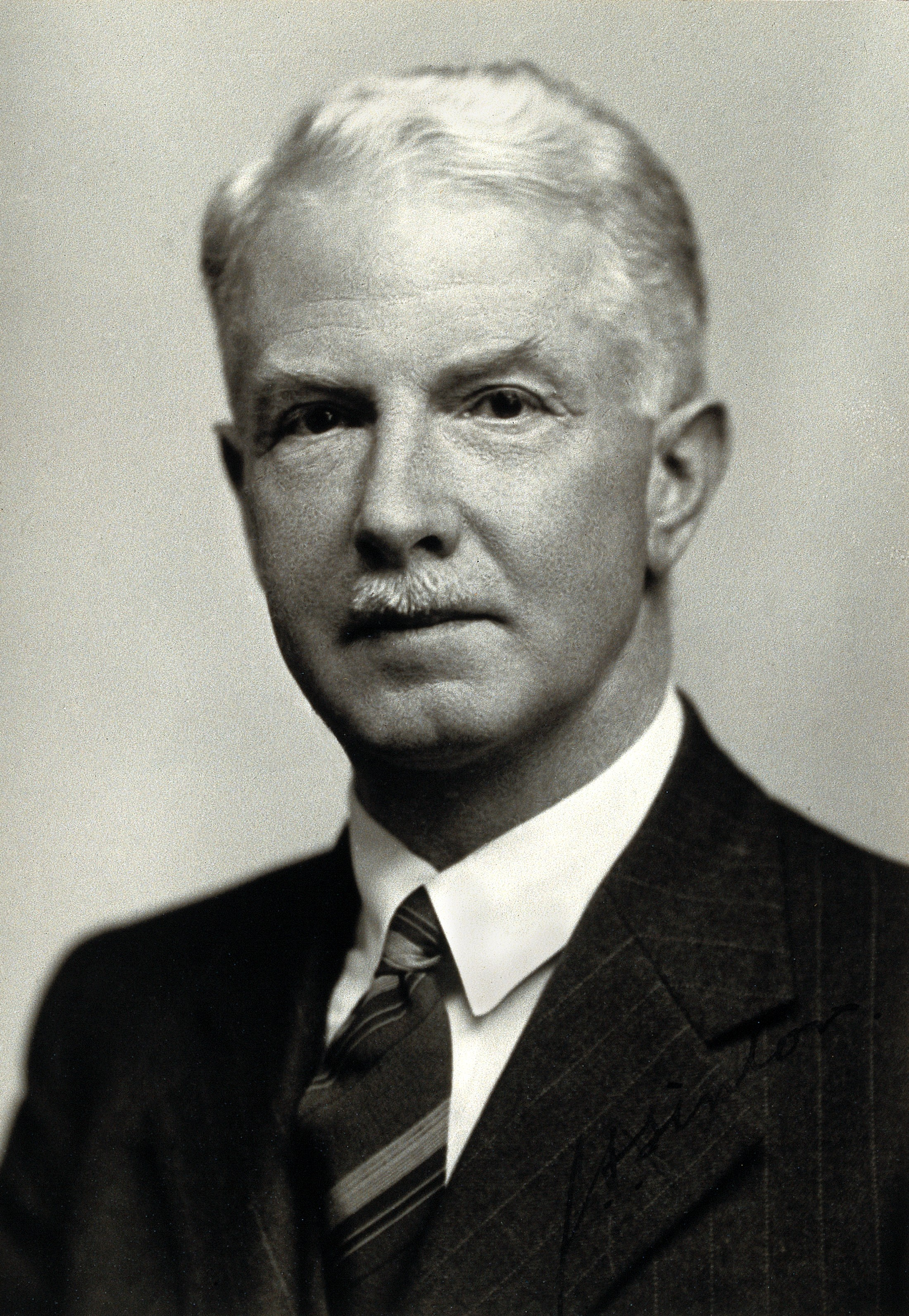
John Alexander Sinton
- Francis Camps - English pathologist, who lived from 1905 until 1972.
- Ian Clarke - a physician, missionary, philanthropist, entrepreneur and politician, currently serving as Mayor of Makindye Division, a borough of Kampala, the capital city of Uganda.
- Kevin De Cock - An American physician, Director of the U.S. Centers for Disease Control and Prevention (CDC) Country Mission to Kenya.
- John William Kibukamusoke, a Ugandan physician, an academic, a personal physician to Idi Amin, and the first Ugandan High Commissioner to Australia.
- Matthew Lukwiya - A Ugandan physician and pediatrician, formerly the Medical Director of St. Mary's Hospital Lacor.
- Sir Milton Margai - first Prime Minister of Sierra Leone.
- Letitia Obeng - studied at the school for her PhD in the early 1960s, becoming the first woman from Ghana to be awarded a doctorate. Her research focussed on the growth of disease vectors in freshwater lakes, particularly the blackfly that carries river blindness. She is often referred to as the 'grandmother of all female Ghanaian scientists'.
- Brigadier John Alexander Sinton - British military officer, medical doctor and malariologist
- J. S. Steward - English biologist and veterinary scientist specialising in mammalogy, chemical pathology and microbiology, who attended the school from 1930 after graduating from the University of Edinburgh.
- Fred Wabwire-Mangen - Ugandan physician, public health specialist and medical researcher. Professor of Epidemiology and Head of Department of Epidemiology & Biostatistics at Makerere University School of Public Health.
- Wu Lien-teh - Malaysian Chinese Physician prominent in public health. Battled the great Manchurian Plague, Inventor of the modern N95 mask.

== See also ==
- Hospital for Tropical Diseases in London
- Liverpool Knowledge Quarter
- Prince Leopold Institute of Tropical Medicine (Belgium)
- Royal Society of Tropical Medicine and Hygiene
