= Cyril Garnham =

British parasitologist

Cyril Garnham CMG FRS
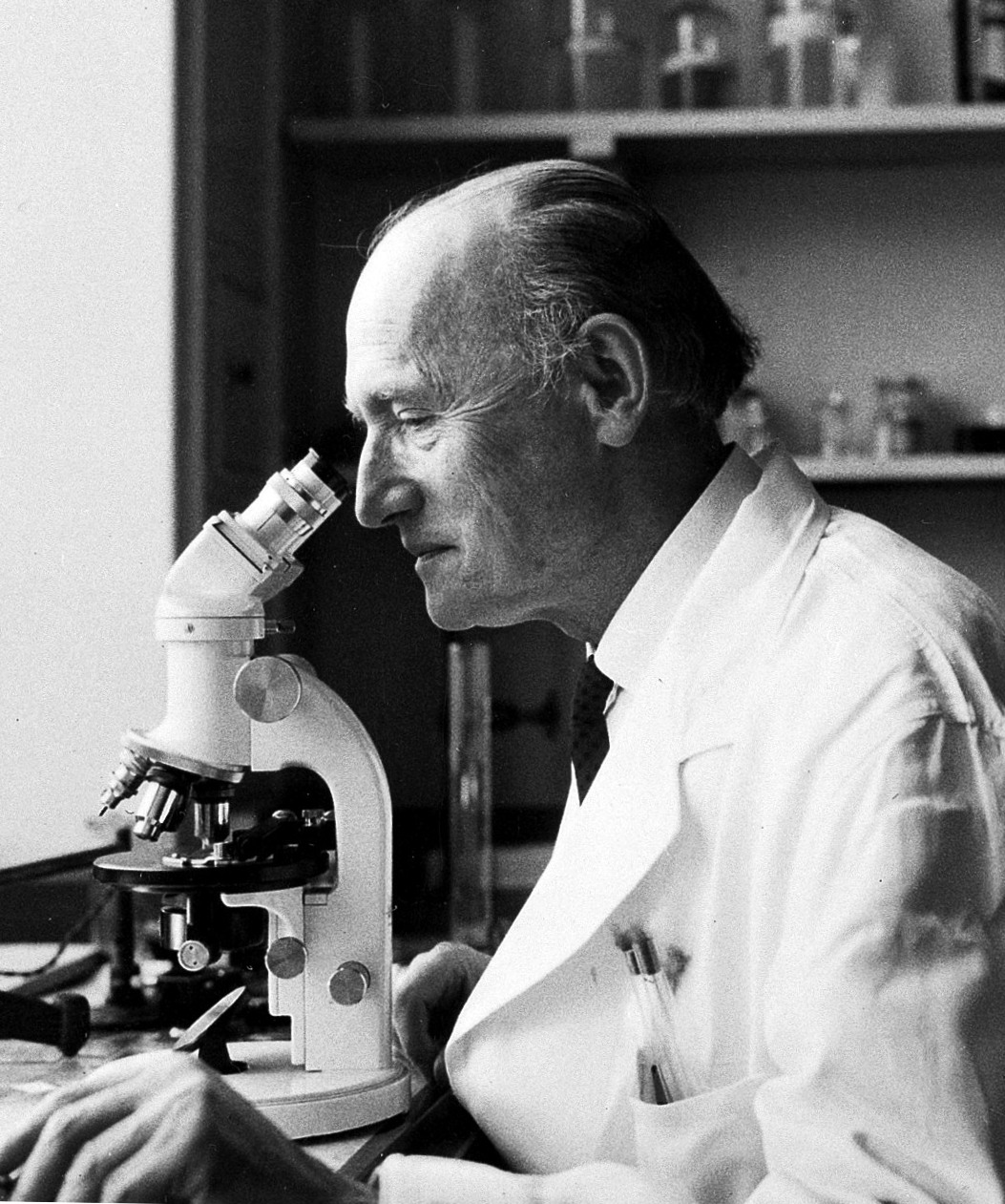
- Born: Percy Cyril Claude Garnham; 15 January 1901; London, England
- Died: 25 December 1994 (aged 93)
- Education: St Bartholomew's Hospital, London
- Known for: Malaria
- Spouse: Esther Long Price
- Children: 6
- Awards: Manson Medal (1965); Linnean Medal (1986)
- Scientific career
- Fields: Malarial parasitology
- Workplaces: London School of Hygiene & Tropical Medicine

Percy Cyril Claude Garnham CMG FRS (15 January 1901 – 25 December 1994), was a British biologist and parasitologist. On his 90th birthday, he was called the "greatest living parasitologist".

== Early life and education ==
Garnham was born in London, the son of Percy Claude Garnham (1875–1915), and Edith née Masham (1878–1951), an accomplished violinist. In World War I, his father served as a lieutenant in the Royal Navy and died at Gallipoli in 1915. He was educated at Paradise School and St Bartholomew's Hospital, London, and graduated in medicine in 1925. followed by a diploma in public health. In 1928 he was awarded an MD degree by the University of London for his work on malaria in Kenya and also a Gold Medal.

== Career ==
Garnham's career started in 1925 as a member of the British Colonial Medical Service in Kenya. This introduced him to a very wide range of tropical diseases of humans and animals and their vectors as he worked on identification and control. It also brought him into contact with local and international experts. These included Alwen M. Evans, an expert on mosquitoes and with whom he co authored work on the distribution of the Anopheles funestus group around the city of Kisumu and the coast. His research began to focus on malaria. Garnham became the Malaria Research Officer and then Director of the new Division of Insect Borne Diseases in Nairobi.

In 1947 he was appointed as a Reader at the London School of Hygiene and Tropical Medicine. The following year, working with Henry Shortt, he identified the stage of the malaria parasite within the liver where it changes from the sporozoite to merozoite form. The parasite has a complex lifecycle, adopting different forms to best exploit the animal or human tissues that it finds itself within. In 1952 he was promoted to the Chair of Protozoology and later became Head of the Department of Parasitology. He supervised many doctoral students who came from many different countries. His book Malaria Parasites and other Haemosporidia (1966) was an up-to-date account of malaria parasites and their relatives from humans, animals and birds, focusing on their morphology. It brought together a very large amount of information systematically but had a rather mixed reception.

He officially retired in 1968 but continued to work for 12 years as a senior research fellow at Imperial College based at Silwood Park. This included organising an expedition in 1972 to Borneo to rediscover Plasmodium pitheci. The expedition also discovered the new species Plasmodium silvaticum. He also collected and organised, in collaboration with A. J. Duggan, many malaria parasites. He retired again in 1979.

== Publications ==
Garnham was the author or co-author of over 400 books, scientific papers and reports. The most significant include:

- C. P. P. Garnham (1966) Malaria Parasites and Other Haemosporidia, Blackwell Scientific Publications, Oxford. pp 1114.

== Awards and honours ==
In March 1964 Garnham was elected a Fellow of the Royal Society. He was also made a Companion of the Most Distinguished Order of St Michael and St George.

In 1965, Garnham was awarded the Royal Society of Tropical Medicine and Hygiene's Manson Medal, named in honour of Sir Patrick Manson. It is the RSTMH's highest honour and awarded triennially.

A total of 21 parasites and vectors have been named after him.

== Personal life ==
In 1924, he married Esther Long Price; they had two sons and four daughters. He was a keen pianist, including having a baby grand piano while he was in Kenya. During his retirement he worked on a biography of Edgar Allan Poe until shortly before his death in 1994.

== Legacy ==
His papers are held in the archives of the London School of Hygiene and Tropical Medicine. His collection of over a thousand malaria parasite specimens, including some type specimens, is held at the Natural History Museum, London.
