= List of London School of Hygiene and Tropical Medicine people =

This is a list of London School of Hygiene & Tropical Medicine people, including former students and members of faculty.

== Notable alumni ==
Notable alumni of the school include:

- Hutton Ayikwei Addy
- Abraham Manie Adelstein
- Tedros Adhanom, director-general of the World Health Organisation
- Dlawer Ala'Aldeen
- Pedro L. Alonso
- Anne Alvik
- John Ashton
- Nils Bejerot
- Bhagvatsinhji
- Gilbert Bukenya
- Colin Butler
- Sarah Cleaveland
- Matilda J. Clerk
- Archie Cochrane
- Cheryl Cohen
- Alejandro Cravioto
- John Crump
- Sarah Darby
- Jocelyn DeJong
- Philip James Edwards
- Helen Epstein
- Carissa F. Etienne
- Marie-Claire Faray, women's rights activist
- Josep Figueras
- John Frank
- Innocent Gangaidzo
- Alan Powell Goffe
- Brendon Gooneratne
- Helen Gregory (medical missionary)
- Habibollah Hedayat
- Janet Hemingway, parasitologist, professor of Insect Molecular Biology and director of the Liverpool School of Tropical Medicine
- David L. Heymann
- Robert Holdstock
- Harry Hoogstraal
- Honoria Somerville Keer
- Maria Van Kerkhove
- Vanessa Kerry
- Kay-Tee Khaw, professor of Clinical Gerontology at the University of Cambridge
- Philip J. Landrigan
- James Lovelock
- Robert W. McCollum
- Carlos Monge Medrano
- J. Donald Millar
- Eduardo Missoni
- Matshidiso Moeti
- Mosa Moshabela
- Samantha Nutt
- Stella Nyanzi
- Muhammad Ali Pate
- Elizabeth Pisani
- Max Price
- Pamela Rendi-Wagner
- Nesta Rugumayo
- Eli Schwartz
- Fernando Simón
- V. Sivalingam
- Ahmad Teebi (DHCG 1983)
- Anders Tegnell
- Gertrud Theiler
- Max Theiler
- Nahid Toubia
- Jim van Os
- Diana Walford
- Kenneth S. Warren
- Simon Wessely
- Franklin White
- Chris Whitty
- Alimuddin Zumla
- Libertina Amathila

== Notable current and former academic staff ==
- Donald Acheson
- Abraham Manie Adelstein
- Elizabeth Anionwu
- Peter Armitage
- Andrew Balfour
- Kazem Behbehani
- Val Beral
- Claire Bertschinger
- Beulah Bewley
- William Brass
- Sandy Cairncross
- James Cantlie
- Geoffrey Douglas Hale Carpenter
- Aldo Castellani
- Havelock Charles
- David Clayton
- Liz Corbett
- Val Curtis
- Hazel Dockrell
- Christopher Dye
- David Evans
- Neil Hamilton Fairley
- Richard Feachem
- David Flavell
- John Fox
- Clare Gilbert
- Ben Goldacre
- Brian Greenwood
- Major Greenwood
- Emily Grundy
- Andrew Haines
- Michael Healy
- Austin Bradford Hill
- Joseph Oscar Irwin
- Wilson Jameson
- Robert Leiper
- George Carmichael Low
- Patrick Manson
- Michael Marmot
- Carl R. May
- Archibald McIndoe
- Martin McKee
- Tony McMichael
- Anne Mills
- David Morley
- Jerry Morris
- David Nabarro
- S. Jay Olshansky
- Vikram Patel
- Julian Peto
- Peter Pharoah
- Peter Piot
- Stuart Pocock
- Anne Marie Rafferty
- Geoffrey Rose
- John Alexander Sinton
- Peter Smith
- Fiona Stanley
- Charlotte Watts
- Chris Whitty
- Vincent Wigglesworth
- John "Jack" P. Woodall

== Deans and directors ==
- Sir Francis Lovell, dean of London School of Tropical Medicine 1903–1916
- Sir Havelock Charles, dean of the London School of Tropical Medicine 1916–1924
- Sir Andrew Balfour, director 1923–1931
- Wilson Jameson, 1931–1940
- 1939 to 1945 – successive changes of dean because of wartime commitments of Wilson Jameson and Brigadier Parkinson
- J. M. Mackintosh, January 1945–1950
- Andrew Topping, 1950–1955
- Austin Bradford Hill, 1955–1957
- James Kilpatrick, 1957–1960
- E. T. C. Spooner, 1960–1970
- C. E. Gordon Smith, 1970–1989
- Richard Feachem, 1989–1995
- B. S. Drasar, acting during 1995
- Harrison Spencer, 1996–2000
- Geoffrey Targett, acting during 2000
- Sir Andrew Haines, 2001–2010
- Peter Piot, 2010–
