= Martin McKee =

Professor of public health (born 1956)

Martin McKee CBE
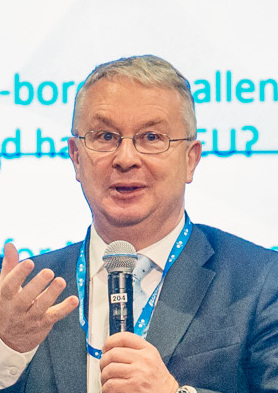
- McKee in 2017
- Born: Clifford Martin McKee; 12 July 1956 (age 70)
- Education: Royal Belfast Academical Institution
- Scientific career
- Workplaces: London School of Hygiene & Tropical Medicine
- Notable students: Helena Legido-Quigley

Clifford Martin McKee, CBE (born 12 July 1956), is professor of European public health at the London School of Hygiene and Tropical Medicine.

== Biography ==
He was educated at the Royal Belfast Academical Institution and trained as a doctor at The Queen's University of Belfast, qualifying in 1979 and specialized initially in internal medicine at the Belfast City Hospital and the Royal Victoria Hospital between 1979 and 1985, before moving into public health. McKee currently lives in London with his wife Dorothy and two daughters.

== Professional career ==
McKee created the European Centre on Health of Societies in Transition in 1997 with Professor David Leon, a WHO Collaborating Centre comprising a team of researchers working primarily on health and health policy in central and eastern Europe and the former Soviet Union. He is also research director of the European Observatory on Health Systems and Policies, a partnership of universities, national and regional governments, international agencies and was President of the European Public Health Association between 2014 and 2016. In September 2021 he was elected as President Elect of the British Medical Association. He has published over 1300 scientific papers and 50 books, was an editor of the European Journal of Public Health for 15 years. He is a member of the Academia Europaea.

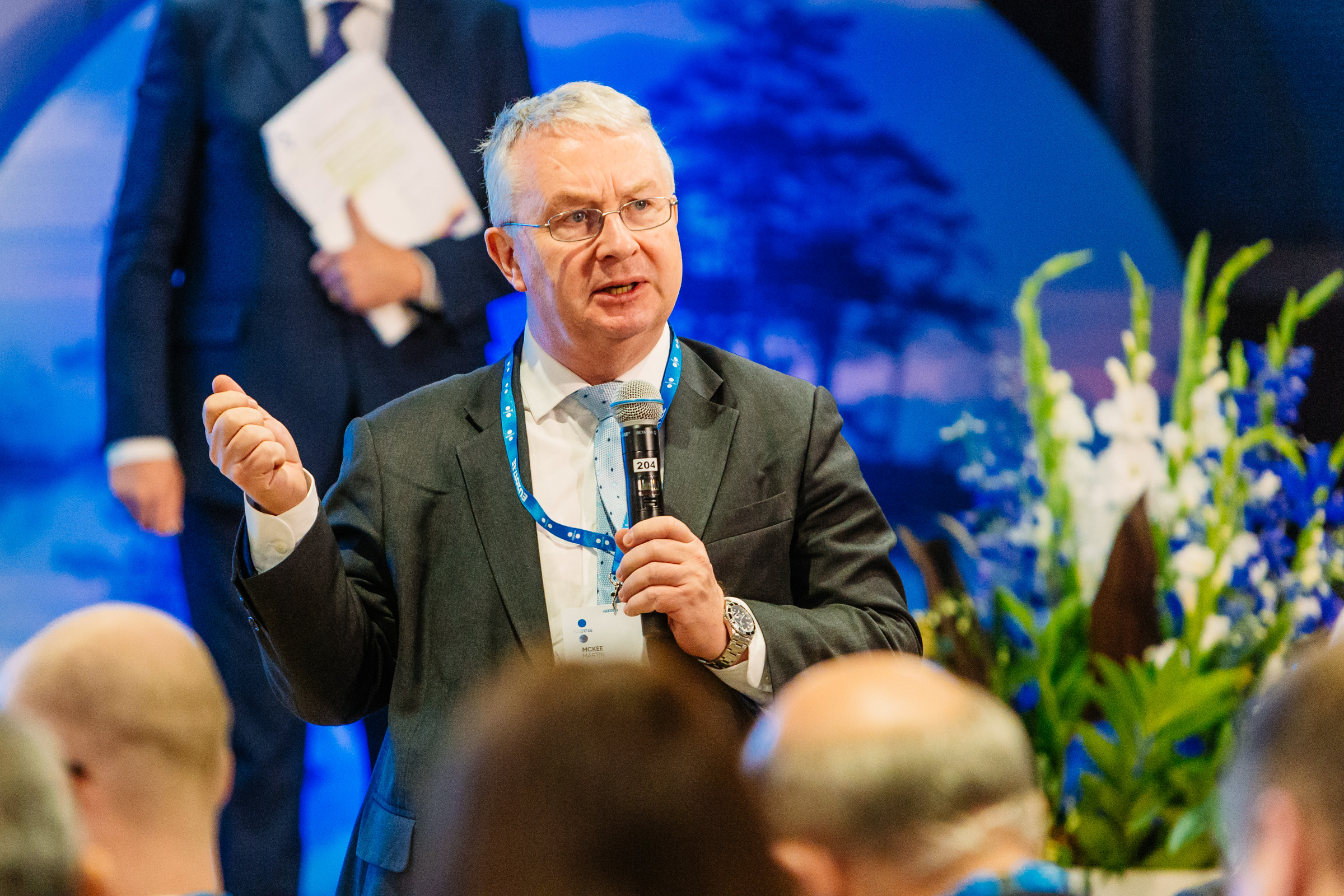
Martin McKee (2017).

== Research ==
Appointed to a senior lecturer post in 1989 with responsibility for developing a program of research in Europe, he was immediately confronted with two major changes: the collapse of the communist regimes in central and eastern Europe and, later, in the USSR, and the removal of borders within the expanding European Union. He has led major programs on both issues. With his colleagues Professor David Leon and Vladimir Shkolnikov, he has contributed important new insights into the adverse health consequences of rapid social and political transition, the entry of the international tobacco corporations into these new markets, and the role of alcohol, and especially substances such as aftershaves (odekolon) in the high levels of premature mortality seen in this region. More recently, his work on social change has extended into a large body of research on the health effects of the post-2008 financial crisis, jointly with Dr David Stuckler. His research on the European Union has included books and articles on the impact of European law on health and health policy, European research policy, and cross-border mobility of patients. In 2013 he led a Lancet series on health in Europe. In 2016 he co-founded Healthier IN the EU, a grassroots campaign making the health case for continued UK membership of the European Union.

With colleagues Josep Figueras, Elias Mossialos, and Richard Saltman, he established the European Observatory on Health Systems and Policies.

In 2025, McKee co-authored an open letter published in The Lancet that advocated for continued and strengthened support for the World Health Organization. The letter was signed by 479 global health experts.

== Policy involvement ==
When Lord Darzi proposed the establishment of Polyclinics in England McKee wrote a paper with Bernd Rechel of the London School of Hygiene and Tropical Medicine in which they observed:

Polyclinics were a centrepiece of the Soviet model of healthcare delivery, but many countries of Central and Eastern Europe have abandoned them over the past two decades in favour of a system of general practice that draws extensively on the British model. Advisers from the World Bank, the EU, and many bilateral donors agreed that the polyclinic had failed to deliver modern, integrated health care and saw general practices as the future.

His involvement in the article Why has mortality in England and Wales been increasing?, written with Danny Dorling and others generated considerable publicity. The article suggested that the most likely reason for increased mortality among old people in England and Wales in 2015 was the application of austerity policies, saying that "the evidence points to a major failure of the health system, possibly exacerbated by failings in social care".

McKee has been a critic of the NHS reforms introduced by the UK's coalition government in 2012, arguing that they were unworkable and would lead to fragmentation and confusion. In January 2014 he said that continuing health inequalities among London boroughs was a scandal and that coalition reforms had left it unclear who was supposed to analyse health data and tackle the problems highlighted.

In 2020, McKee was appointed by the World Health Organization's Regional Office for Europe to serve as a member and chair of its scientific committee of the Pan-European Commission on Health and Sustainable Development, chaired by Mario Monti. He and the colleagues then published "Drawing light from the pandemic: A new strategy for health and sustainable development: A Review of the Evidence"

== Honours and awards ==
McKee has received honorary doctorates from the universities of Debrecen (Hungary), Maastricht (The Netherlands), Karlstad (Sweden), Queen's (Belfast), Athens School of Public Health (Greece) and the Nordic School of Public Health. He has been elected to the UK Academy of Medical Sciences and the US National Academy of Medicine. He was made a Commander of the Most Excellent Order of the British Empire (CBE) by HM Queen Elizabeth II for services to health in the 2005 Birthday Honours. He was elected president of the British Medical Association for 2022-3.

== Publications ==
=== Articles ===
- See Pubmed

=== Books ===
- Pascal Diethelm and Martin McKee, Lifting the Smokescreen: Tobacco industry strategy to defeat smoke free policies and legislation, European Respiratory Society and French National Cancer Institute, 2006.
