= Public health observatory =

A public health observatory is an organization or program that monitors and reports on the public health of a particular region or topic in order to inform health policy. Depending on the geographical area or focus of work, it may also be called a "regional health observatory", "urban health observatory", or "national health observatory".

In 2016, a study in the European Journal of Public Health catalogued at least 150 public health observatories worldwide, and that their main functions were reporting on health, performing data analysis, and supporting evidence-based decision-making. A public health observatory does not generate primary data itself, and instead focuses on synthesizing and collecting existing data.

Environmental health, diet, recreation, outdoor education, exercise and other concerns are explored by some public health observatories.

== Examples ==
=== International ===
- The Global Health Observatory, established and operated by the World Health Organization (WHO).
- The Integrated African Health Observatory, also established and operated by the WHO.
- The European Observatory on Health Systems and Policies in Brussels.

=== Brazil ===
- The Observatory of Climate and Health (Observatório de Clima e Saúde) in Rio de Janeiro combines the monitoring of public health with monitoring of climate change and its effects.

=== France ===
The term observatoire is used in French (and has been since at least 1976) to denote any institution that compiles and presents data on a particular subject or for a particular area, generally established so that local or regional policymakers can make decisions with access to interpreted data appropriate to the scope of their geographical area. A survey in 1999 recorded that there were over 500 different observatories at the local, regional, and national levels, focusing on a variety of topics.

- The National Federation of Regional Health Observatories (FNORS - Fédération nationale des observatoires régionaux de la santé) has 16 member regional health observatories, or ORS (Observatoire regional de santé).
- The first public health observatory in France, established in 1974, is the Regional Observatory of Health of Île-de-France (ORS d’Ile-de-France) in Paris. It is a member of FNORS.
- The Regional Observatory of Health for Provence-Alpes-Côte d'Azur in Marseille is a fully independent ORS.

=== Switzerland ===
- The Swiss Health Observatory (Obsan) in Neuchâtel is a joint project of the Swiss Federal Department of Home Affairs and the Conference of Cantonal Health Directors.

=== United Kingdom ===
From 1999 until 2013, there was a network of public health observatories in England until they were absorbed into Public Health England, which was itself moved into the UK Health Security Agency in 2021. There are currently operating health observatories in Wales and Scotland; there was at some point one in Ireland.

There are and were also some topic-specific observatories, such as the Child and Maternal Health Intelligence Network (ChiMat), still operating as of 2021; the Injury Observatory for Britain and Ireland (IOBI), the Mental Health Observatory, and the National Obesity Observatory are all no longer in operation.

The London Health Observatory pioneered methods in measuring social capital and how this affects healing and health in general.
