= Philip Edwards =

Philip or Phil Edwards may refer to:

- Philip Edwards (academic) (1923–2015), British literary scholar
- Phil Edwards (boxer) (born 1936), Welsh boxer
- Philip Edwards (cricketer) (1906–1987), English cricketer active 1930–1933
- Phil Edwards (cricketer) (born 1984), English cricketer
- Phil Edwards (cyclist) (1949–2017), British road racing cyclist
- Phil Edwards (footballer) (born 1985), English footballer
- Phillip Edwards (Royal Navy officer) (1927–2014), British admiral
- Phil Edwards (runner) (1907–1971), Canadian and Guyanese track and field athlete
- Phil Edwards (statistician), British statistician, epidemiologist and academic
- Phil Edwards (surfer) (born 1938), surfer
- Philip Leget Edwards (1812–1869), American educator
