= Elizabeth A. Spencer =

British epidemiologist

Elizabeth A. Spencer is a British epidemiologist and researcher at the Centre for Evidence-Based Medicine (CEBM), University of Oxford, whose research focuses on systematic reviews, multimorbidity, and evidence synthesis.

== Career ==
Spencer’s research spans areas of public health including living reviews, biomarkers, self-care in chronic conditions, and the impact of environmental exposures on health. She has advanced strategies for managing multimorbidity. She has also enhanced methodologies in evidence synthesis, emphasising well-defined research questions, transparent methodologies, and comprehensive search strategies.

At the Centre for Evidence-Based Medicine (CEBM), Spencer is a major contributor to the Evidence-Based Multimorbidity Project. This initiative focuses on developing strategies for the early recognition, screening, and treatment of multimorbidity, aiming to reduce the burden of chronic conditions.

She has been involved in studies at CEBM including "Tamiflu as a Treatment for Influenza," evaluating its efficacy in combating influenza and "Primodos and Congenital Malformations," which investigated the potential links between the hormonal pregnancy test and birth defects. In addition, she has contributed to "Green Tea and Blood Pressure Effects," which examined the potential benefits of green tea consumption on blood pressure and "Transmission of SARS-CoV-2," a study that focused on understanding the transmission dynamics of the virus, particularly among asymptomatic and pre-symptomatic individuals.

Spencer was also involved in the launch of Open Evidence Reviews, an initiative by CEBM providing real-time updates on evidence related to COVID-19. This initiative addressed critical areas such as transmission dynamics, the effectiveness of public health interventions, and the role of PCR cycle thresholds in predicting infectiousness. Her additional research suggests that PCR cycle threshold values may be crucial in predicting the infectiousness of asymptomatic or pre-symptomatic individuals with COVID-19. This study, part of a comprehensive review, highlights the importance of PCR testing in understanding transmission dynamics.

She has researched the risks of hormone replacement therapy (HRT) using large-scale databases. She has also contributed to the Million Women Study, a landmark research project investigating the health of women aged 50 and over, with a focus on evaluating the risks and benefits of HRT and other health factors.

== Selected publications ==
- Davey, G. K.; Spencer, E. A.; Appleby, P. N.; Allen, N. E.; Knox, K. H.; Key, T. J. (May 2003). "EPIC-Oxford: Lifestyle characteristics and nutrient intakes in a cohort of 33,883 meat-eaters and 31,546 non-meat-eaters in the UK". Public Health Nutrition. 6 (3): 259–269. doi:10.1079/PHN2002430. PMID 12740075.
- Rosca, EC; Heneghan, C; Spencer, EA; Brassey, J; Plüddemann, A; Onakpoya, IJ; Evans, D; Conly, JM; Jefferson, T (2022). "Transmission of SARS-CoV-2 Associated with Cruise Ship Travel: A Systematic Review". Trop Med Infect Dis. 7 (10): 290. doi:10.3390/tropicalmed7100290. PMC 9610645. PMID 36288031.
- Rosca, EC; Heneghan, C; Spencer, EA; Plüddemann, A; Maltoni, S; Gandini, S; Onakpoya, IJ; Evans, D; Conly, JM; Jefferson, T (2023). "Coinfection with Strongyloides and SARS-CoV-2: A Systematic Review". Trop Med Infect Dis. 8 (5): 248. doi:10.3390/tropicalmed8050248. PMC 10224069. PMID 37235296.
