= Eupha =

Eupha may refer to:

- Eupha, horticultural trade name of the genus Eulophia
- EUPHA, European Public Health Association
