= Helena Legido-Quigley =

Spanish public health researcher

- Born: 1977 (age 48–49); Barcelona
- Education: University of Barcelona; University of Reading; University of Edinburgh; London School of Hygiene & Tropical Medicine
- Scientific career
- Workplaces: London School of Hygiene & Tropical Medicine; Saw Swee Hock School of Public Health
- Doctoral advisor: Martin McKee

Helena Legido-Quigley (born 1977) is a Spanish public health researcher who is an associate professor in Health Systems at Saw Swee Hock School of Public Health at the National University of Singapore. She serves as an associate fellow of Chatham House and is a member of the Council of the World Economic Forum. She is editor-in-chief of BMJ Public Health and Elsevier's Journal of Migration and Health.

== Early life and education ==
Legido-Quigley is one of five daughters. She grew up in Barcelona. Legido-Quigley started her undergraduate studies in the Department of Sociology at the University of Barcelona. She moved to the United Kingdom and continued her bachelor's degree at the University of Reading. After graduating, Legido-Quigley started a master's course in social policy at the University of Edinburgh. In the early 2000s Legido-Quigley volunteered in South Africa, where she worked to support maternal health. She has said that this experience inspired her to work in global health. On her return to the United Kingdom, Legido-Quigley started a doctoral degree at the London School of Hygiene & Tropical Medicine under the supervision of Martin McKee. As part of her research, she analysed the impact of austerity on the health of people in Spain. At the LSHTM she worked with Peter Piot, then Director of the London School of Hygiene & Tropical Medicine, to understand the policy impacts of public health research.

== Research and career ==
In 2002 Legido-Quigley joined the University of Manchester Institute for Development Policy and Management. She returned to the London School of Hygiene & Tropical Medicine in 2004, where she worked as a research fellow in the Department of Health Services. In 2012 she was appointed a Lecturer in Global Health. Legido-Quigley joined the Saw Swee Hock School of Public Health in Singapore as an associate professor.

In addition to her academic work, Legido-Quigley is a member of the Council of the World Economic Forum and the Commission for Universal Health convened by Chatham House since 2022.

Legido-Quigley has argued that the barriers that migrants face to accessing healthcare are detrimental to their host countries, and called for governments to enhance their healthcare systems rather than turning people in need away.

In 2019 Legido-Quigley analysed the gender and ethnic diversity of public health universities. As part of her analysis, she found that whilst across all levels of academic positions the proportion of men and women were equal, men were overrepresented in senior positions and women overrepresented in junior positions. She found that ethnic minorities were considerably less likely to progress through an academic career than their white counterparts.

=== Leadership on coronavirus disease ===
During the COVID-19 pandemic, Legido-Quigley contributed to and analysed the global public health response to coronavirus disease, and made use of social media to share information with the public. She has said that she was impressed by how quickly Singapore responded to SARS-CoV-2, which was likely informed by their experiences with the SARS epidemic years before. Singapore's healthcare inequality was highlighted when a second wave of infections hit the island, spread by migrant workers. Legido-Quigley worked to analyse the public health responses of different countries, looking to establish best practise and better inform future strategies. She has said that austerity and long-term underinvestment in health services has drained the ability of healthcare systems to respond to SARS-CoV-2. Writing in The Lancet, Legido-Quigley analysed the building blocks of effective healthcare systems; and said that they included governance, financing, delivery, health workers and information. She said that to contain outbreaks of SARS-CoV-2, governments would have to invest in testing, hospitals and their health workers. She called for more clear guidance from the European Union on how to count the number of people who die of coronavirus disease, as not all nations were using the same methodology, making comparisons of the public health response difficult. Legido-Quigley was also involved with analysis of the economic impacts of the COVID-19 pandemic in Asia and Europe.

She serves as editor-in-chief of Elsevier's Journal of Migration and Health.

== Selected publications ==
- Piot, Peter. Abdool Karim, Salim S. Hecht, Robert. Legido-Quigley, Helena. Buse, Kent. Stover, John. Resch, Stephen. Ryckman, Theresa. Møgedal, Sigrun. Dybul, Mark. Goosby, Eric. Watts, Charlotte. Kilonzo, Nduku. McManus, Joanne. Sidibé, Michel. Defeating AIDS--advancing global health. OCLC 1051818416.
- Assuring the quality of health care in the European Union: a case for action. Legido-Quigley, Helena., World Health Organization., European Observatory on Health Systems and Policies., Sixth Framework Programme (European Commission). Copenhagen: World Health Organization. 2008. ISBN 978-92-890-7194-9. OCLC 373548414.
- Legido-Quigley, Helena; Otero, Laura; Parra, Daniel la; Alvarez-Dardet, Carlos; Martin-Moreno, Jose M.; McKee, Martin (2013-06-13). "Will austerity cuts dismantle the Spanish healthcare system?". BMJ. 346 f2363. doi:10.1136/bmj.f2363. hdl:10045/33768. ISSN 1756-1833. PMID 23766463. S2CID 19581381.
