= Michael Shepherd (psychiatrist) =

British psychiatrist (1923–1995)

- Born: 30 July 1923; Cardiff, Wales
- Died: 21 August 1995 (aged 72); London, England
- Education: Oxford University
- Occupations: Psychiatrist, author
- Known for: Altering the course of psychiatric care in Britain; Epidemiological psychiatry; The creation of the journal Psychological Medicine
- Spouse: Margaret Rock
- Children: 4

Michael Shepherd (30 July 1923 – 21 August 1995) was a British psychiatrist, Professor of Epidemiological Psychiatry at the Institute of Psychiatry (King's College London), and a consultant psychiatrist at the Maudsley Hospital, London. He was the author of numerous publications in the field of psychiatry.

== Early life ==
Michael Shepherd was born on July 30, 1923, in Cardiff, into a Jewish family with roots in Odessa and Poland. He attended Cardiff High School and studied medicine at the Medical School of Oxford University and the Radcliffe Infirmary. Shepherd studied under John Ryle, a professor of Social medicine. As part of Ryle's teaching, Shepherd was asked to visit a patient at her home in Cowley to learn about the socio-medical significance of cardiac invalidism. These experiences contributed to Shepherd’s interest in exploring the social factors influencing mental disorders through systematic research. After graduating, Shepherd conducted home appointments with patients and joined the Royal Air Force to complete his National Service.

== Career ==
Shepherd began his career in psychiatry at The Maudsley Hospital in 1947. In 1954, he obtained his Doctorate in Medicine from Oxford University with a thesis studying the pattern of major psychoses in the county of Buckinghamshire during two periods, 1931–33 and 1945–47. In 1956, he joined the staff of the Institute of Psychiatry as a Senior Lecturer and was appointed to the institute's Readership in Psychiatry in 1961. In 1967, he was awarded a personal chair of epidemiological psychiatry. He became a Fellow of the Royal College of Physicians in 1970 and a Foundation Fellow of the Royal College of Psychiatrists in 1971. He established the General Practice Research Unit at the Institute of Psychiatry in the late 1950s and directed its activities until his retirement in 1988. He was also the founding editor of the journal Psychological Medicine and was appointed a CBE in 1989. During his career, he also became a Fellow of both the American Public Health Association and the American Psychological Association.

Shepherd was influenced during his early years at The Maudsley by Aubrey Lewis, who advocated for psychiatrists to collect social data, rather than limiting their work to the clinical study of individual patients. Shepherd's professional relationship with Lewis led to his documentation of Lewis' legacy to psychiatry in his biographies. With the exception of a year at the School of Public Health at Johns Hopkins University, Baltimore, in 1955–56, Shepherd remained at The Maudsley for his entire professional career.

=== Role of GPs in the treatment of psychiatric disorders ===
Shepherd focused attention on the role of the National Health Service general practitioner in the treatment of patients with minor psychiatric illnesses, through the General Practice Research Unit which he established under the auspices of the Department of Health and Social Security. In 1986 the Chief Medical Officer of the Department of Health and Social Security wrote:

"Within the structure of the National Health Service, the medical responsibility for the care of (emotionally disturbed) patients falls principally on the general practitioner."

He acknowledged Shepherd's contribution in clarifying the nature and extent of these disorders and stated that the findings of his research had implications for the organisation of medical services in the Britain and for medical education. This contrasted with the opinion two decades earlier when the medical correspondent of The Times (summarising an article in The Practitioner) stated that "the optimal management of neurotic patients by their general practitioners is not possible under the National Health Service" due to the time it would take.

Shepherd's research resulted in closer scrutiny of the needs of patients encountered in general practice with psychological disorders and contributed to an increase in the personnel composing the professional team in primary care. Shepherd's work Psychiatric Illness in General Practice (1966) influenced this area of mental health research. It has been suggested that the resources available to psychiatrists remained stagnant while acute and serious cases of mental disorders are referred to them. Shepherd's view that mental health services could be enhanced by better training and support for GPs rather than a proliferation of psychiatrists was not universally supported by his psychiatric colleagues, but it has been endorsed by the Chief Medical Officer, World Health Organization declarations, and is part of Government strategy documents, including the 1992 publication, "The Health of the Nation".

=== Clinician ===
Shepherd's clinical study on the symptoms of morbid jealousy led him to conclude that a medical opinion is of most value when the interpersonal and social aspects of a case are understood as closely as the issue of diagnosis. He applied these precepts to psychiatric disorders and became less concerned with the minutiae of clinical or experimental research, delegating the work to his team. As a clinician, Shepherd's style has been described as "unusual". He continued to be involved in clinical work until his retirement, although day-to-day management of his patients was delegated. His detachment was described as "Olympian" and was captured by a former patient:

"a tall dark pale man, with a chillingly superior glance and quellingly English voice made another appointment to see me. I knew that if anyone could discover the 'truth' it would be he alone or with his colleagues."

=== Tackling conceptual issues in psychiatry ===
He wrote on psychiatric classifications, psychopathology, and the causation of mental disorders, contributing to defining and clarifying conceptual issues within psychiatry. In his 1987 article on the Formulation of New Research Strategies on Schizophrenia,, he concluded that the most persistent obstacle remained the reliable identification of schizophrenia and instigated moves towards obtaining international agreement for its definition in a communicable form. He wrote on the general psychopathology of Karl Jaspers, believing that the appeal of Jaspers' book was its breadth, extending the field of general psychopathology from the natural sciences, via phenomenology, to existentialist philosophy. He believed that psychopathology had to be explored not only through biological science but also through an analysis of what belongs to Man. While Jaspers' book is recognized as influential, it lacks a clear definition of psychopathology. Shepherd addressed this weakness by promoting the work among English-speaking psychiatrists through his essays and by instituting a course of seminars on psychopathology for doctors training in psychiatry at the Maudsley Hospital in the late 1950s.

=== Biographical essays ===
Shepherd used biographical essays to reveal his personal philosophy and leanings in psychiatry, focusing on the achievements of people he admired, including John Ryle, Aubrey Lewis, and Jean Starobinski. In particular, Shepherd revered Lewis, whom he called a "Representative Psychiatrist". Kenneth Rawnsley suggested that he identified in his mentor the qualities that he aspired to himself: intellectual integrity, scholarship, a vast range of knowledge, and a capacity for juridical thought.

=== Hammer of Psychoanalysis ===
Shepherd was described by colleagues as the "Hammer of Psychoanalysis", although he was not antipathetic towards its use. In his essay entitled "Sherlock Holmes and the case of Dr Freud", he compared the Sherlock Holmes method of drawing inferences from clues with Freud's analytic method for examining the human mind, concluding that the method is intuitive and devoid of logic. He coined the term "mythod" to describe their method embedded in a myth, devoid of scientific value, and conceded that psychoanalysis might have some value as a metaphor, but challenged it as a scientific discipline.

=== Founding editor of Psychological Medicine ===
During his career, Shepherd wrote and co-authored over 30 books and around 200 original articles, including the five volumes of the Handbook of Psychiatry. He established the journal Psychological Medicine, which described as "arguably the finest psychiatric journal in the English-speaking world". He was the founding editor of Psychological Medicine from 1969 until 1993. He favored the term "Psychological Medicine" over "Psychiatry", and attached importance to the title, which he resurrected from the Journal of Psychological Medicine, first conceived by Forbes Winslow. He defined psychological medicine as including psychiatry and the study of abnormal behavior from the medical point of view and aimed to concentrate on original, high-quality work across psychiatry and its allied disciplines, investing time and care towards its success. According to his successor, Psychological Medicine was considered "perhaps his greatest and most enduring creation, set in an academic and research career that was already distinguished".

=== Teacher ===
As a teacher, he shunned didactic teaching in favor of the Socratic method of teaching. He was not aligned with the Freudian movement.

== Honors and awards ==
Michael Shepherd received the following professional recognition:

- Donald Reid Medal for Epidemiology in 1982.
- Rema Lapouse Award of the American Public Health Association in 1983.

He was honored with:

- CBE in 1989.
- Honorary Fellowship of the Royal College of Psychiatrists in 1990.
- Honorary Fellowship of the Royal Society of Medicine in 1995 shortly before his death.

== Family and personal life ==
Shepherd was described as an entertaining companion with a breadth of knowledge, with interests ranging from ballet to rugby football. He took an interest in the personal lives and backgrounds of those with whom he worked. He was described as a cultured man, well-versed in literature and fluent in several languages. He married Margaret Rock, a school teacher, in 1947, and they had four children: two daughters, Catherine and Lucy, and two sons, Simon and Daniel. They raised their children in West Dulwich, south London, a short distance from Maudsley Hospital. He was affected by the death of his wife after an illness in 1992 and withdrew from public appearances. At the time of Michael Shepherd's death on 21 August 1995, he had two grandsons; his first granddaughter was born a few days after his death.

== Publications ==
- A Study of the Major Psychoses in an English County, 1957;
- Psychiatric Illness in General Practice, 1966, London: Oxford University Press;
- (et al.) An experimental approach to psychiatric diagnosis, Acta Psychiatrica Scandinavica, 210. Suppl, 1968;
- Psychotropic Drugs in Psychiatry, 1981;
- Handbook of Psychiatry, 1982;
- Psychiatrists on Psychiatry, 1983;
- The Anatomy of Madness, 1985 (co-editor with William Bynum and Roy Porter);
- Sherlock Holmes and the Case of Dr Freud, 1985;
- A representative psychiatrist: the career, contributions and legacies of Sir Aubrey Lewis, Psychological Medicine Supplement 10. Cambridge: Cambridge University Press, 1988;
- Primary care of patients with mental disorder in the community, British Medical Journal, 299. 666–669, 1989
- Conceptual Issues in Psychological Medicine, 1990, London: Tavistock
- Two faces of Kraepelin, British Journal of Psychiatry. 167, 174–183, 1995
