= European Observatory on Health Systems and Policies =

Public health observatory

- Type: Intergovernmental organization
- Purpose: Health policy advice
- Headquarters: WHO European Centre for Health Policy, Brussels, Belgium
- Main organ: the World Health Organization
- Parent organization: WHO Regional Office for Europe
- Website: eurohealthobservatory.who.int

The European Observatory on Health Systems and Policies is a public health observatory established through an intergovernmental partnership, hosted by the World Health Organization (WHO) Regional Office for Europe, which specialises in the development of health systems within Europe.

The partnership includes the Governments of Austria, Belgium, Finland, Ireland, Norway, Slovenia, Sweden and the United Kingdom; the Veneto Region of Italy; the French National Union of Health Insurance Funds (UNCAM); the World Health Organization; the European Commission; the World Bank; the London School of Economics and Political Science (LSE); and the London School of Hygiene & Tropical Medicine (LSHTM). The observatory was established in 1998 by Josep Figueras, with colleagues Martin McKee, Elias Mossialos, and Richard Saltman, when Dr Jo E. Asvall, the then WHO Regional Director for Europe, approved its foundation.

The organization is dedicated to supporting evidence-based health policy-making through the analysis and dissemination of information on European health systems and by engaging directly with national policy-makers in order to promote health gain, solidarity, efficiency, quality, responsiveness, transparency, and integrity. It utilises and compares experiences from across Europe to identify and highlight health issues with the intention of encouraging debate, while assisting European powers in taking evidence-based decisions in order to tackle issues affecting public health. The Observatory is composed of a steering committee, core management team, research policy group and staff. Its secretariat is based in Brussels and has offices in London (at LSE and LSHTM) and Technische Universität Berlin, bringing together a wide range of academics, policy-makers and practitioners to analyse trends in health policies and reforms.

The Observatory aims to shape the course of policy development, relying on national powers to act accordingly with the Observatory's findings, which are published in its comprehensive reviews of health systems (Health Systems in Transition or HiTs). The health system profiles, compiled by the Observatory, cover the 53 member states of WHO European Region and several member countries of the Organisation for Economic Co-operation and Development (OECD). They are used and accessed by a wide international audience interested in comparing European and international health systems and policies. The Observatory recognises the environmental, socio-political and socio-economic influences on health systems and public health, assessing how events such as the recent economic downturn or financial crisis have affected public health across Europe. The Observatory has designed and manages the innovative Health Systems and Policy Monitor platform (HSPM). This platform is a collaborative venture which provides a detailed description of health systems and provides up to date information on reforms and changes that are particularly policy relevant. The platform allows country by country comparisons in key areas of public health.

== Activities ==
=== Health in Transition Series (HiT) ===
HiT health system reviews are reports generally focused on one country. The report is a detailed description of the country's health system, analyzing the health issues the system's ability to deal with them, often outlining reform and policy options available to the policymakers in that country. The series is regularly updated and covers the countries of the WHO European Region as well as some additional OECD countries (the full list of HiTs and their date of publication are available online. The studies are available in an English version and some reports are also available in another official language, mainly Russian.

=== Health Systems and Policy Monitor (HSPM) ===
The Health Systems and Policy Monitor is a platform allowing policy makers, practitioners, and academics to study and understand the changes in national health systems across Europe. It allows the user to extract specific information on European health systems and directly compare the results from different countries.

The platform makes the Observatory's HiT series accessible online, it follows health system changes in real time, as they develop via posts from experts at the Health Systems and Policy Monitor Network. It also provides insights into ongoing health reforms so that HSPM users can identify and understand shifts in policy across the Region. The Observatory also grants access to the Elsevier Health Policy Journal's articles published by HSPM members.

The HSPM platform features rolling updates by its Network members for:

- Belgium (KCE - Belgian Health Care Knowledge Centre)
- Denmark (the University of Copenhagen and University of Southern Denmark)
- France (URC Eco Île-de-France - Unité de recherche clinique en économie de la santé and IRDES- Institute for Research and Information in Health Economics)
- Hungary (Semmelweis University)
- Israel (Myers-JDC-Brookdale Institute's Smokler Centre for Health Policy Research)
- Italy (CERGAS Bocconi University and Universita' Cattolica of Rome)
- Netherlands (NIVEL- Netherlands Institute for health Services Research and University of Maastricht)
- Portugal (Universidade Nova de Lisboa- Nova Business School)
- Slovenia (IVZ- Institute of Public Health of the Republic of Slovenia)
- Spain (SESPAS- Spanish Society of Public Health and Health Management, IACS- Aragon Institute of Health Science and University of Barcelona)
- Sweden (Vårdanalys- Swedish Agency for Health and Care Services Analysis and Lund University)
- United Kingdom/England (The King's Fund)

=== Studies ===
The Observatory's studies cover an extensive range of topics from children's health care to issues surrounding chronic and communicable diseases to the financial constraints on health systems across Europe. Although these studies do not ensure the implementation of new reforms and policies across Europe they are vital in highlighting, explaining and disseminating key data, from which policymakers across Europe can use to make relevant and progressive changes to national health systems.

A few titles include:

- European child health services and systems. Lessons without borders
- Health professional mobility in a changing Europe. New dynamics, mobile individuals and diverse responses
- Boosting innovation and cooperation in European cancer control
- Hospitals and borders. Seven case studies on cross-border collaboration and health system interactions
- Clinical guidelines for chronic conditions in the European Union
- Successes and failures of health policy in Europe. Four decades of divergent trends and converging challenges
- Health in All Policies - Seizing opportunities, implementing policies
- Changing national role in health system governance (The). A case-based study of 11 European countries and Australia
- Health system performance comparison. An agenda for policy, information and research
- Building European reference networks in health care. Exploring concepts and national practices in the European Union
- Home care across Europe. Current structure and future challenges
- Intersectoral governance for health in all policies. Structures, actions and experiences
- Health systems, health, wealth and societal well-being. Assessing the case for investing in health systems
- Governing public hospitals. Reform strategies and the movement towards institutional autonomy
- Migration and health in the European Union
- Diagnosis-related groups in Europe

A full list of the Observatory's studies are available online.

=== Policy Briefs and Summaries ===
The Observatory also publishes specific Policy briefs and summaries. These are small reports catering to the needs of health policymakers and are used to inform them and to provide relevant and available evidence surrounding specific issues. They follow a systematic way of organizing the information and tend to concentrate more on the relevance of certain policies and the implementation of the policy options.

These are some examples of the most recent titles from the Observatory's set of policy briefs and summaries (a full list is available online):

- What is the evidence on the economic effects of integrated care? OBS policy summary 11 (2014)
- Addressing needs in the public health workforce in Europe, OBS policy summary 10 (2014)
- Matching form to function: Designing organizational models to support knowledge brokering in European health systems, OBS policy summary 9 (BRIDGE series) (2013)
- Learning from one another: Enriching interactive knowledge-sharing mechanisms to support knowledge brokering in European health systems, OBS policy summary 8 (BRIDGE series) (2013)
- Communicating clearly: Enhancing information-packaging mechanisms to support knowledge brokering in European health systems, OBS policy summary 7 (BRIDGE series) (2013)
- Promoting health, preventing disease: is there an economic case? OBS policy summary 6 (2013)
- Health policy responses to the financial crisis in Europe, HEN-OBS policy summary 5 (2012)
- Health system performance comparison: an agenda for policy, information, and research, HEN-OBS policy summary 4 (2012)
- Using audit and feedback to health professionals to improve the quality and safety of health care, HEN-OBS policy summary 3 (2010)
