= Psychological Medicine =

- Discipline: Clinical psychology, psychiatry
- Language: English
- Edited by: Kenneth S. Kendler, Robin M. Murray

Publication details
- History: 1969-present
- Publisher: Cambridge University Press
- Frequency: Monthly
- Open access: Hybrid
- Impact factor: 7.723 (2020)

Standard abbreviations
- ISO 4: Psychol. Med.

Indexing
- CODEN: PSMDCO
- ISSN: 0033-2917 (print); 1469-8978 (web)
- OCLC no.: 01588231

Links
- Journal homepage; Online access; Online archive

Psychological Medicine is a peer-reviewed medical journal in the field of psychiatry and related aspects of psychology and basic sciences. According to the Journal Citation Reports, the journal has a 2020 impact factor of 7.723.

== History ==
The journal was established in 1969 by Michael Shepherd, who remained its editor until 1993. For its first five years, the journal was published by the British Medical Association; subsequently, Cambridge University Press assumed publication. Shepherd favoured the term "Psychological Medicine" over "Psychiatry" and he attached great importance to the title which he resurrected from the Journal of Psychological Medicine, first conceived by Forbes Benignus Winslow. He defined psychological medicine as including not only psychiatry, but also the study of abnormal behaviour. He concentrated on original high-quality works across the wide spectrum of both psychiatry and its allied disciplines. Shepherd contributed extensively himself, investing much time and care towards the journal's success. According to his successor, Psychological Medicine was to become perhaps Shepherd's greatest and most enduring creation set in an already highly distinguished academic and research career.

== See also ==
- List of psychiatry journals
