= Jeremiah Stamler =

American cardiologist (1919–2022)

Jeremiah Stamler (October 27, 1919 – January 26, 2022) was an American scientist specializing in preventive cardiology and the study of the influence of various risk factors on coronary heart disease and other cardiovascular diseases, and the role of salt and other nutrients in the etiology of hypertension and coronary heart disease. Stamler is credited with introducing the term "risk factors" into the field of cardiology. In 1988, he was awarded the Donald Reid Medal given by the London School of Hygiene and Tropical Medicine for his contributions to epidemiology. He was professor emeritus of preventive medicine at Northwestern University in Chicago, Illinois. After his retirement from active teaching, he continued his research with his wife Rose until her death in 1998; in his later years he divided his time between Manhattan, Long Island, Chicago, and Pioppi in Southern Italy.

== Early life and education ==
Stamler was born on October 27, 1919, in New York City, the son of George Stamler (a dentist) and Rose Baras Stamler (a former schoolteacher). Both of his parents were Russian Jews, immigrants from Russia. He was raised in West Orange, New Jersey, where the family moved when he was six months old. He attended Columbia University in New York as an undergraduate, and Long Island College Hospital Medical School (now SUNY Downstate Medical Center). Upon graduation, he was inducted into the Army, serving until 1946, when he was honorably discharged with the rank of captain.

== Career ==
Stamler moved to Chicago in 1947, taking a job in cardiovascular research under Louis N. Katz. There he performed laboratory research on interactions of diet, hormones, blood pressure and lipids in experimental models of vascular disease, producing a classic monograph in 1958: Experimental Atherosclerosis. He moved to the Chicago Board of Health in 1958, where he set up the first Heart Disease Control Program (later the Chronic Disease Control Division). In 1972 he was appointed chair of the newly formed Department of Community Health and Preventive Medicine at the Feinberg School of Medicine at Northwestern University. He was succeeded as chair by Philip Greenland in 1991. During the 1970s and 1980s his group took part in observational epidemiologic studies and in multi-center clinical trials of interventions to prevent coronary heart disease. Later he collaborated on international studies of salt, protein, and other nutrients and risk of hypertension. As Emeritus Professor, the "father of preventive cardiology" remained active.

== Honors and awards ==
American Heart Association Award for Outstanding Efforts in Heart Research, 1964; AHA Award of Merit, 1967; AHA Service Award, 1980–81; AHA Research Achievement Award, 1981; AHA Distinguished Achievement Award, 1987; and the AHA's prestigious Gold Heart Award in 1992. The AHA also honored Dr. Stamler in 1990 when the Executive Committee of the Council in Epidemiology established the Jeremiah Stamler, MD New Investigator Award. Other significant honors include a Gold Heart Award from the Chicago Affiliate of the American Heart Association; the Donald Reid Medal from the Joint Committee of the London School of Hygiene and Tropical Medicine and the Royal College of Physicians; the National Cholesterol Award at the First National Cholesterol Conference; the James D. Bruce Memorial Award for Distinguished Contributions in Preventive Medicine from the American College of Physicians.

== HUAC case ==
In 1965, Stamler, a longtime supporter of the civil rights movement for African Americans, was subpoenaed to testify before the House Committee on Un-American Activities (popularly known as HUAC). In response, he filed a suit (joined by co-worker Yolanda Hall, who had also been subpoenaed) seeking to have the committee's Congressional mandate declared unconstitutional, as it would tend to exert a "chilling effect" on the exercise of civil liberties. After the suit was rejected by U. S. District Court judge Julius Hoffman, Dr. Stamler filed an appeal; when the committee hearing began and his turn to testify came up, he cited the pending appeal of his suit and, refusing to testify until the suit had been finally adjudicated, walked out of the hearing. As a result, in 1966 he was cited for contempt of Congress and in 1967 he was indicted on that charge. In 1973, the government agreed to drop the indictment; in turn, Dr. Stamler agreed to drop his civil suit against the committee. HUAC, which had been renamed the House Committee on Internal Security in 1969, was abolished by the House of Representatives in 1975. According to John C. Tucker, "many people believe the Stamler case and a statistical survey prepared for it by University of Chicago law professor Hans Zeisel was the primary reason HUAC was finally disbanded by Congress".

== Personal life ==
Stamler married Rose Steinberg (1922–1998), a sociologist, in 1942; they worked together on cardiovascular research until her death in 1998. They had one son, Paul J. Stamler (b. 1950). In 2004 Stamler married Gloria Brim Beckerman, a childhood friend, the widow of the scholar Bernard Beckerman. Gloria died in April 2021. He turned 100 in October 2019, and died on January 26, 2022, at his home in Sag Harbor, New York. He was 102 years old.
