= Pascal Diethelm =

Swiss econometrician, activist (born 1944)

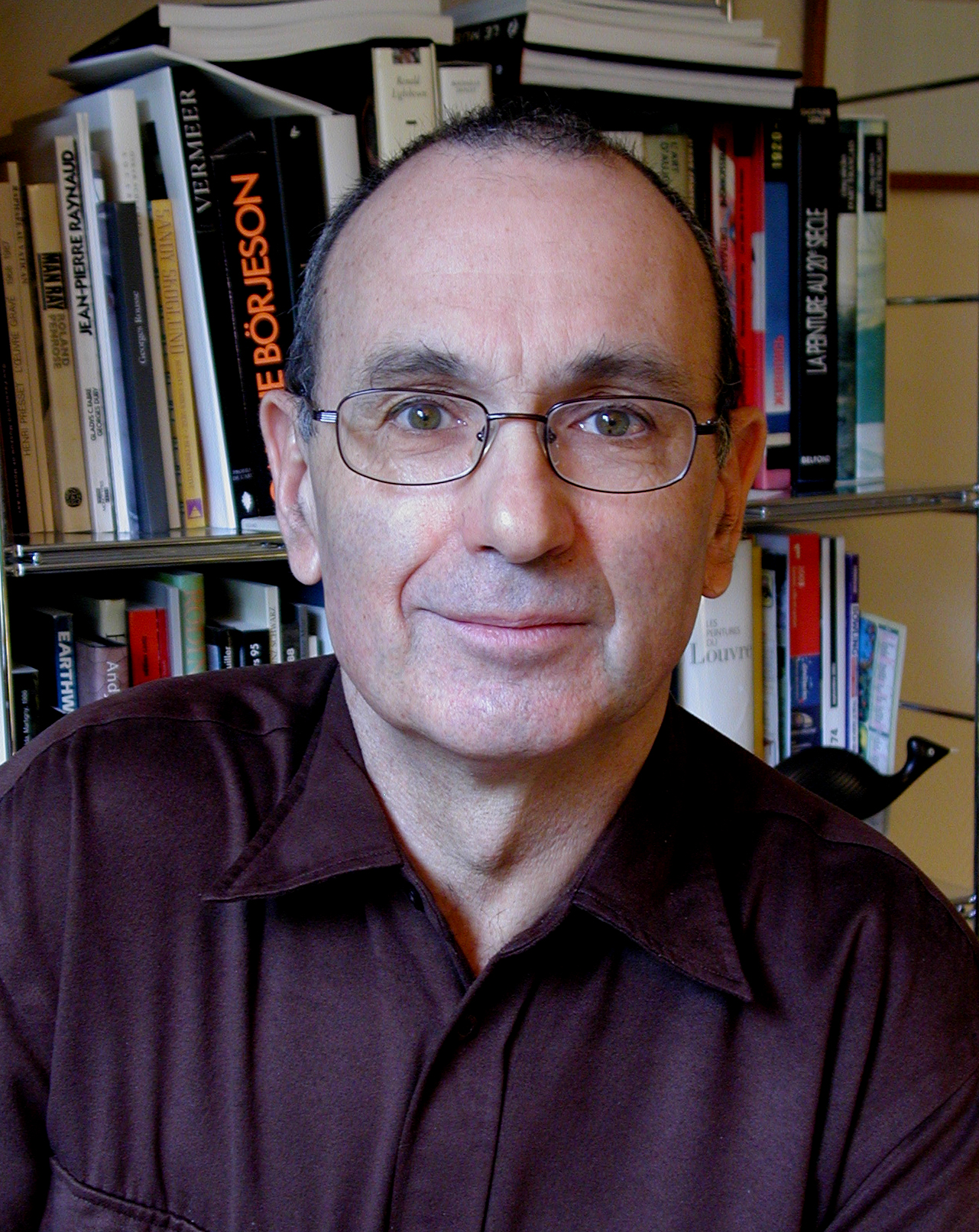
- Born: 1 December 1944 (age 81)
- Occupation: Anti-tobacco activist
- Awards: World No Tobacco Day Award 2013

Pascal Diethelm (born 1 December 1944) is a Swiss econometrician and tobacco control activist who is the president of the anti-smoking organization OxySuisse (formerly named OxyRomandie). He formerly worked at the World Health Organization (WHO) from 1970 until his retirement in 1999.

== Career ==
At the WHO, he developed a database to monitor smoking prevalence rates around the world. When he retired from the WHO, he was its headquarters chief of networking and telecommunications in Geneva, Switzerland. In the 2000s, while working at the University of Geneva, Diethelm discovered that the Swedish scientist Ragnar Rylander had been serving as a secret consultant to the tobacco company Philip Morris since the 1970s. Diethelm, along with his colleague Jean-Charles Rielle, were subsequently sued for libel by Rylander after they accused him of "scientific cheating without precedent". The case was ultimately appealed to the Federal Supreme Court of Switzerland before finally being decided in Diethelm's and Rielle's favor.

== Publications ==
=== Articles ===
- See Pubmed

=== Books ===
- Pascal Diethelm and Martin McKee, Lifting the Smokescreen: Tobacco industry strategy to defeat smoke free policies and legislation, European Respiratory Society and French National Cancer Institute, 2006.

== Bibliography ==
- Malka, Sophie; Gregori, Marco (2005). Infiltration : une taupe à la solde de Philip Morris (in French). Georg éditeur. ISBN 9782825709146.
