= Ragnar Rylander =

Swedish environmental health researcher

- Born: 12 September 1935
- Died: 13 April 2016 (aged 80)

Academic work
- Discipline: environmental health
- Institutions: University of Gothenburg
- Main interests: health effects of tobacco

Ragnar Rylander (12 September 1935 – 13 April 2016) was a Swedish environmental health scholar who served as professor and chair of Environmental Medicine at the University of Gothenburg. He was active in researching the health effects of tobacco while secretly serving as a consultant to Philip Morris for many years.

== Conflict of interest ==
Two tobacco control activists, Pascal Diethelm and Jean-Charles Rielle, co-authored an article asserting that, while he was working at Geneva University, Rylander had engaged in "scientific cheating without precedent" by receiving undisclosed tobacco industry funding for research downplaying the harms of passive smoking. Rylander subsequently sued Diethelm and Rielle for libel, but in 2004, Rylander lost the case on appeal.

Also in 2004, Rylander was appointed to the Scientific Committee on Health and Environmental Risks of the European Commission, an appointment which proved controversial due to his failure to disclose his ties to the tobacco industry. In response to criticism of this appointment, Rylander was removed from the Committee soon afterward. In 2005, he received the "Cockroach of the year" award, a mocking award handed out by the Swedish anti-tobacco organization Non-Smoking Generation.

== Bibliography ==
- Malka, Sophie; Gregori, Marco (2005). Infiltration : une taupe à la solde de Philip Morris (in French). Georg éditeur. ISBN 9782825709146.
