= Cheryl Cohen =

South African public health researcher

- Education: University of the Witwatersrand; London School of Hygiene & Tropical Medicine
- Scientific career
- Workplaces: National Institute for Communicable Diseases; University of the Witwatersrand
- Thesis: ' 'Influenza-associated morbidity and mortality in South Africa' ' (2014)

Cheryl Cohen is a South African public health researcher who is a professor at the University of the Witwatersrand. She looks to develop evidence-based policy to reduce the burdens of respiratory diseases. During the COVID-19 pandemic. Cohen investigated the rates of COVID-19 in South Africa.

== Early life and education ==
Cohen was inspired by her mother to pursue a career in medicine. As a child, she accompanied her mother on ward rounds in her local infectious diseases hospital. She eventually studied medicine at the University of the Witwatersrand. She became aware that it was difficult to treat infectious diseases in Africa. In particular, it was difficult in securing antiretroviral medications for the treatment of HIV. She has described working in hospitals at the time as like being in a war zone. She decided that she would have more of an impact working in public health, so earned a MSc in epidemiology at the London School of Hygiene & Tropical Medicine. Her doctoral research considered morbidity and mortality related to influenza in South Africa.

== Research and career ==
Cohen leads the Center for Respiratory Disease and Meningitis at the National Institute for Communicable Diseases. She oversees public health surveillance for respiratory diseases. In 2009, she established a national surveillance programme for respiratory infections. Her work revealed that the disease burden of influenza in South Africa exceeded that of high income countries. She identified that HIV positive individuals have an elevated risk of severe illnesses associated with influenza. She showed that the majority of adults hospitalised with influenza were also infected with HIV.

Cohen found that young children were particularly susceptible to influenza, and recommended that future vaccination programmes focus on this demographic. When the COVID-19 pandemic spread across the world in 2020, Cohen was well prepared for analysing the epidemiology of SARS-CoV-2. She identified that around 85% of COVID infected people were asymptomatic. She also showed that people living with HIV were more likely to suffer from severe forms of COVID-19, and that they were likely to shed SARS-CoV-2 for longer.

== Selected publications ==
- Anne von Gottberg; Linda de Gouveia; Stefano Tempia; et al. (11 November 2014). "Effects of vaccination on invasive pneumococcal disease in South Africa". The New England Journal of Medicine. 371 (20): 1889–1899. doi:10.1056/nejmoa1401914. ISSN 0028-4793. PMID 25386897. Wikidata Q41667955.
- Sonja J Olsen; Eduardo Azziz-Baumgartner; Alicia P Budd; Lynnette Brammer; Sheena Sullivan; Rodrigo Fasce Pineda; Cheryl Cohen; Alicia M Fry (18 September 2020). "Decreased Influenza Activity During the COVID-19 Pandemic - United States, Australia, Chile, and South Africa, 2020". Morbidity and Mortality Weekly Report. 69 (37): 1305–1309. doi:10.15585/mmwr.mm6937a6. ISSN 0149-2195. PMC 7498167. PMID 32941415. Wikidata Q99561460.
- Cheryl Cohen; Joanne M White; Emma J Savage; Judith R Glynn; Yoon Choi; Nick Andrews; David Brown; Mary Elizabeth Ramsay (1 January 2007). "Vaccine effectiveness estimates, 2004-2005 mumps outbreak, England". Emerging Infectious Diseases. 13 (1): 12–17. doi:10.3201/eid1301.060649. ISSN 1080-6040. PMC 2913658. PMID 17370510. Wikidata Q34034726.
