= Global Health Observatory =

Public health observatory

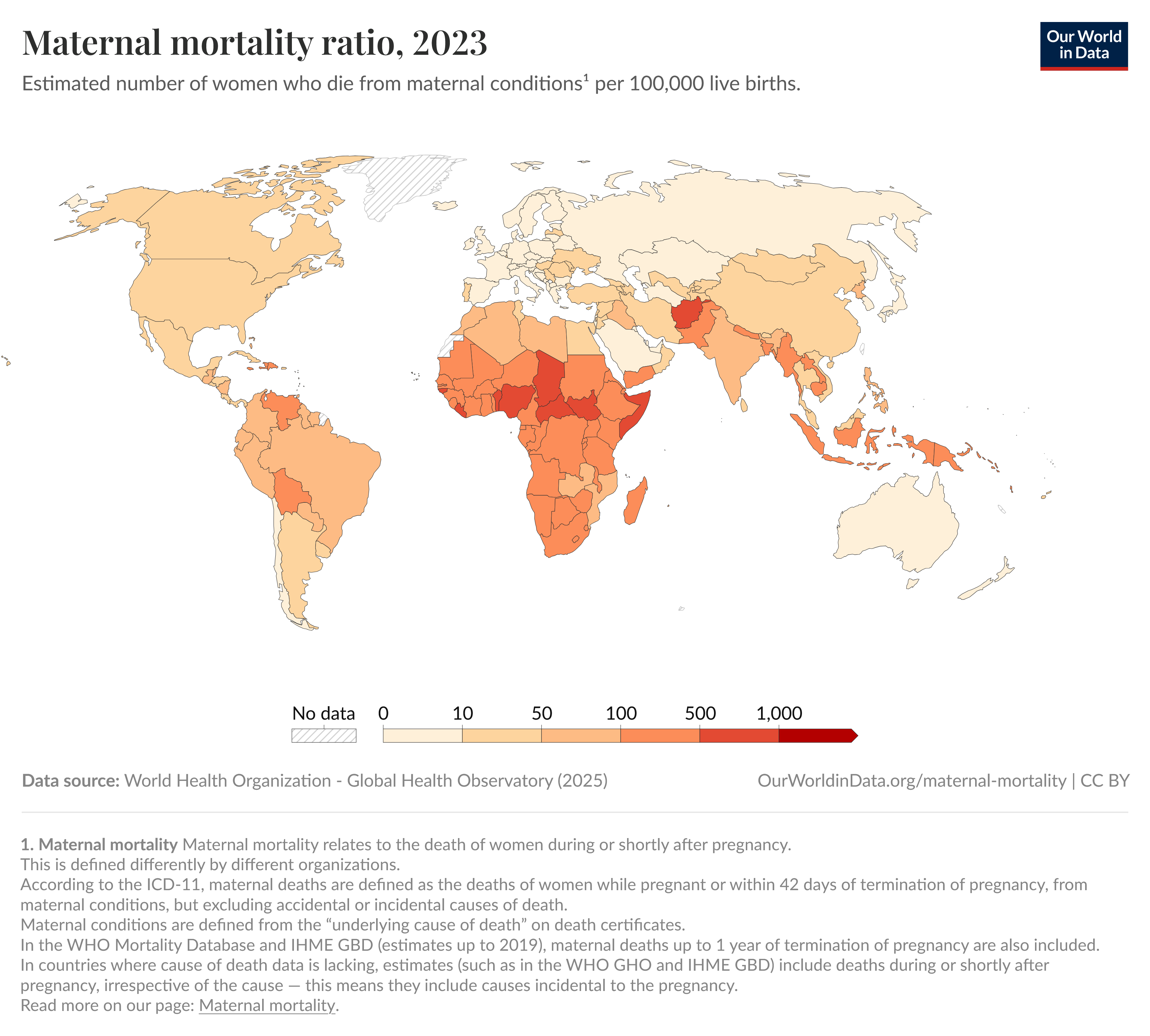
Maternal mortality ratio per 100,000 live births (1985–2023), according to the WHO's Global Health Observatory.

The Global Health Observatory (GHO) is a public health observatory established by the World Health Organization (WHO) to share data on global health, including statistics by country and information about specific diseases and health measures. The GHO tracks important information like "Response to the Millennium Development Goals".

== History ==
The GHO was formed in around 2010 from the ashes of the WHO Statistical Information System, which was "upgraded... to provide you with more data, more tools, more analysis and more reports."

In December 2012, the WHO announced that it was making improvements in its GHO to improve its accessibility and usability by "specialists such as statisticians, epidemiologists, economists and public health researchers as well as anyone with an interest in global health."

== Themes ==
The GHO website is organized around themes. For each theme, key statistics are presented on the associated webpage, and more detailed data and reports are available for download. The themes include:

- Millennium Development Goals
- Estimates of mortality and global health
- Health systems
- Public health and environment
- Health Equity Monitor
- International Health Regulations Monitoring framework
- Urban health
- Women and health
- Noncommunicable diseases
- Substance use and mental health
- Infectious diseases
- Injuries and violence

== Reception and impact ==
The GHO has been listed by many libraries and dataset listings as a go-to source for information on health statistics. The GHO has also been cited in work of the Centers for Disease Control and Prevention in the United States.

GHO data has also been cited in academic studies on various aspects of global health, particularly for cross-country comparisons.

== See also ==
- The World Bank data sets
- Gapminder, which compiles data on a number of indicators, including health indicators, from a variety of sources
- Human Mortality Database, which includes information on mortality and causes of mortality, but is restricted to data built from official records
