= Myers-JDC-Brookdale Institute =

Applied social research institute in Israel

The Myers-JDC-Brookdale Institute (MJB) is a Jerusalem-based applied research and consulting institute on social policy and human services, serving Israel, the Jewish world, and the international community.

The Institute's mission is to identify and study key social issues, and contribute to shaping policy, designing programs and improving services for individuals, families, and communities.

== History and development ==
In 1974, the JDC-Brookdale Institute of Gerontology was established with a grant from the Brookdale Foundation as a partnership between the American Jewish Joint Distribution Committee (AJJDC) and the Government of Israel.

The Institute's original focus was on addressing the challenges of an aging society in Israel. Over time, this mandate expanded to include a broad range of social challenges facing Israel, including children and youth at risk, integration of immigrants and other minorities, integrating people with disabilities, employment of disadvantaged populations, and improving the quality of the social service sector.

In 2004, the Cleveland-based David and Inez Myers Foundation joined the partnership with a $15 million endowment gift. In recognition, the Institute was renamed the Myers-JDC-Brookdale Institute.

== Organization ==
Today, MJB includes 3 research groups, including 10 research teams: The Family Group (Children and Youth team, Aging team, Disabilities team, Social Inclusion team); Systems group (Health Policy team, Employment team, Arab Population team); Quality in Social Services Group (Outcomes team, Quality Assurance team); and Pathfinder Research Innovation and Development team.

In 2017, Prof. Michael Hartal was named Executive Director, replacing Prof. Jack Habib, who had been with MJB since its founding.

The Institute's multi-disciplinary approach is reflected in the diversity of the 130+ research and support staff, who have backgrounds in anthropology, economics, education, gerontology, health, psychology, public policy, social work, sociology, statistics, and more.

MJB's Governance Committee includes representatives from the Israeli Government (ministries of Finance; Education; Health; Labor, Social Affairs, and Social Services; Ministry of Social Equality; and the National Insurance Institute (Israel's Social Security Administration), the American Jewish Joint Distribution Committee, and the David and Inez Myers Foundation.

== History ==
As a partnership between the government and the philanthropic sector, MJB seeks to "promote the application and impact of the research while ensuring academic independence and objectivity."

At the core of the Institute's work are evaluations of national social initiatives, both in their development phase and the national dissemination phase.

In the 1990s, the mass immigration of Ethiopian Jews in Israel created a need for an entirely new social policy and service infrastructure to promote their integration into Israeli society. The Institute evaluated a number of the national initiatives, such as the Ethiopian National Project and PACT (Parents and Children Together), which were established as partnerships between the government and Jewish philanthropic sources.

Also in the 1990s, the Institute began conducting the National Consumer Health Survey, a bi-annual national satisfaction survey of Israel's national health insurance system. The findings are consistently cited by the four national health care plans in their competition for new members.

The National Program for Children and Youth at Risk was developed with the professional input of MJB researchers in the mid-2000s, and the Institute has remained involved in the program's expansion. A number of national initiatives to address the challenges of aging society have been developed and evaluated by the Institute, including Israel's first National Strategy for Dementia and other Alzheimer's in 2013, and programs to promote employment among seniors. A 2019 study on patient-centered care measured the implementation of this approach in fertility clinics, and helped to raise national awareness of the active role that patients can take in their own medical care.

The Institute also promotes international exchange among researchers and policy makers. It is a co-sponsor of the Israel Journal of Health Policy Research. MJB is also responsible for the Israel country report to the European Observatory on Health Systems and Policies.

During the COVID-19 pandemic, the Institute conducted a national survey of health behaviors among the Israeli public. The survey found that 43% of adults ate more than they did prior to the pandemic, 56% of their children increased their intake, and both groups saw a rise in junk food consumption. In addition, one-third of adults reported worsened quality of sleep.
