= Donald Reid Medal =

The Donald Reid Medal is awarded triennially by the London School of Hygiene and Tropical Medicine in recognition of distinguished contributions to epidemiology.

== Institution ==
The medal was instituted in 1979 in memory of Professor Donald Reid (1914–1977), who was director of the Department of Medical Statistics and Epidemiology at the London School of Hygiene and Tropical Medicine from 1961 until his sudden death in 1977. The medal was created by the distinguished medal sculptor Louis Osman. The School Council of the London School of Hygiene and Tropical Medicine and the Royal College of Physicians of London propose names for the medal and the eventual recipient of the medal is then nominated by a Committee composed of the Dean of the London School of Hygiene and Tropical Medicine, two members nominated by the School Council, two members nominated by the president of the Royal College of Physicians (not being members of the staff of the London School of Hygiene and Tropical Medicine) and one member nominated by the Faculty of Public Health Medicine.

== The missing award ==
Although the award is officially given every three years, there has been a period in which this regularity was not observed. After Jeremiah Stamler received the medal in 1988, it was not then awarded for five years until 1993 (to Richard Peto), and then not for a further four years until 1997 (Brian MacMahon). Thus, in this 9-year period when three awards should have been made, only two were. In 1991, when the award was not made at all, the London School of Hygiene and Tropical Medicine was undergoing a period of restructuring following the appointment of Professor Richard Feachem as the Dean (the former Dean, Professor Gordon Smith having retired in 1989). The award made in 1993 was either two years late, or one year early because no 1994 award was made either. However, the 1997 award was made in accordance with the three-year cycle and re-established the regularity of the award.

== Recipients ==
- 1979 – Abraham Manie Adelstein
- 1982 – Michael Shepherd
- 1985 – Geoffrey Rose
- 1988 – Jeremiah Stamler
- 1991 – no award
- 1993 – Richard Peto
- 1997 – Brian MacMahon
- 2000 – Nicholas Day
- 2003 – Peter Smith
- 2006 – Val Beral
- 2009 – Paul Fine
- 2012 – ?
- 2015 – Salim Abdulla (Ifakara Health Institute, Tanzania)

== See also ==
- List of medicine awards
- List of prizes named after people
