= Bernard Beckerman =

20th-century theatre director and Shakespeare scholar

Bernard Beckerman (1921–1985) was a Shakespeare scholar, a theatre director. He was also the head of Hofstra University's department of drama, and later the Chair of Brander Matthews Professor of Dramatic Literature at the Columbia University's theater department.

Beckerman's books include Dynamics of Drama, Shakespeare at the Globe, and Theatrical Presentation: Performer, Audience and Act.

From 1950 to 1961, Beckerman directed all the plays at Hofstra's annual Shakespeare festival. Beckerman was also responsible for introducing the Poo-wa-bah tradition at Hofstra, which continues to this day. His wife was Gloria Brim (b.), Professor of literature at the Adelphi University, who married the cardiologist Jeremiah Stamler in 2004.

In 1982 he established the annual seminar on Shakespeare (582) at the Columbia University, during which, after his death, a Bernard and Gloria Beckerman Memorial Lecture is presented in honor of the founder.

== Sources ==
- "Bernard Beckerman on Dramatic Literature"; in: Burnet M. Hobgood (ed.), Master Teachers of Theatre: Observations on Teaching Theatre by Nine American Masters, Southern Illinois University Press ISBN 978-0-8093-1464-5 (pp. 23–24)
