= Judith Glynn =

Scientist

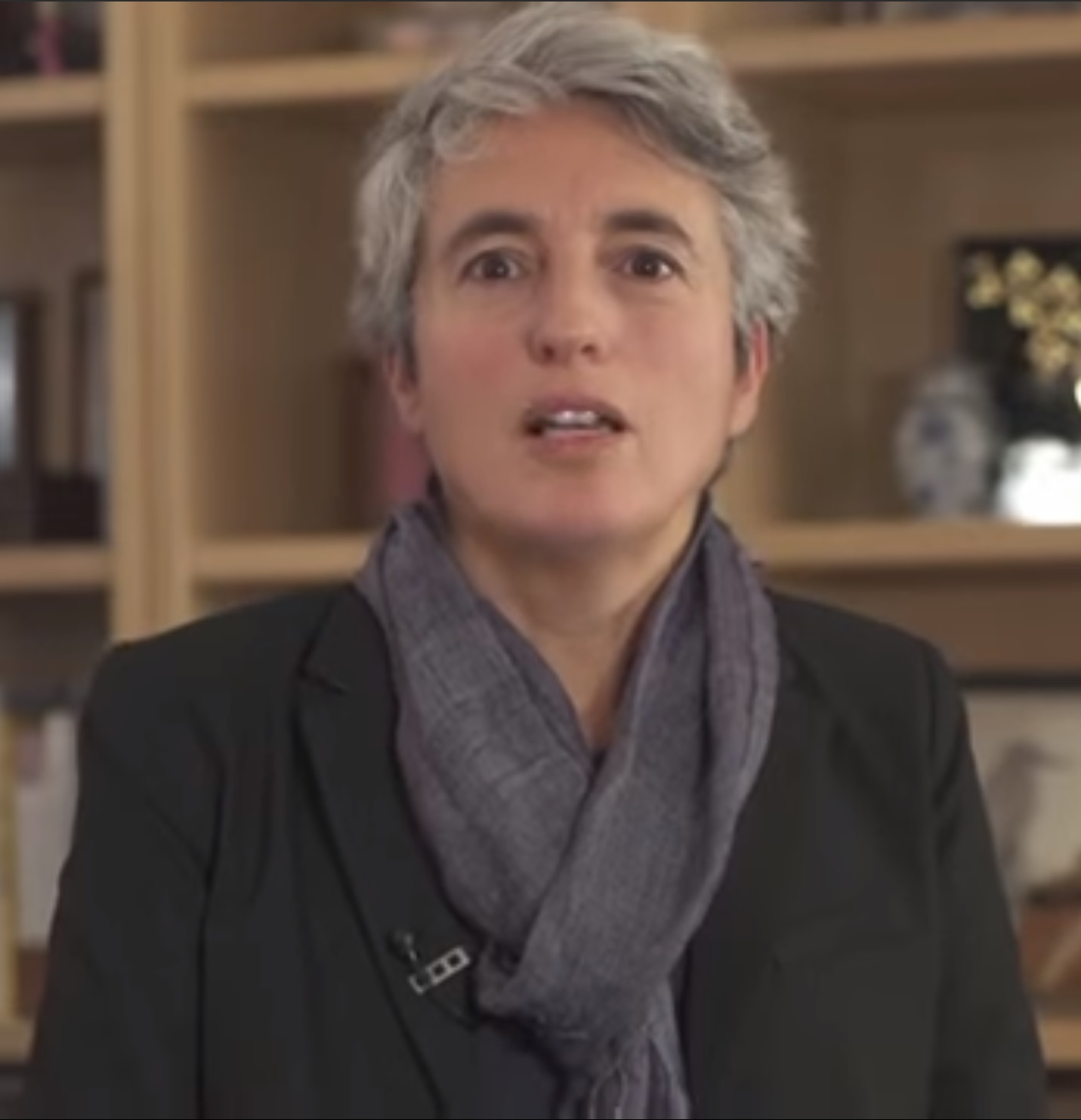
- Judith Glynn presenting "Ebola in Context" for the London School of Hygiene and Tropical Medicine in 2015
- Education: London School of Hygiene & Tropical Medicine
- Scientific career
- Workplaces: London School of Hygiene & Tropical Medicine

Judith Glynn is a Professor of Epidemiology at the London School of Hygiene & Tropical Medicine. She worked on the Karonga Prevention Study on HIV and Tuberculosis in Malawi. She is also a sculptor.

== Education and early career ==
Glynn completed an MSc in Epidemiology at London School of Hygiene & Tropical Medicine in 1990. She completed her PhD in infectious diseases in 1993.

== Career ==
Glynn has worked in Malawi, Sierra Leone and South Africa. She studies the relationship between education and health. She has conducted several large-scale studies into the prevalence of infectious diseases in Africa. Glynn studies the relationship between mycobacterium tuberculosis and HIV. In 1998, Glynn studied the resurgence of tuberculous and how it was impacted by HIV infection. She monitored the Beijing genotype of mycobacterium tuberculosis for seven years in Malawi. She hypothesised that it may have originated from Chinese agricultural advisors. She continued to monitor tuberculosis in Malawi for several decades. She began to monitor the association of HIV and educational attainment in Thailand and Africa. She found that in Thailand, more schooling resulted in less infection, whereas in Africa higher attainment resulted in a greater risk. She discussed her work on sequencing the mycobacterium tuberculosis genome on the eLife podcast.

She was awarded a Department of Health Public Health Career Scientist Award in 2002. In 2008 Glynn edited the book HIV, Resurgent Infections and Population Change in Africa. She identified that access to free HIV/AIDS drugs resulted in a significant reduction of adult mortality rates. Glynn went on to study how the menarche impacted the prevalence of herpes simplex. In 2015 she ran a free three-week course in the science of ebola. The course was made available on FutureLearn. She monitored recrudescence of severe Ebola in Western Africa. Since 2016, Glynn has been a member of the Public Health England Rapid Support Team.

Using the anti-glycoprotein IgG capture assay, Glynn demonstrated that asymptomatic Ebola virus infection occurs but would have little impact on herd immunity. She used data from 2007 to 2016 to show that failure in the early stages of school in Malawi could be used to predict pregnancy and marriage.

=== Sculpture ===
Glynn is sculptor. She uses her sculpture to illustrate human life and interactions. For the Bloomsbury Festival, Glynn created a mobile sculpture that visualised Indo-European languages. She has exhibited in Hampton Court Palace and Clare Hall, Cambridge. In Aspects of Life, Glynn used wire, bronze and giant sea pods to depict chromosomes.
