= Valerie Beral =

Australian-British epidemiologist (1946–2022)

Dame Valerie Beral AC DBE FRS FRCOG FMedSci MRCP
- Born: 28 July 1946; Sydney, Australia
- Died: 26 August 2022 (aged 76); Oxford, England
- Education: University of Sydney; London School of Hygiene and Tropical Medicine
- Known for: Breast cancer epidemiology
- Spouse: Professor Paul Fine
- Awards: Fellow of the Royal Society (2006); Dame Commander of the Order of the British Empire (2010); Companion of the Order of Australia (2010)
- Scientific career
- Fields: Epidemiology; Cancer Epidemiology; Breast cancer Women's health
- Workplaces: University of Oxford; London School of Hygiene and Tropical Medicine; Hammersmith Hospital
- Valerie Beral's voice from the BBC programme The Life Scientific (BBC Radio 4), 2 Feb 2013
- Website: www.ndph.ox.ac.uk/team/valerie-beral

Dame Valerie Beral (28 July 1946 – 26 August 2022) was an Australian-born British epidemiologist, academic and a specialist in breast cancer epidemiology. She was Professor of Epidemiology, a Fellow of Green Templeton College, Oxford and was the Head of the Cancer Epidemiology Unit at the University of Oxford and Cancer Research UK from 1989.

== Early life and education ==
Valerie Beral was born in Australia on 28 July 1946, the younger daughter of Ilse (nee Rubel) and Herbert Beral, who had relocated to Australia from Bucovina (an area now split between Romania and Ukraine) in 1939. She completed her MBBS degree graduating with first-class honours from the University of Sydney in 1969. Beral then spent six months travelling the "hippie trail" through Asia of which she said "That taught me how much I wanted to work. But I still wanted to leave Australia."

== Career ==
At Hammersmith Hospital, she worked under Charles Fletcher, who recognised that she was suited to epidemiology and so propelled her towards the London School of Hygiene and Tropical Medicine. There she completed a combined course in Epidemiology & Statistics in 1971–72 under the tutorship of Donald Reid. Beral felt very comfortable with the move because she had never felt happy in clinical medicine. She says that "she had never been able to understand how her peers could be so certain about making decisions on incomplete evidence. Epidemiology has offered her not an escape from that uncertainty, but the opportunity to tackle it head on." She was a member of the Royal College of Physicians.

One of Beral's first epidemiological interests was the combined oral contraceptive pill because of work she had previously done in family planning. Beral moved on to other projects but this is an area in which the data have yet to provide support for her initial instinct that the contraceptive pill, like pregnancy, will eventually be shown to protect against breast cancer. Later work included the effects of radiation, breast cancer trials and screening, AIDS, gene therapy, Hiroshima survivors, Chernobyl, food toxins, and much else. The British Medical Journal described her tally of jobs, publications, and committees as reading "like a checklist of the epidemiological causes célebres of the past three decades".

Beral completed her training in 1972 and began working for the London School of Hygiene and Tropical Medicine for a number of years. From there she moved to direct the Cancer Research UK Cancer Epidemiology Unit at the University of Oxford in 1989. Beral said of being offered the role: "One of the major deterrents when I was offered the ICRF job in 1989 was the thought of being so much in the public eye. It's not my nature."

Beral served on various international committees for the World Health Organization and the United States National Academy of Sciences. She also chaired the Department of Health's Advisory Committee on Breast Cancer Screening.

=== Million Women Study ===
Beral was one of the leaders of the Million Women Study which was opened in 1997, and has recruited more than 1.3 million UK women over 50 via the NHS breast screening centres. The study is investigating how a woman's reproductive history can affect her health, with a particular focus on the effects of hormone replacement therapy (HRT). It is the largest such study in the world with one in four of UK women in the target age group participating.

In August 2003, Beral's group published results showing that taking HRT increases a woman's risk of developing breast cancer with an estimated 20,000 UK women aged 50–64 having possibly developed the disease between 1993 and 2003 due to HRT use. The study also showed that risk increases the longer a woman uses HRT, but drops to the normal level within five years after stopping use.

== Personal life and death ==
Beral lived in Oxford with her American husband, Paul Fine, who worked at the London School of Hygiene and Tropical Medicine.

Beral maintained close links with Australia but "could not imagine returning to live there". Aside from concerns that Australia would hold little for her partner, she joked that "The population's too small!" to satisfy her needs as an epidemiologist.

Beral died in Oxford on 26 August 2022, at the age of 76, after a year-long illness with cancer. She was survived by her husband, their two sons, two grandchildren, and her sister.

== Honours and awards ==
- Donald Reid Medal – in 2006 Beral was recognised by the London School of Hygiene and Tropical Medicine for her ground-breaking work in cancer epidemiology and women's health, most notably through the Million Women study, as well as her earlier contributions to the School.
- Honorary Fellow of the Royal College of Obstetricians and Gynaecologists (FRCOG) since 2000.
- Honorary Doctor of Medicine degree of the University of Aberdeen in 2005.
- Honorary Fellow at the Faculty of Public Health Medicine of the University of Aberdeen since 2000.
- Fellow of the Royal Society (FRS) for scientific contributions to epidemiology.
- Fellow of the Academy of Medical Sciences (FMedSci) since 1999.
- Dame Commander of the Order of the British Empire (DBE) in the 2010 New Year Honours.
- Companion of the Order of Australia (AC) in the 2010 Queen's Birthday Honours List "for eminent service to medicine and women's health through significant advances in cancer research and epidemiology, through seminal contributions to public health policy and as a mentor to young scientists."
- A portrait of Beral by photographer Anne-Katrin Purkiss was acquired by the National Portrait Gallery, London for its permanent collection in 2011.
