= European Journal of Public Health =

- Discipline: Public health
- Language: English
- Edited by: Peter Allebeck

Publication details
- History: 1991-present
- Publisher: Oxford University Press on behalf of the European Public Health Association
- Frequency: Bimonthly
- Impact factor: 4.424 (2021)

Standard abbreviations
- ISO 4: Eur. J. Public Health

Indexing
- CODEN: EJPHF6
- ISSN: 1101-1262 (print); 1464-360X (web)
- LCCN: sn92033159
- OCLC no.: 45043567

Links
- Journal homepage; Online access; Online archive

The European Journal of Public Health is a bimonthly peer-reviewed public health journal. It was established in 1991 and is published by Oxford University Press on behalf of the European Public Health Association. The editor-in-chief is Peter Allebeck (Stockholm County Council and Karolinska Institutet). According to the Journal Citation Reports, the journal has a 2020 impact factor of 3.367.
