= Helen Gregory (medical missionary) =

Scottish medical missionary

Helen (Ella) Gregory (11 April 1898 – 17 April 1946) was a Scottish medical missionary who worked in India for more than 17 years. She was portrayed as a first-rate solicitous medic.

== Early life ==
Helen Gregory was born on 11 April 1898 in Edinburgh, Scotland, and a daughter of Thomas Gregory, a dental surgeon, and Helen Williamson. She attended Brunstane School for Girls and later the University of Edinburgh Medical School, where she qualified in 1921 with a MBChB. She also obtained a diploma from the London School of Tropical Medicine in 1922.

== Family ==
In the extensive Gregory family the medical profession was a tradition, counting around 36 doctors and dentists, all descendants of their grandfather John Gregory, silversmith, and their grandmother, Hannah Steer. Her elder sister, Andrina Gregory (1896–1966) was a qualified nurse from the Edinburgh College of Domestic Science and cared privately for Sir Arthur Conan Doyle. Her younger sister, Margaret (Margot) Gregory (1904–1952) was a graduate of Edinburgh College of Art (ECA) who shared a flat with artists Edward Gage, Valerie Gage and Archie Watt. She was promoted Captain of the 19th Company Edinburgh Division, Girl Guides, then District Commissioner, Crewe Toll, cooperated with the Guide International Service Team as a driver of large army trucks in the effort of post-war reconstruction of Germany.

== Career ==
Participating with the Baptist Missionary Society, she was based at its hospital in Berhampore for longer than 17 years, lately as assistant-superintendent. She was presented with the Kaisar-i-Hind Medal.

== Death and legacy ==
After visiting Edinburgh in 1941, her illness prevented her from returning to India. In her death notice she was remembered as a medic of excellent finesse and notable deeds, with 'a radiant charm of personality that drew the hearts of Indian and European alike with a magnetic power’. Berhampore hospital dedicated to her a memorial Prayer Hall.
