= Peter Smith (epidemiologist) =

Epidemiologist in the United Kingdom

Professor Peter Smith CBE FMedSci

Professor of Tropical Epidemiology, London School of Hygiene and Tropical Medicine
- Incumbent
- Assumed office 1989

Personal details
- Born: Peter George Smith; 3 May 1942 (age 83)
- Occupation: Epidemiologist

Peter George Smith (born 3 May 1942) is a British epidemiologist who is Professor of Tropical Epidemiology at the London School of Hygiene and Tropical Medicine (LSHTM).

== Background ==
Peter Smith graduated in mathematics from City University, London and joined the Medical Research Council's Statistical Research Unit in 1965. He went on to work on various aspects of epidemiological and statistical research including: MRC Clinical and Population Cytogenetics Research Unit, Edinburgh (1967–69); Makerere University Medical School, Uganda (1970–71); International Agency for Research on Cancer, Lyon, France and Uganda (1971–72); Imperial Cancer Research Fund Cancer Epidemiology Unit, Oxford (1972–79). He joined LSHTM in 1979 to head the Tropical Epidemiology Unit. In 1987 he was placed at the Harvard School of Public Health, Boston and was also involved in the Tropical Diseases Research Programme of WHO in that year. He headed the Department of Epidemiology and Population Sciences at the LSHTM from 1990-96. In 1997 the Department of Infectious and Tropical Diseases was formed at the LSHTM, which he headed until 2002. He is currently Professor of Tropical Epidemiology.

== Other Appointments ==
- Governor of the Wellcome Trust
- Member of the Partnership Board of the European and Developing Countries Clinical Trials Partnership.
- Deputy Chair of the Nuffield Council on Bioethics.
- He serves on a number of advisory committees of the World Health Organisation and of the UK Government.
- He serves as Chair of the Programme Board for Global Health and Vaccination Research (GLOBVAC), Research Council of Norway for the period 2011–17.

== Research ==
Research interests include large-scale intervention studies against tropical diseases, including vaccine trials. Peter has also been involved in recent years in research on the link between bovine spongiform encephalopathy (BSE) and Creutzfeldt–Jakob disease in humans. From 1996 to 2004 he served on the Spongiform Encephalopathy Advisory Committee, which advises the UK government on BSE and related issues. He was the acting chair of the committee from 1999–2001 and was the chair from August 2001 to July 2004. He also serves on a number of international committees relating to intervention studies against some of the major tropical diseases.

== Honours and awards ==
Peter Smith received professional recognition with the presentation of:

- Donald Reid Medal for Epidemiology in 2003.

He was honoured with:

- CBE
