= Jocelyn DeJong =

American epidemiologist

Jocelyn DeJong is a professor and associate dean at the Department of Epidemiology and Population Health at the Faculty of Health Sciences, American University of Beirut. Her research focuses on sexual and reproductive health, including AIDS, and its relation to population and development. She was a central actor for setting up the first task force on female genital mutilation in Egypt.

== Life ==
DeJong is an expert on health and gender issues. She received her Bachelor of Arts in social anthropology from Harvard University, her Master of Philosophy from the University of Sussex in 1987, and her PhD from the London School of Hygiene & Tropical Medicine in 1994. Among other things, she has worked on AIDS and reproductive health for the Ford Foundation in the Middle East and North Africa. In the lead-up to the International Conference on Population and Development in Cairo in 1994, she assisted advocacy groups with research, supported by the Ford Foundation. In this role, she became a central actor in setting up the first task force on female genital mutilation in Egypt. She was also a program officer in reproductive health for the Ford Foundation at their regional office in Cairo, Egypt, supporting programs on reproductive health and HIV/AIDS by NGOs, governments and universities across the MENA region.

Since September 15, 2005, she has been working at the American University of Beirut in Lebanon. Her research at the American University of Beirut has, among other things, focused on sexual and reproductive health in populations affected by conflict, especially Syrians. Recent studies have focused on topics such as early marriage among Syrian refugees in Lebanon. She was the coordinator of the Reproductive Health Working Group, a network for capacity building in the Arab countries and Turkey between 2007 and 2019. At the American University of Beirut, she was the chair of the Interprofessional Education Committee.

During the COVID-19 pandemic, she joined forces with several other researchers, in an "urgent call for reliable, disaggregated and openly shared data" in the MENA region.
