= Geoffrey Rose (epidemiologist) =

Geoffrey Arthur Rose CBE (19 April 1926 – 12 November 1993) was an eminent epidemiologist whose ideas have been credited with transforming the approach to strategies for improving health. He was formerly the Emeritus Professor of Epidemiology at the Department of Epidemiology, London School of Hygiene and Tropical Medicine.

== Early life and career ==
Geoffrey Rose was born in London on 19 April 1926 to Arthur Norman Rose, a Methodist minister, and Mary née Wadsworth, who was the daughter of a Methodist minister. After training as a medical doctor in Kingsmead and Oxford University, he joined the epidemiology department of the London School of Hygiene and Tropical Medicine (LSHTM) in 1958 and became a part-time Reader in 1964. In 1970 he became the visiting professor of Epidemiology and Preventive Medicine and was elected to Full Professor of Epidemiology in 1977. In his time at the LSHTM he worked with many pioneering epidemiologists, including Donald Reid. He was also responsible for starting the Masters in Epidemiology course. He died 12 November 1993.

== Influence ==
Of his numerous publications, there are two that stand out in terms of their influence on the discipline of epidemiology, the seminal 1985 article "Sick Individuals and Sick Populations" and his 1992 book "The Strategy of Preventive Medicine". The impact goes beyond the field of epidemiology and into that of public health generally. One publication claimed that "A casual Social Sciences Citation Index search yielded over 700 citations of this work". As S Schwartz and AV Diez-Roux pointed out, the central lesson that has been integrated into the aforementioned fields is that "a large number of people at a small risk may give rise to more cases of disease than the small number who are at high risk". It was their assertion that this insight of Rose has profound implications for intervention and prevention strategies, and has been incorporated into research contexts through an understanding of the difference between measures of absolute and relative risk.

Rose is among the physicians and epidemiologists who best conveyed the notion that "as citizens and societies we have shared, common responsibilities in front of threats to health is central to epidemiology, public health, even to clinical medicine". He also clearly showed that a preventive measure that brings large benefits to the community may offer little to each participating person. For example, to prevent one death due to a motor vehicle accident, many hundreds of people must wear seat belts. Conversely, an intervention which brings much benefit to an individual may have a small impact in the population. These phenomena are sometimes called prevention paradoxes.

== ‘High-risk strategy' ==
According to Rose, the ‘high-risk strategy' to prevention is a clinically oriented approach to preventive medicine which focuses its efforts on needy individuals with the highest levels of the risk factor ('the deviant minority with high-risk status'), and uses the established framework of medical services. In other words, the 'high-risk strategy' is 'a targeted rescue operation for vulnerable individuals'. The aim is to help each person reduce the high level of exposure to a cause or to some intermediate variable. Main strengths of this strategy include: the intervention may be matched to the needs of the individual; it may avoid interference with those who are not at a special risk; it may be accommodated within the ethical and cultural values, organisation, and economics, of the health care system; selectivity may increase the likelihood of a cost-effective use of resources. Main weaknesses of the high-risk strategy are: prevention may become medicalised; success may be palliative and temporary; the contribution to overall (population) control of a disease may be small; the preventive intervention may be behaviourally or culturally inadequate or unsustainable; it has a poor ability to predict which individuals will benefit from the intervention.

A failure of high-risk prevention strategies is their inability to prevent disease in the large part of the population at a relatively small risk and from which most cases of diseases originate. Partly in response to this failure, there is a development of individual predictive medicine and a widening of high-risk categories for numerous conditions, that leads to the application of "pseudo-high-risk" prevention strategies. Nevertheless, widening the criteria for individual preventive interventions lead to treating, individually, larger strata of the population. Such pseudo-high-risk prevention strategies raise similar problems compared with high-risk strategies, however on a larger scale and without any of the benefit of population-based strategies.

== ‘Population strategy’ ==
This is a public health-oriented approach to preventive medicine and public health which predicts that shifting the population distribution of a risk factor prevents more burden of disease than targeting people at high risk. Rose introduced this principle to accommodate members of the community who were at low risk. It starts with the recognition that the occurrence of common exposures and diseases reflects the functioning of society as a whole. The approach is more relevant to decrease exposure to (a) certain environmental agents that individuals have little capacity to detect than to (b) risk factors that individuals may generally decide to avoid. Main strengths of this strategy include: it may be radical (“only the social and political approach confronts the root causes”); the societal effects of a distributional shift may be large; it may be more culturally appropriate and sustainable to seek a general change in behavioural norms and in the social values that facilitate their adoption than to attempt to individually change behaviours that are socially conditioned. Main limitations of the population strategy are: it offers only a small benefit to each participating individual, which may be wiped out by a small risk; it requires major changes in the economics and mode of functioning of society, which often makes changes unlikely. Individuals generally prefer to pay as late as possible, and to enjoy the benefits as soon as possible. Social benefits –which are often achieved through processes with the opposite timing of costs and benefits– may thus be scarcely attractive to the individual. Nevertheless, shared values and targets do exist at the community level.

It was reasserted by Doyle, Furey and Flowers, writing in 2005, that the central messages expounded by Rose remain highly relevant to modern public health policy and practice.

== Honours and awards ==
- Donald Reid Medal for Epidemiology in 1985.
- CBE 1991
