= Marie-Claire Faray =

Women's activist

Marie-Claire Faray is a women's activist from the Democratic Republic of the Congo.

== Early life and education ==
Faray obtained a Bachelor of Science at the London Metropolitan University and graduated from the London School of Hygiene and Tropical Medicine with a Master of Science. Upon graduation, she went to Queen Mary University of London to work while completing her PhD.

== Career ==
Faray works as a Postgraduate Medical Information Adviser and Research Scientist in infectious diseases at the Queen Mary University of London and Barts Hospital. Faray lobbies for the creation of international guidelines that respect the law and government by campaigning against violence towards women in Africa, and for general peace and human rights causes.

Faray is involved in promoting the Maputo Protocol for African women's rights. One of her main objectives is to ensure basic human rights for all women and their safety in coordination with Articles 3, 17, 18, 19 and 20 of the Universal Declaration of Human Rights across Africa by 2020 as part of the African Women's Decade movement. She is the Vice President of the UK chapter of the Women's International League for Peace and Freedom, and is on the executive committee for Common Cause UK, a platform which promotes Congolese women in the UK. She is also a member of the Million Women Rise coalition. She is also a member of UK chapter of Million Women Rise, a national coalition of women. on December 16, 2007, in Faray managed with the help two others establish a branch of WILPF in Congolese capital city of Kinshasa.

== United Nations ==
Faray attended the United Nations' 2008 Biennial Meeting of States to discuss the relationship between small arms and violence against women in Africa.

== Personal life ==
Faray lives in London with her two daughters.
