= Andrew Haines =

British epidemiologist (born 1947)

Sir Andrew Haines FRCGP FRCP FFPH
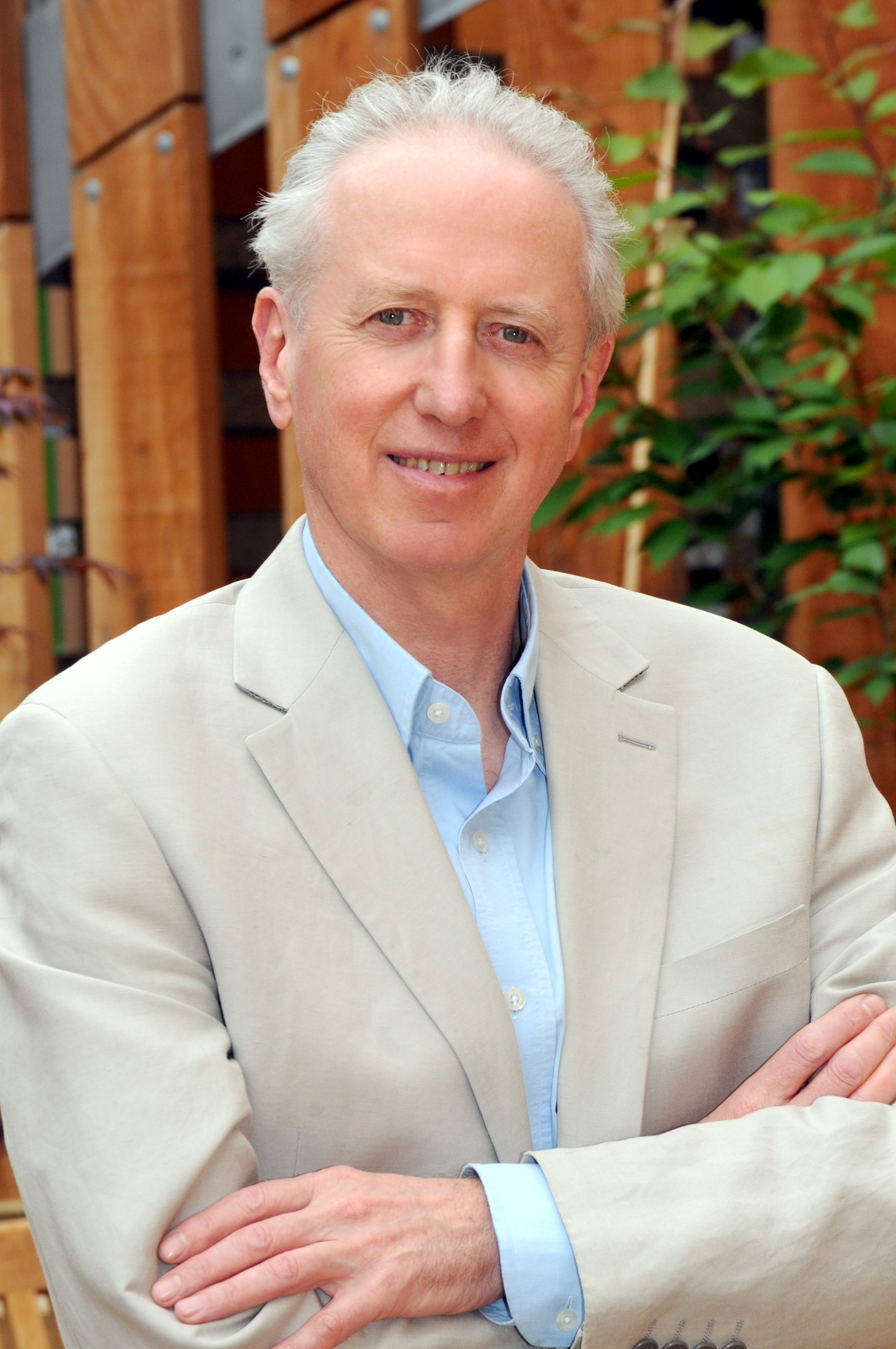
- Andrew Haines
- Born: 26 February 1947 (age 79)
- Education: King's College London
- Scientific career
- Fields: Epidemiology
- Workplaces: London School of Hygiene & Tropical Medicine

Sir Andrew Paul Haines (born 26 February 1947) is a British epidemiologist and academic. He was the director of the London School of Hygiene & Tropical Medicine from 2001 to 2010.

== Early life and education ==
Haines was educated at Latymer Upper School on a state funded scholarship, and at King's College London (MBBS) where he qualified in Medicine in 1969 with honours in pathology, surgery and pharmacology and therapeutics. He gained an MD in Epidemiology in the University of London in 1985.

== Career ==
After a number of hospital appointments he trained in general (family) practice with Dr Julian Tudor Hart in Glyncorrwg, Wales. He was a consultant in epidemiology in the Medical Research Council Epidemiology and Medical Care Unit between 1980 and 1987, and Professor of Primary Health Care at University College London from 1987 to 2000.

He worked part-time as an inner-London General Practitioner between 1980 and 2000. Between 1993 and 1996, he was on part-time secondment as Director of Research and Development at the NHS Executive North Thames (formerly North Thames Regional Health Authority) where he had responsibility for a number of regional and national research programmes. At various times in his career he worked in Jamaica, Nepal, USA, Canada and on sabbatical at the World Health Organization (WHO) in Geneva. He had collaborative links with the Family Health Programme in Brazil for many years.

Formerly a professor of primary health care at University College London, Haines was named Director of the London School of Hygiene & Tropical Medicine in 2001, with responsibility for academic leadership and management of the institution. He served for nearly 10 years.

Under his leadership, the London School of Hygiene & Tropical Medicine received the 2009 Award for Global Health from the Bill & Melinda Gates Foundation worth $1m, for sustained commitment to improving the health of poor people, having been selected from 106 nominations worldwide by an international jury of experts.

Haines was also responsible for setting up the London International Development Centre and for raising £3.7m from Higher Education Funding Council for England for this purpose. The Centre, a collaborative initiative initially between 5 colleges of the University of London now has about 3,000 staff, student and alumni members from 7 constituent colleges.

He has been a member of a number of major international and national committees including the MRC Global Health Group (chair), the MRC Strategy Group and of the WHO Advisory Committee on Health Research. He was chair of a WHO Task Force on Health Systems Research in 2004 and a member of the Council of International Physicians for the Prevention of Nuclear War at the time of the award of the Nobel Peace Prize in 1985. He was also a member of the UN Intergovernmental Panel on Climate Change for the second and third assessment reports and review editor for the health chapter in fifth assessment report. He chaired the Tropical Health Education Trust, and the Research Strategy Committees of the Multiple Sclerosis Society and Marie Curie (supporting research on palliative end-of-life care).

He is currently professor of environmental change and public health at the Centre on Climate Change and Planetary Health at the London School of Hygiene & Tropical Medicine and co-director (with Pauline Scheelbeek) of the WHO Collaborating Centre on Climate Change Health and Sustainable Development.

== Research ==
His research interests were initially in epidemiology and health services research focussing particularly on primary care and latterly on the study of environmental influences on health, including the potential effects of climate change and the health co-benefits of the low carbon economy.

Previous research included a number of randomised trials evaluating interventions to change patient and practitioner behaviour, notably a large trial of general practitioner intervention in patients with heavy alcohol consumption. His first articles on climate change and health were in the early 1990s. He also chaired an international task force on climate change mitigation and public health which published a series of articles in the Lancet in 2009.

As chair of an international task force on guidance for health systems policies he co-authored a series of articles on the challenges of assessing evidence for health systems policies and developing guidance for policymakers, published in 2012. His book co-authored with Howard Frumkin Planetary Health - Safeguarding Human Health in the Anthropocene Epoch was published by Cambridge University Press in 2021.

He chaired the Rockefeller Foundation/ Lancet Commission on Planetary Health which was set up to assess the potential implications for health of multiple interacting environmental changes affecting the Earth's 'essential life support systems' and publishing its findings in 2015. He co-chaired (with Prof. Joanna Haigh) the Academy of Medical Sciences/ Royal Society working group on 'A healthy future - tackling climate change mitigation and human health together' that reported in 2021.

He currently co-chairs the InterAcademy Partnership (over 140 member science academies worldwide) working group on climate change and health. The group coordinated four regional assessments and a global synthesis report on the effects of climate change on health and the effects of climate change adaptation and mitigation actions on health. He co-chairs The Lancet Pathfinder Commission and broader Pathfinder Initiative with Helen Clark and Joy Phumaphi funded by the Wellcome Trust with support from the Oak Foundation. He was co-author of the Lancet Pathfinder Commission report on Pathways to a healthy net-zero future, published in The Lancet in November 2023.

He was also co-author of a publication on air pollution deaths attributable to fossil fuels, published in the BMJ. His current research includes the study of the effects of climate and other environmental changes on health together with research on health co-benefits of low carbon policies in sectors such as energy, transport, food and agriculture and housing. He has co-authored over 400 scientific articles, editorials, book chapters and reports.

== Honours ==
He is a Fellow of the Royal College of General Practitioners, the Royal College of Physicians, the Academy of Medical Sciences; an Hon. Fellow of the Faculty of Public Health, Hon. Fellow of University College London and Fellow of King's College London. He was knighted for services to medicine in 2005. He was also made a foreign Associate member of the US Institute of Medicine of the National Academies in 2007 (currently National Academy of Medicine of the USA).

Other awards include: Hon. Fellow of the Philippine Academy of Family Physicians; Hon. Member of the National Academy of Medicine of Mexico; Hon Life Direct Member World Organisation of Family Doctors (WONCA); Fellow of the Royal Society of Biology; Springer Nature Visiting Professorship, Indian Academy of Sciences 2019; Fellow of the Royal Society for Public Health (RSPH); Hon. Fellow of the American Public Health Association (APHA) (following 'Exchange of Honours' between RSPH and APHA in 2019).

He was awarded the 2022 Tyler Prize for Environmental Achievement.
