= Million Women Study =

Research study

- Type of project: Medical research
- Founder: Valerie Beral
- Funding: Medical Research Council; Cancer Research UK; National Health Service
- Website: www.millionwomenstudy.org

The Million Women Study is a study of women’s health analysing data from more than one million women aged 50 and over, led by Dame Valerie Beral and a team of researchers at the Cancer Epidemiology Unit, University of Oxford. It is a collaborative project between Cancer Research UK and the National Health Service (NHS), with additional funding from the Medical Research Council (UK).

One key focus of the study relates to the effects of hormone replacement therapy use on women's health. The study has confirmed the findings in the Women's Health Initiative (WHI) that women currently using HRT are more likely to develop breast cancer than those who are not using HRT.

Results from the Million Women Study, together with those of the WHI trial from the USA, have influenced national policy, including recent recommendations on the prescribing and use of hormone replacement therapy from the Royal College of Obstetricians and Gynaecologists and from the Commission on Human Medicines.

== Study design ==
The Million Women Study is a multi-centre, population-based prospective cohort study of women aged 50 and over invited to routine breast cancer screening in the UK. Between 1996 and 2001, women were invited to join the Million Women Study when they received their invitation to attend breast screening at one of 66 participating NHS Breast Screening Centres in the UK. At these centres, women received a study questionnaire with their invitation, which they were asked to complete and return at the time of screening. Around 70% of those attending the programme returned questionnaires and agreed to take part in the study, over 1 in 4 women in the UK in the target age group. The Million Women Study is the largest study of its kind in the world.

== Aims ==
The Million Women Study was set up with the aim of recruiting 1,000,000 women in the UK into a cohort study, to provide answers to the following questions:

- What effects do combined estrogen and progestogen hormone replacement therapy (HRT) preparations have on breast cancer risk?
- Are breast cancers detected at screening in women who have used HRT or oral contraceptives different in terms of size and invasiveness from the cancers detected in women who have never used these hormones?
- How does HRT use affect the efficacy of breast cancer screening?
- How does HRT use affect mortality from breast cancer and other conditions?

== Findings ==
=== HRT and breast cancer ===
Initial analysis of the results from over 1 million women in the Million Women Study appeared to confirm preliminary findings from other studies at the turn of the century finding that women currently using progestin-estrogen HRT were more likely to develop breast cancer than those who are not using HRT. This initial analysis received extensive press coverage. The initial reading of results showed that this effect is substantially greater for combined (estrogen-progestogen) HRT than for estrogen-only HRT; and that the effects were similar for all specific types and doses of estrogen and progestogen, for oral, transdermal and implanted HRT, and for continuous and sequential patterns of use. Current users of estrogen-progestogen HRT were at 2 fold increased risk of developing breast cancer, and current users of estrogen-only HRT appeared to have a 1.3 fold risk. Use of HRT by women aged 50–64 in the UK in the decade from 1993-2003 was estimated to have caused 20,000 extra breast cancers. Past users were not seen as having increased risk.

A reanalysis refuting the initial conclusion that HRT increased the risk of breast cancer, was published in a 2012 paper in the Journal of Family Planning and Reproductive Health Care. The paper's authors, led by Samuel Shapiro of the University of Cape Town, claimed that the study had not in fact establish a causal relationship between HRT and breast cancer, and that the original analysis had been flawed.

=== HRT and uterine cancer ===
It is well known that post-menopausal women who have not had a hysterectomy are at increased risk of cancer of the endometrium (the lining of the womb) if they take estrogen-only HRT. Follow up of over 700 000 women in the Million Women Study confirmed this and showed that the risk of endometrial cancer is also increased in women who take tibolone; but is not altered, or may even be reduced, in women taking combined estrogen-progestogen HRT. These effects depend also on a woman’s body mass index (BMI, a measure of obesity) such that adverse effects of tibolone and estrogen-only HRT are greatest in thinner women, and the beneficial effects of combined HRT are greatest in fatter women.

=== HRT and ovarian cancer ===
Results of the study show a small increase in risk of ovarian cancer in women taking HRT. Such an increased risk had been suspected from some previous studies, and has now been confirmed with the larger numbers available in this study. The findings come from analyses on 948,576 post-menopausal women in the study, followed up for about 5 years. Women currently taking HRT were at higher risk of developing and of dying from ovarian cancer than women not using HRT. Past users were not at increased risk. The risk in current users was increased about 1.2 fold; for every 1000 women using HRT, 2.6 developed ovarian cancer over 5 years, compared with 2.2 in those not taking HRT. The risk was the same for estrogen-only, combined estrogen-progestogen and other types of HRT (including tibolone) and did not vary by specific type of estrogen or progestogen, or between oral and transdermal (patch) administration.

These results are equivalent to one extra case of ovarian cancer for every 2500 women taking HRT, and one extra death from ovarian cancer per 3300 women taking HRT, over 5 years. Publishers of these studies say that the results need to be looked at in the context of the other risks and benefits of HRT. In particular, an estimation of the overall effect of HRT use on three common cancers in women: breast cancer, endometrial (womb) cancer and ovarian cancer. Together, these cancers account for about 4 in 10 cancers in women in the UK. According to the findings, in women aged 50–69, about 19 of these cancers will develop over 5 years in every 1000 women not taking HRT. In women taking HRT the estimate is for the number of cancers to be increased to about 31. The overall increased risk is higher in women using combined estrogen-progestogen HRT than in women using estrogen-only HRT because most of the overall increase is due to an increase in breast cancer, and users of combined HRT have a higher risk of breast cancer than users of estrogen-only HRT.

=== Alcohol and cancer ===
The study has also found that low to moderate alcohol consumption increases the risk of a variety of types of cancer in women, including breast cancer.

== Public health influence ==
Results from the Million Women Study, together with those from other studies such as the Women’s Health Initiative trial from the USA, have influenced national policy, including recent recommendations on the prescribing and use of hormone replacement therapy from the Royal College of Obstetricians and Gynaecologists and from the Commission on Human Medicines.

Public awareness of the study and its findings has led to significant behavioural changes, predominately resulting in the swift decline of HRT prescriptions throughout Europe and the US from 2003. In contrast to the increase in HRT prescriptions between 1991 and 1996, which remained stable through to 2001, sales of HRT fell by 50% between 2002 and 2005 following the publication of the Million Women Study and the Women's Health Initiative study.

A number of recent studies have shown that the Million Women Study continues to impact women’s health and behavioural patterns in Europe. Research examining breast cancer incidence trends in Sweden between 1997 and 2007, showed that the prevalence of HRT use in women aged 50–59 years decreased from a peak of 36% in 1999 to 9% in 2007, a parallel decrease in incidence of breast cancer was also reported between 2003 and 2007. A recent report assessing breast cancer incidence in Belgium between 2007 and 2008 also showed a significant drop in breast cancer incidence attributed to the decrease in HRT use in Belgium during and leading up 2008.
