= Josep Figueras =

Spanish physician, researcher and administrator

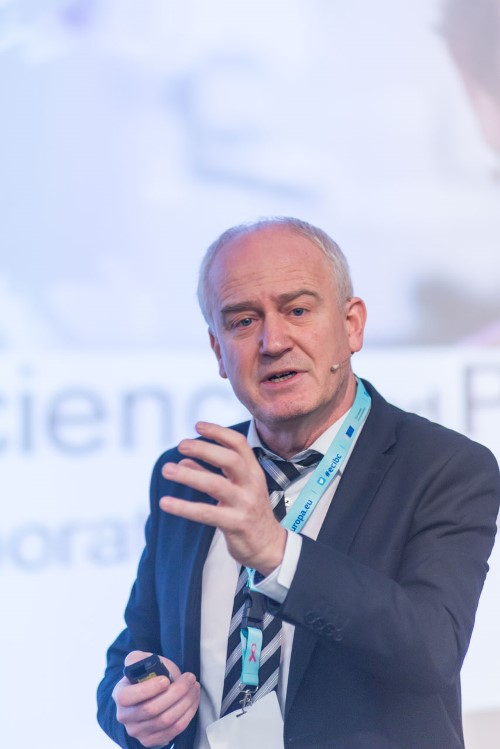
Josep Figueras speaking at the ECIBC

Josep Figueras Marimont (born in Medinya, 16 September 1959) is a health policy expert and retired international civil servant. He served as the director of the European Observatory on Health Systems and Policies until his retirement in December 2024.

== Biography ==
Born in Medinyà, Girona, Spain, Josep was educated at the University of Barcelona where he received his medical degree with honors in 1983, after which he specialized in family medicine in 1987 at the University of Valencia. He proceeded to move to the United Kingdom where he obtained a Master of Public Health from the University of Leeds, and a MSc and Ph.D. (econ) in health planning and financing from the London School of Economics and London School of Hygiene and Tropical Medicine, wherefore he worked as a lecturer and MSc course director in Health Services Management and Policy.

== Professional career ==
He was the Unit Head for the European Centre for Health Policy of the World Health Organization, later known as the European Observatory on Health Systems and Policies, a health policy research partnership of several governments and institutions. In this capacity, he advised in more than 40 countries within the European region and beyond and has served the European Commission and the World Bank. He is part of several governing, advisory and editorial boards, including the European Health Forum Gastein. He is currently a visiting professor at Imperial College London.

== Health systems and policies research ==
His research focuses on comparative health system and policy analysis. He is an editor of the Observatory series published by the Open University Press, and has published a wide range of volumes in this field, most recently: “Strengthening Health System Governance: Better policies, stronger performance” (2017); “Health systems governance” (2015); “Economic crisis: impact and implications for health systems policy in Europe” (2014); “Health systems, health and wealth: assessing the case for investing in health systems” (2012); “Health professional mobility and health systems. Evidence from 17 European countries” (2011); and “Cross-border health care in the European Union. Mapping and analyzing practices and policies” (2011). He is the originator and editor of the Health Systems in Transition (HiT) series, which introduces health systems in a common comparative framework.

== Honors and awards ==
Figueras is an honorary fellow of the Faculty of Public Health Medicine (United Kingdom) and was Director of the MSc in Health Services Management and lecturer at the London School of Hygiene & Tropical Medicine. In 2006 he received the Andrija Stampar Medal for excellence in Public Health and a Doctorate Honoris Causa from Semmelweis University in 2016. Figueras has twice been awarded the European Health Management Association (EHMA) prize for the best annual publication on policy and management.

== Select Bibliography ==
- Saltman, Richard B., Josep Figueras, and World Health Organization. "European health care reform: analysis of current strategies." (1997).
