= Phil Edwards (statistician) =

British academic working in road traffic injury prevention

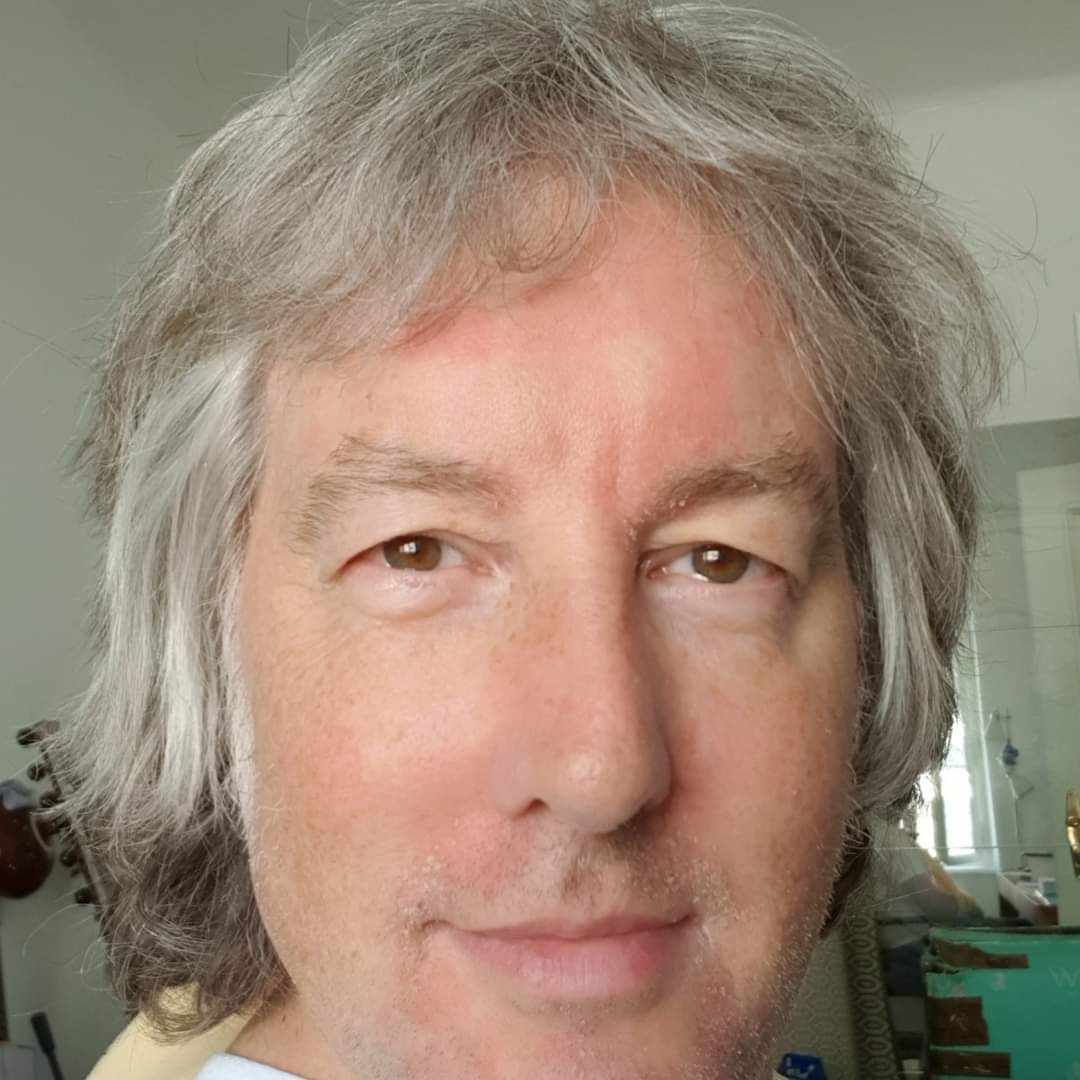
- Phil Edwards (2022)
- Occupations: Statistician, epidemiologist and academic

Academic background
- Education: BSc., Mathematics and Statistics; PhD., Epidemiology
- Alma mater: University of Warwick; London School of Hygiene and Tropical Medicine

Academic work
- Institutions: London School of Hygiene and Tropical Medicine

Phil Edwards is a British statistician, epidemiologist and academic. He is a Chartered Statistician of the Royal Statistical Society and a professor in the Department of Population health at the London School of Hygiene and Tropical Medicine (LSHTM).

Edwards' research focuses on the areas of injury epidemiology and prevention along with data collection methodology. He is the recipient of grants from institutions including the Department of Health and the National Institute for Health and Care Research.

== Education ==
Edwards earned a BSc in Mathematics and Statistics from the University of Warwick in 1988 and began working as a Research Officer at the Aston University Science Park, Birmingham until 1994, followed by an appointment as a Research Associate at the University of Newcastle. Between 1998 and 2005, he held the positions of Research Fellow at University College London (UCL) as well as Research Fellow and later Lecturer at LSHTM, where he also completed his PhD in epidemiology in 2004.

== Career ==
Edwards continued his academic career at the London School of Hygiene and Tropical Medicine as a Senior Lecturer. He was later appointed associate professor in the Department of Population Health in 2015 and has been serving as Professor since 2022.

== Research ==
Edwards' research spans data collection methodology, with a focus on the Cochrane Methodology Review aimed at enhancing response rates to questionnaires, alongside contributions to injury epidemiology and prevention, particularly in road safety and the epidemiology of construction site injuries in lower-income countries.

=== Injury epidemiology and prevention ===
Edwards researched injury epidemiology and prevention throughout his career. In a collaborative study, he investigated the impact of different street lighting adaptation strategies (switch off, part-night lighting, dimming, and white light) on casualties and crime in England and Wales, finding little evidence of harmful effects on road collisions or crime. He further explored public perceptions of reduced street lighting's health effects in England and Wales, showing concerns about safety, crime, and changes in the nighttime environment, alongside deeper anxieties about darkness and trust in local governance.

Conducting studies on Hyderabad, India, Edwards analysed school travel patterns among children aged 11–14, showcasing the prevalence of walking and cycling and emphasising the importance of safe environments for these modes of transport to mitigate road traffic injuries and air pollution. Additionally, he examined road traffic injuries among children during school trips in Hyderabad, finding a 17% prevalence with higher risk for boys and cyclists, emphasising the need for injury prevention. He also assessed how the density of minority ethnic populations in London affects child pedestrian injury risk, revealing a protective effect for certain groups and highlighting the role of area deprivation in injury risk across all ethnicities.

Also in India, Edwards has looked into construction site injuries. He noted a lack of research on the safety of women working on construction sites and conducted studies to address this gap in the literature.

=== Data collection methodology ===
Edwards' work on data collection methodology has focused on increasing response rates in self-administered questionnaires. Alongside colleagues, he revealed effective ways to increase response rates to postal and electronic questionnaires in epidemiological research, focusing on incentives, personalisation, and questionnaire design, with certain factors boosting response rates and others hindering them. Furthermore, he addressed the importance of well-designed questionnaires in clinical trials to enhance data quality, completeness, and minimise bias, urging for additional research to evaluate strategies and guidelines.

== Selected articles ==
- Edwards, P., Roberts, I., Clarke, M., DiGuiseppi, C., Pratap, S., Wentz, R., & Kwan, I. (2002). Increasing response rates to postal questionnaires: systematic review. BMJ, 324(7347), 1183.
- Woodcock, J., Edwards, P., Tonne, C., Armstrong, B. G., Ashiru, O., Banister, D., ... & Roberts, I. (2009). Public health benefits of strategies to reduce greenhouse-gas emissions: urban land transport. The Lancet, 374(9705), 1930–1943.
- Free, C., Phillips, G., Galli, L., Watson, L., Felix, L., Edwards, P., ... & Haines, A. (2013). The effectiveness of mobile-health technology-based health behaviour change or disease management interventions for health care consumers: a systematic review. PLoS medicine, 10(1), e1001362.
- Shakur, H., Roberts, I., Fawole, B., Chaudhri, R., El-Sheikh, M., Akintan, A., ... & Loto, O. (2017). Effect of early tranexamic acid administration on mortality, hysterectomy, and other morbidities in women with post-partum haemorrhage (WOMAN): an international, randomised, double-blind, placebo-controlled trial. The Lancet, 389(10084), 2105–2116.
- Yadav, S. S., Edwards, P., & Porter, J. (2021). The incidence of construction site injuries to women in Delhi: capture-recapture study. BMC Public Health, 21, 1–8.
- Edwards, P. J., Roberts, I., Clarke, M. J., DiGuiseppi, C., Woolf, B., & Perkins, C. (2023). Methods to increase response to postal and electronic questionnaires. Cochrane database of systematic reviews, (11).
