= European Public Health Association =

Organization of public health associations and institutes in Europe founded in 1992

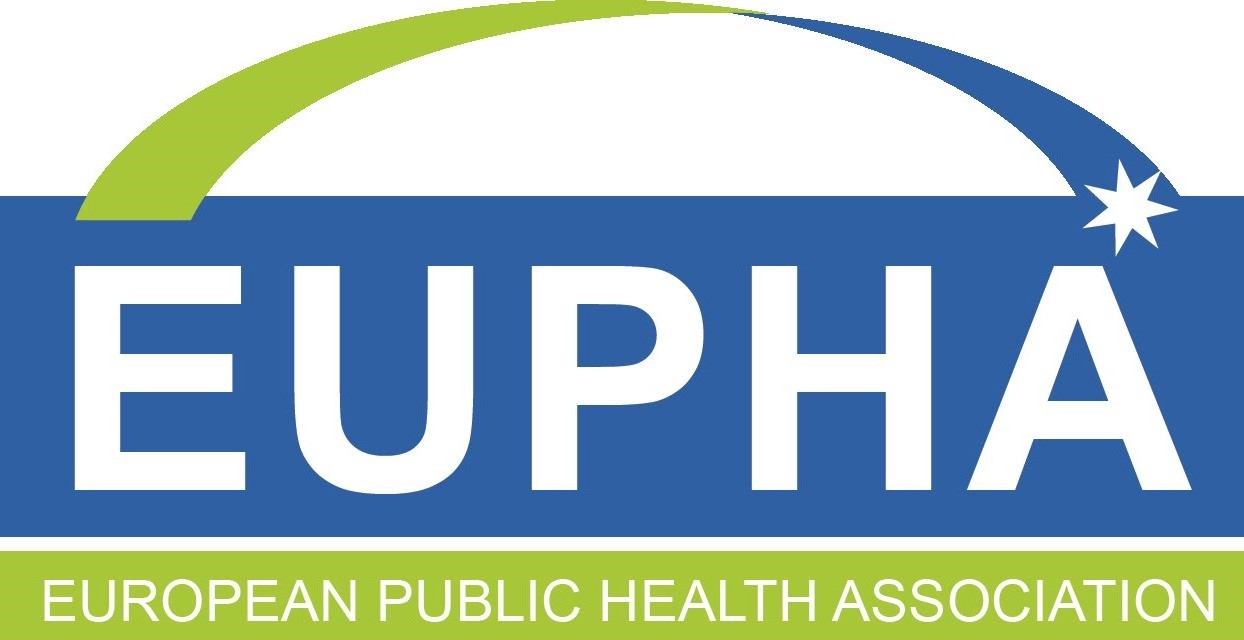
- Founded: 1992; Utrecht, Netherlands
- Type: Non-governmental organization
- Purpose: Public health
- Location: Utrecht, Netherlands (international)
- Region served: Europe
- Method: research, lobbying
- Members: 85 (>39,000 public health professionals) (2023)
- Key people: Dineke Zeegers, Executive Director; Iveta Nagyova, President; Martin McKee, Past-President
- Website: www.eupha.org

The European Public Health Association (EUPHA) is an organization of public health associations and institutes in Europe. It was founded in 1992.

Its central office is based at the NIVEL (Nederlands instituut voor onderzoek van de gezondheidszorg) in Utrecht, Netherlands. EUPHA also has a satellite office in Brussels, Belgium.

EUPHA is co-funded by the Health Programme of the European Union, and is registered with the EU Transparency Register under No. 37673629826-90.

== Members ==
EUPHA has two sorts of membership: full membership, which is open for national public health associations in Europe (WHO/EURO definition of Europe) and the associate membership, open for individuals, international NGOs and public health institutions. As of 2023, EUPHA has 85 members from 47 countries, bringing together over 39,000 public health experts.

=== Pillars ===
In order to better support the activities of EUPHA and to include all aspects of public health, EUPHA has created four pillars to link EUPHA sections and EUPHA members. These pillars reflect the four working areas of public health: research, policy, practice, and training and education.

== European Public Health Conference ==
EUPHA has been organising annual scientific conferences since 1992. The first conference was held in Paris in December 1992. Since 2008, the annual conference name was changed to "European Public Health Conference", as the conferences are a joint effort with national public health associations and international partners. The EPH Conference usually takes place in different European cities every year.

In autumn of 2020, together with the World Federation of Public Health Associations (WFPHA) and the Italian Society of Hygiene, Preventive Medicine and Public Health (SItI), EUPHA had to organize the first online-only meeting, at the same time 13th EUPHA, and the 16th World Congress on Public Health. Motto was: 'Public health for the future of humanity: analysis, advocacy and action'.

In 2021, during the Covid-19 pandemic also, the virtual-only meeting, the 14th EPH Conference explored "Public Health futures in a changing world".

Further annual in presens and online pan-european conferences were:

- 2022 15th - Berlin, Germany
- 2023 16th - Dublin, Ireleand
- 2024 17th - Lisbon, Portugal
- 2025 18th - Helsinki, Finnland

== Journal ==
EUPHA publishes a bi-monthly scientific journal, the European Journal of Public Health, together with Oxford University Press. In 2021, the Impact Factor is of 2.391 and the 5 year Impact Factor of 3.134.

The editor-in-chief is Peter Allebeck, from the Karolinska Institute and Stockholm County Council, Sweden.
