= 1982 Birthday Honours =

British government recognitions

Queen's Birthday Honours are announced on or around the date of the Queen's Official Birthday in Australia, Canada, New Zealand, and the United Kingdom. The dates vary, both from year to year and from country to country. All are published in supplements to the London Gazette and many are conferred by the monarch (or her representative) some time after the date of the announcement, particularly for those service people on active duty.

The 1982 Queen's Birthday Honours lists for the United Kingdom and the lists for Australia, New Zealand, Barbados, Mauritius, Fiji, Papua New Guinea, Solomon Islands, Tuvalu, St Vincent and Grenadines, Antigua & Barbuda, were issued on 11 June 1982.

== United Kingdom ==
=== Life Barons and Baronesses ===
- Miss Elizabeth Patricia Carnegy, Chairman, Manpower Services Commission, Committee for Scotland.
- Joseph Gormley, O.B.E. Lately President, National Union of Mineworkers.
- Sir Raymond William Pennock. Formerly President, Confederation of British Industry.

=== Privy Counsellors ===
- Robert Washington, The Earl Ferrers, Minister of State, Ministry of Agriculture, Fisheries and Food.
- James Hector Northey (Hamish) Gray, M.P., Minister of State, Department of Energy. Member of Parliament for Ross and Cromarty.
- Bryant Godman Irvine, M.P., lately First Deputy Chairman of Ways and Means and a Deputy Speaker, Member of Parliament for the Rye Division of East Sussex.

=== Knights Bachelor ===
- Gordon Johnson Borrie, Director General, Office of Fair Trading.
- George Roland Chetwynd, C.B.E., Chairman, Northern Regional Health Authority.
- David English, Editor in Chief, Associated Newspapers, Editor Daily Mail.
- Basil Samuel Feldman. For Political Service in Greater London.
- Leslie Fowden, Director, Rothamsted Experimental Station, Harpenden.
- Professor Lawrence Burnett Gowing, C.B.E. For Services to Art.
- Peter James Frederick Green, Chairman of Lloyd's.
- Fred Hardman, M.B.E. For Political and Public Service.
- Paul Lancelot Hawkins, T.D., M.P. For Political and Public Service.
- John Austin Hungerford Leigh Hoskyns, Formerly Head of the Prime Minister's Policy Unit.
- (John) Robin Ibbs, lately Head of the Central Policy Review Staff, Cabinet Office.
- Geoffrey Johnson Smith, M.P. For Political and Public Service.
- Christophor Charles Fraser Laidlaw, Chairman, International Computers Ltd.
- Ian Alexander McGregor, C.B.E. For services to Tropical Medicine.
- Maitland Mackie, C.B.E. For public services in Scotland.
- Denis Alfred Marshall, President of The Law Society of England and Wales.
- Walter Charles Marshall, C.B.E., Chairman, United Kingdom Atomic Energy Authority.
- Peter McLay Mills, M.P. For Political and Public Service.
- Professor John Harold Plumb, Historian.
- (James) Gordon Robson, C.B.E., Professor of Anaesthetics, Royal Postgraduate Medical School, University of London.
- Lawrence William Robson. For Political and Public Service.
- Walter Hans Salomon, Founder and Treasurer of "Young Enterprise".
- John Reynolds Mayhew-Sanders, Chairman, John Brown plc. For services to Export.
- William Arthur Shapland, Chairman, Blackwood Hodge plc.
- Michael Norman Shaw, D.L., M.P. For Political and Public Service.
- Jack Smart, C.B.E., Chairman, Association of Metropolitan Authorities.
- Alan Smith, C.B.E., D.F.C, D.L., Chairman and Chief Executive, Dawson International plc.
- William Oulton Wade. For Political and Public Service in North West England.
- Ian James Wallace, C.B.E. For Political Service in the West Midlands.

Diplomatic Service and Overseas List

- Clement Athelston Arrindell, Governor of St Kitts-Nevis.

Australian States

State of Queensland
- Jack Frederick Leggo, D.F.C. For services to motoring and the community.

=== The Most Honourable Order of the Bath ===
==== Knight Grand Cross of the Order of the Bath (GCB) ====
- Admiral Sir John Fieldhouse, K.C.B.
- General Sir John Stanier, K.C.B., M.B.E., A.D.C. Gen., Colonel Commandant Royal Armoured Corps, Colonel The Royal Scots Dragoon Guards (Carabiniers and Greys).
- Air Chief Marshal Sir Keith Williamson, K.C.B., A.F.C., Royal Air Force.
- Sir Peter Willoughby Carey, K.C.B., Permanent Secretary, Department of Industry.

==== Knight Commander of the Order of the Bath (KCB) ====
Military Division

Royal Navy

- Vice Admiral Simon Alastair Cassillis Cassels, C.B.E.
- Vice Admiral John Michael Holland Cox.
- Lieutenant General Sir Steuart Pringle, Bt.

Army

- Lieutenant General Alexander Crawford Simpson Boswell, C.B.E., (397816), Colonel The Argyll and Sutherland Highlanders (Princess Louise's).
- Lieutenant General Edward Arthur Burgess, O.B.E., (393092), Colonel Commandant Royal Regiment of Artillery.
- Lieutenant General Robert Francis Richardson, C.V.O., C.B.E., (408020), Colonel The Royal Scots (The Royal Regiment).
- Lieutenant General Richard Brooking Trant, C.B., (383269), Colonel Commandant Royal Regiment of Artillery, Colonel Commandant Royal Army Educational Corps.

Royal Air Force

- Air Marshal Ian Maurice Pedder, O.B.E., D.F.C., Royal Air Force.

`Civil Division

- Trevor Poulton Hughes, C.B., Permanent Secretary, Welsh Office.
- George Walker Moseley, C.B., Permanent Secretary, Department of the Environment.
- William Sinclair Ryrie, C.B., Second Permanent Secretary, H.M. Treasury.

==== Companion of the Order of the Bath (CB) ====
Military Division

Royal Navy

- Rear Admiral Robert Michael Burgoyne.
- Rear Admiral Alexander Peter Comrie.
- Surgeon Rear Admiral (D) Philip Reginald John Duly, O.B.E., Q.H.D.S.
- Rear Admiral John Bethell Hervey, O.B.E.

Army

- Major General Derek Boorman (411897), late The Staffordshire Regiment (The Prince of Wales's).
- Major General Trevor Stuart Hart, Q.H.P. (417772), late Royal Army Medical Corps.
- Major General William Michael Ellis Hicks, O.B.E. (393169), late Coldstream Guards.
- Major General Patrick Herbert Lee, M.B.E. (397961), late Corps of Royal Electrical and Mechanical Engineers.
- Major General Christopher John Popham (362368), late Corps of Royal Engineers.
- Major General William Nigel James Withall (414720), late Corps of Royal Engineers.

Royal Air Force

- Air Vice-Marshal John Bernard Fitzpatrick, Royal Air Force.
- Air Vice-Marshal Walter John Herrington, Royal Air Force (Retired).
- Air Vice-Marshal Henry Reed-Purvis, O.B.E., Royal Air Force Regiment.
- Air Vice-Marshal Michael Maurice Jeffries Robinson, Royal Air Force.

Civil Division

- James Frederick Barnes, Deputy Chief Scientific Adviser (Projects), Ministry of Defence.
- Kenneth Anthony Bradshaw, Clerk Assistant, House of Commons.
- Lawrence Henry Brandes, lately Under Secretary, Department of Education and Science.
- John Cormack, Under Secretary, Department of Agriculture and Fisheries for Scotland.
- Philip Cousins, Deputy Secretary, Exchequer and Audit Department.
- David Levric Davies, O.B.E., lately Under Secretary, H.M. Procurator General and Treasury Solicitor's Department.
- Duncan Sheppey Davies, lately Chief Engineer and Scientist, Department of Industry.
- James David Fergusson, Assistant Comptroller, Patent Office.
- John Waterston Furness, Under Secretary, Department of Transport.
- Peter Graham, Parliamentary Counsel.
- Julian George Kelsey, Deputy Secretary, Ministry of Agriculture, Fisheries and Food.
- Alfred Walter Mabbs, lately Keeper of Public Records.
- Stanley Walter Midwinter, Under Secretary, Department of the Environment.
- Peter Rogerson Oglesby, Deputy Secretary, Department of Health and Social Security.
- William George Henry Quigley, Permanent Secretary, Department of Finance and Personnel, Northern Ireland.
- Derek Rippengal, Q.C., Counsel to the Chairman of Committees, House of Lords.
- Keith Henry Westcott Thomas, O.B.E., Chief Executive, Royal Dockyards, Ministry of Defence.
- Reginald Norman Williams, Under Secretary, Department of Health and Social Security.

Australian States

State of Western Australia
- Robert David Davies, C.V.O., R.D., J.P. For public service.

=== Order of St Michael and St George ===
==== Knight Grand Cross of the Order of St Michael and St George (GCMG) ====
- Sir Curtis Keeble, K.C.M.G., H.M. Ambassador, Moscow.

==== Knight Commander of the Order of St Michael and St George (KCMG) ====
- Sir Antony Acland, K.C.V.O., C.M.G., Permanent Under-Secretary of State, Foreign and Commonwealth Office and Head of H.M. Diplomatic Service.
- Julian Leonard Bullard, C.M.G., Foreign and Commonwealth Office.
- Richard Edmund Clement Parsons, C.M.G., H.M. Ambassador, Madrid.
- Richard James Stratton, C.M.G., British High Commissioner, Wellington.
- John Robert Williams, C.M.G., British High Commissioner, Nairobi.

==== Companion of the Order of St Michael and St George (CMG) ====
- His Honour William Arnold Sime, M.B.E., Q.C., lately Senior Judge, Sovereign Base Areas Administration, Cyprus.
- Andrew Thomas Wilson, Assistant Secretary, Overseas Development Administration.
- Nicholas John Barrington, C.V.O., Head of British Interests Section, Royal Swedish Embassy, Tehran.
- Michael Crowley Crowley-Milling, lately Director, LEP Project, Centre for European Nuclear Research, Geneva.
- Alexis Porter, O.B.E., Counsellor, H.M. Embassy, Paris.
- The Honourable Eustace Hubert Beilby Gibbs, Foreign and Commonwealth Office, H.M.Vice-Marshal of the Diplomatic Corps.
- David Howe Gillmore, Foreign and Commonwealth Office.
- Christopher Leslie George Mallaby, Minister-designate, H.M. Embassy, Bonn.
- Peter Malcolm Maxey, H.M. Ambassador, East Berlin.
- Michael Ramsay Melhuish, Counsellor, H.M. Embassy, Warsaw.
- Michael John Newington, H.M. Consul-General, Düsseldorf.
- Terence David O'Leary, British High Commissioner, Freetown.
- Michael Keith Orlebar Simpson-Orlebar, Minister, H.M. Embassy, Rome.
- Duncan Slater, H.M. Ambassador, Muscat.
- David Churchill Thomas, H.M. Ambassador, Havana.

Australian States

State of South Australia
- Robert Leo Seppelt. For service to the wine industry.

=== Royal Victorian Order ===
==== Dame Grand Cross of the Royal Victorian Order (GCVO) ====
- The Most Noble Mary Kathleen, The Dowager Duchess of Abercorn, D.C.V.O.

==== Dame Commander of the Royal Victorian Order (DCVO) ====
- The Honourable Mary Anne Morrison, C.V.O.

==== Knight Commander of the Royal Victorian Order (KCVO) ====
- Lieutenant-Colonel Simon Claud Michael Bland, C.V.O.
- Lieutenant Commander Peter Richard Buckley, C.V.O., Royal Navy.
- Henry George Reginald Molyneux, Lord Porchester, K.B.E., D.L.
- Richard Lyall Sharp, C.B.

==== Commander of the Royal Victorian Order (CVO) ====
- Lady Mary Katherine Fitzalan-Howard, M.V.O.
- George Albert Harris, M.V.O., M.B.E.
- Colin Vyvyan Peterson,
- John Edward Powis Titman, M.V.O.

==== Member of the Royal Victorian Order (MVO) ====
- Francis Sedley Andrus.
- Commander John Hamilton Cracknell, Metropolitan Police.
- Leonard Geale Dickson.
- Alain Chartier Edmond Joly de Lotbinière.
- Major Nicholas Skerratt Lawson.
- Commander John Henry Stuart Mcanally, Royal Navy.
- Commander Richard Nicholas Margrave Paige, Royal Navy.
- Sydney Richards.
- Peter Scott Dunn.
- Captain Ashe George Russell Windham, Irish Guards.
- Graham Henry Bish.
- Anthony Joseph Charlton.
- Chief Yeoman Warder Robert Hugh Harton.
- Miss Susan Louise Hay.
- Captain (Local Major) Graham Anthony Clifford Hoskins, Royal Marines.
- Margaret Hannah, Mrs. Kennerley.
- John Alexander Murray.
- Derek Roy Mackay Ottowell.
- Arthur John William Scovell.

=== Royal Victorian Medal (RVM) ===
==== Royal Victorian Medal (Silver) ====
- Miss Margaret Rachel Coleman.
- Frederick William Henry George Cottrell.
- Sergeant Major Charles Frank Edward Crickmore, The Queen's Bodyguard of the Yeomen of the Guard.
- Richard Laurence Day.
- Police Constable James Hazeldine, Metropolitan Police.
- Lionel Thomas Mann.
- Yeoman Bed Hanger Frederick George Marsh, M.B.E., The Queen's Bodyguard of the Yeomen of the Guard.
- Humphrey Massey.
- Rene Henri Meylan.
- Yeoman Bed Hanger James Peart, The Queen's Bodyguard of the Yeomen of the Guard.
- Sergeant Major Frank George Pickford, The Queen's Bodyguard of the Yeomen of the Guard.
- Police Constable John Pillans, Metropolitan Police.
- Patrick Ryan.
- Arthur George Wakefield.
- Chief Technician Brian James Walton, Royal Air Force.

=== Companion of Honour ===
- Professor Sir Karl Raimund Popper. For services to philosophy.

=== Order of the British Empire ===
==== Knight Commander of the Order of the British Empire (KBE) ====
Military Division

- Air Marshal David William Atkinson, Royal Air Force.

==== Commander of the Order of the British Empire (CBE) ====
Military Division

Royal Navy

- Commodore Samuel Clarke Dunlop, M.B.E., Royal Fleet Auxiliary.
- Captain William Stanley Gueterbock, A.D.C., Royal Navy.
- The Right Reverend Monsignor Vaughan Frederick John Morgan, V.G., Royal Navy.
- Captain John Patrick Bruce O'Riordan, Royal Navy. .

Army

- Brigadier Ian Alexander Christie, O.B.E., M.C. (443414), late The King's Own Scottish Borderers.
- Brigadier Michael Frederick Hobbs, O.B.E. (447271,) late Grenadier Guards.
- Colonel Leslie John Philip Morrish (437126), late The Royal Hampshire Regiment.
- Brigadier Noel Thomas Anthony Ridings (438306), Royal Pioneer Corps.
- Reverend Robin Roe, M.C., Chaplain to the Forces 1st Class (445206), Royal Army Chaplains' Department (now R.A.R.O.).
- Brigadier William Paine Sheppard, M.C, T.D., D.L. (403682), late Yorkshire Volunteers, Territorial Army (now R.A.R.O.).
- Brigadier John Francis Thomas, O.B.E. (346187), Corps of Royal Military Police.
- Brigadier Anthony Chester Vivian (422472), late The Royal Welch Fusiliers.
- Colonel Keith Stephen Barnard Wintle, O.B.E. (412103), late Royal Regiment of Artillery.

Royal Air Force

- Air Commodore Geoffrey Bryning Tyler, M.B.E., Royal Air Force.
- Group Captain Michael John Pilkington, Royal Air Force.
- Group Captain Michael James Douglas Stear, Royal Air Force.
- Group Captain William John Wratten, A.F.C., Royal Air Force.

Civil Division

- Clifford Wallace Adam, Senior Principal Inspector of Taxes, Board of Inland Revenue.
- Cyril James Anderton, Q.P.M., Chief Constable, Greater Manchester Police.
- John Malcolm Barr, Chairman, Barr and Wallace Arnold Trust plc.
- Alec Victor Bedser, O.B.E. For services to Cricket.
- Harry Peter Neville Benson, M.C., lately Chairman, A.P.V. Holdings plc. For services to Export.
- Miss Jeanne Mary Bisgood, Chairman, Dorset Education Committee.
- David Blacktop, O.B.E., Commandant, Fire Service College.
- Neville Bruce Alfred Bosworth, Leader, Birmingham City Council.
- George Stephen Brosan, T.D., Director, North East London Polytechnic.
- Anthony Frederick Burbidge, M.B.E., Senior Technical Adviser, Ministry of Defence.
- Denis James Burrell, Managing Director, Martin Baker Aircraft Company Ltd. For services to Export.
- John Blackstock Butterworth, D.L., Vice-Chancellor, University of Warwick.
- John Bell Cameron, President, National Farmers' Union of Scotland.
- John Freeman Chatfield. For Political and Public Service in South East England.
- Guy Tresham Checketts, Chairman, South East Asia Trade Advisory Group, British Overseas Trade Board. For services to Export.
- Francis Kenneth Chorley, Deputy Chairman and Managing Director, Plessey Electronics Systems Ltd. For services to Export.
- Professor Robert Francis Churchhouse, For services to the teaching of computer science.
- William Arthur Conlon, M.B.E. For services to young people in Northern Ireland.
- Frederick Howard Michael Craig-Cooper, T.D. For Political Service in London.
- Ivor John Croft, Assistant Secretary, Home Office.
- William Scott Crosby, lately Chairman, Grampian Health Board.
- Michael James Stephen Cubbage, M.B.E., lately General Manager, Printing Works, Bank of England.
- William Keith Davidson. For services to Medicine in Scotland.
- David Lewis Davies, Chairman, The Attendance Allowance Board.
- Brian John Fiddes, Assistant Secretary, Scottish Education Department.
- Stanley Alfred Field, President, William Baird plc.
- George Malcolm Ford, Member, The British National Oil Corporation.
- Godfrey St. George Montague Gompertz. For services to the Anglo-Korean Society.
- Anthony Gross (Imre Anthony Sandor Gross), Artist.
- Abner Borthwick Hadden, Senior Principal Inspector of Taxes, Board of Inland Revenue.
- Fred Brian Harrison, Board Member, National Coal Board.
- Harry Cyril Harrison, Chairman, Simon Engineering Ltd. For services to Export.
- James Burns Hawthorne, Controller, Northern Ireland, British Broadcasting Corporation.
- John Stacpoole Haycraft. For services to Language Education.
- Leslie Edwin Henderson, Director Middle Band, Department of the Environment.
- Stuart Alan Bulmer Heppell, City Architect, Manchester.
- Arthur James Herbert. For Political and Public Service in Eastern England.
- Jack Hill, Chairman, John Williams Foundries Ltd. For services to the Foundry Industry Training Committee.
- Joseph Hood. For Political and Public Service in North West England.
- James Thomas Ireland, D.L. For services to local government and the community in Buckinghamshire.
- David Jack, Research and Development Director, Glaxo Holdings Ltd.
- William George Jewers, O.B.E., Member for Finance, British Gas Corporation.
- John Arthur Charles Kelsey, Assistant Secretary, Lord Chancellor's Department.
- Charles Alfred Kirkman, lately Under Secretary, Medical Research Council.
- John William Laws, Director of Radiology, King's College Hospital, London.
- Rosamond Nina Lehmann, (The Honourable Mrs. Philipps), Writer.
- William Gerald Eric Lewis, Deputy Chief Scientific Officer, Ministry of Defence.
- Farquhar Macintosh, Chairman, Scottish Examination Board.
- Donald McLean, Director, Scotland, Rolls-Royce Ltd.
- Daniel Maskell, O.B.E. For services to Lawn Tennis.
- Colonel John George Mathieson, T.D., D.L., lately Chairman, Highland Territorial, Auxiliary and Volunteer Reserve Association.
- John Drake Matthews, Professor of Forestry, University of Aberdeen.
- Brian Alfred Maynard, lately Chairman, Advisory Committee on Local Government Audit.
- John Phillimore Mitchell, T.D., Professor of Surgery, University of Bristol.
- Douglas Wellesley Morrell, Deputy Managing Director, Racal Electronics Ltd.
- The Right Honourable Charles Edward, Baron Mowbray and Stourton. For Political Service.
- David Nicholas, Editor and Chief Executive, Independent Television News.
- Joseph Alexander Patton, lately President, Ulster Farmers' Union.
- Daniel Norton Idris Pearce, T.D. For Political Service.
- Peter John Pearson, Chairman, Central Horticultural Committee, National Farmers' Union.
- Roger James Pincham, For Political Service.
- Miss Margaret Berenice Price, Singer.
- Ralph Alexander Raphael, Professor of Organic Chemistry, University of Cambridge.
- John Armstrong Raven, Chief Executive, Simplification of International Trade Procedures Board. For Services to Export.
- Joan Marguerite, Mrs. Reeve. For Political Service in the North of England.
- Sydney Verdun Robinson, lately Director, Ranks Hovis McDougall plc.
- The Honourable Miriam Louisa Rothschild (The Honourable Mrs. Lane). For services to taxonomy.
- Stanley John Sadie, Musicologist and Critic, Editor, The New Grove Dictionary of Music and Musicians.
- John Stephen Sadler, Member, Monopolies and Mergers Commission.
- Narindar Saroop. For Political service.
- Peter Francis Scott. For public services in Cumbria.
- Nigel Snodgrass. For services to veterinary medicine.
- Michael David Snoxall, Head of Legal Services, Unilever plc.
- Francis Sullivan, Assistant Secretary, Office of the Parliamentary Commissioner for Administration, Northern Ireland.
- Frank Martin Hussey Taylor. For Political Service.
- William Taylor, Director, University of London Institute of Education.
- Wyndham Thomas, General Manager, Peterborough New Town Development Corporation.
- Alexander Cuthbert Turnbull, Nuffield Professor of Obstetrics and Gynaecology, University of Oxford.
- Madeleine Freda, Mrs. Vaughan, O.B.E. For services to local government in West Glamorgan.
- Sammy Wainwright, Deputy Chairman, The Post Office and Managing Director, National Girobank.
- Philip John Walker, Assistant Secretary, Department of Energy.
- John Sackfield Wallwork, lately Managing Director, Northcliffe Newspapers Group Ltd.
- William Watson, Professor of Chinese Art and Archaeology, University of London.
- Miss Dorothy May Webster, President, Royal College of Midwives.
- Brian Weigh, Q.P.M., Chief Constable, Avon and Somerset Constabulary.
- David Thomson West, Assistant Secretary, Department of Employment.
- David Williamson, lately Keeper of the Registers of Scotland.
- Ronald Marshall Wilson, Partner, Bell-Ingram, Perth.
- Miss Priscilla Helen Ferguson Young, Director, Central Council for Education and Training in Social Work.

Diplomatic Service and Overseas List

- William Bailey. O.B.E., D.S.C., G.M. For services to British commercial interests in Portugal.
- Edward Fitzgerald Brenan, M.C. For services to Anglo-Spanish cultural relations.
- Robert Webster Ford, H.M. Consul-General, Geneva.
- Victor Alfred Ladd, Commissioner for Inland Revenue, Hong Kong.
- Theodore Lionel Mander. For services to British commercial interests in New York.
- Derek Maxwell March, O.B.E., Senior British Trade Commissioner, Hong Kong.
- Miss Felice Morgenstern, lately Assistant Legal Adviser, International Labour Organisa- tion, Geneva.
- Michael Graham Ruddock Sandberg. For public services in Hong Kong.
- Archibald Zimmern, Justice of Appeal, Hong Kong.

Australian States

State of Queensland

- Commander David John Robertson, Royal Australian Navy (Retired). Private Secretary to the Governor.

State of South Australia

- William Allan Rodda, M.P. For service to politics.

State of South Australia

- Ella Osborn, Mrs. Fry. For service to the arts.

==== Officer of the Order of the British Empire (OBE) ====
Military Division

Royal Navy

- Commander Michael Cecil Boyce, Royal Navy.
- Commander David John Dacam, Royal Navy.
- Captain Robert Michael Eddleston, R.D.*, A.D.C., Royal Naval Reserve.
- Commander Edward David Michael Floyd, Royal Navy.
- Commander Brian Herbert Green, Royal Navy.
- Major Christopher James Hickinbotham, Royal Marines.
- Commander John Hickson, Royal Navy.
- Commander Victor David Jefferson, Royal Navy.
- Commander Arthur David Colquhoun Lund, Royal Navy.
- Commander Roger Wilfred Morris, Royal Navy.
- Lieutenant Colonel Samuel Pope, Royal Marines.
- Commander Ronald Shannan Stevenson, Royal Navy.
- Commander John Bryan Young, Royal Navy.

Army

- Lieutenant Colonel Christopher Norman Rea Bateman (439589), Royal Regiment of Artillery.
- Lieutenant Colonel Giles Barthrop Bateman (457675), The Queen's Regiment.
- Lieutenant Colonel John Charles Horatio Sprague Byrne (443689), The Green Howards (Alexandra, Princess of Wales's Own Yorkshire Regiment).
- Lieutenant Colonel Anthony Neil Carlier (454995), Corps of Royal Engineers.
- Acting Colonel (now Honorary Colonel) Roy Chapman, D.L. (240423), Army Cadet Force, Territorial Army (now Retired).
- Lieutenant Colonel William Michael Crawshaw (463982), Corps of Royal Engineers.
- Major (Acting Lieutenant Colonel) (Director of Music) George Edwin Evans (480835), The Blues and Royals (Royal Horse Guards and 1st Dragoons).
- Lieutenant Colonel (Staff Quartermaster) William Joseph Fitzgerald (480160), Corps of Royal Electrical and Mechanical Engineers.
- Lieutenant Colonel (Quartermaster) Peter McNaughton (481069), Royal Corps of Signals.
- Lieutenant Colonel Michael Robert Methven Newall (426964), The Queen's Regiment.
- Lieutenant Colonel Arthur Hugh Reid, T.D. (481130), The Royal Irish Rangers (27th (Inniskilling) 83rd and 87th), Territorial Army.
- Lieutenant Colonel Kulwant Bir Singh Sethi, T.D. (488370), Royal Army Medical Corps, Territorial Army.
- Lieutenant Colonel Alfred John Smith (441553), The King's Regiment.
- Lieutenant Colonel Simon Robin Alonzo Stocker (465839), The Royal Regiment of Wales (24th/41st Foot).
- Lieutenant Colonel (Quartermaster) Alexander Walker (473602), The Argyll and Sutherland Highlanders (Princess Louise's).
- Lieutenant Colonel Anthony Albert Ward (465851), Royal Army Ordnance Corps.

Air Force

- Wing Commander George Leonard Aylett (607605), Royal Air Force.
- Wing Commander Benjamin Wakely Ball (4335006), Royal Air Force.
- Wing Commander Nicholas Timothy Carter (4335169), Royal Air Force.
- Wing Commander Peter Dodworth, A.F.C. (2617263), Royal Air Force.
- Wing Commander John Victor Emery (609173), Royal Air Force.
- Wing Commander Geoffrey Stuart Findlay (2608505), Royal Air Force.
- Wing Commander David Robert Green (608238), Royal Air Force.
- Wing Commander Roy Francis Harris (507608), Royal Air Force.
- Wing Commander Alan Charles Edwin Holbourn (4154427), Royal Air Force.
- Wing Commander Charles O'Reilly (579766), Royal Air Force.
- Wing Commander Geoffrey John Oxlee (3517322), Royal Air Force.
- Wing Commander Anthony Edward Ryle, A.F.C. (505723), Royal Air Force.

Civil Division

- George Fritz Werner Adler, Director, British Hydromechanics Research Association.
- Stanley Airey, Member, Liverpool City Council.
- John Allen. For public services in Northern Ireland.
- John Derek Allpress. For Political Service in the East of England.
- Edward Wilfred Allsop, Director Mobil Oil Company Ltd.
- Miss Eileen Mary Anderson. For services to Ice-Skating.
- Charles Arthur Ansell, D.L. For public services in the South West.
- Robert Ralston Armour, Assistant Director, Scottish Development Department.
- Bernard John Aylward, President, National Association for Design Education.
- Walter Robert Ballantyne, President, Scottish Youth Hostels Association.
- Roger Charles Walter Bardell, Secretary General, British Insurance Association.
- Harry Noel Barwick, lately Director, The Guinness Trust.
- Michael Bendix, D.L. For public service in Essex.
- Andrew Carmichael Bennett. For services to the Earl Haig Fund (Scotland).
- Colonel Harold Frederick Oberlinne Bewsher, Director General, The Scotch Whisky Association.
- Miss Elizabeth Blackadder (Elizabeth Violet, Mrs. Houston), Painter.
- Elaine, Mrs. Blond. For public and charitable services.
- John McMillan Boon, Chairman, Water Companies Association.
- John Wallace Booth, lately Deputy Collector, Board of Customs and Excise.
- John Noel Bowen, Chairman, Llangollen International Music Eisteddfod.
- Elizabeth Eleanor, Mrs. Simpson-Brass, Area Organiser, North East Division, Area 1 Northumbria, Women's Royal Voluntary Service.
- Kelvin Arthur Bray, Managing Director, Ruston Gas Turbines Ltd. For services to Export.
- Michael Vaughan Brian, Senior Principal Scientific Officer, Natural Environment Research Council.
- Norman Trevor Brint, lately Principal Profes sional Technology Officer, Ministry of Defence.
- Peter Francis Thomas Bromwich, Chairman, Warwickshire Association of Boys' Clubs.
- Rabbi Solomon Brown. For service to the community in Leeds.
- Megan Patricia, Lady Bull, Governor, HM Prison, Holloway.
- Kathleen Beatrice, Mrs. Butler. For Political Service.
- Miss Margaret Mary Byrne, lately Nurse Member, Kent Area Health Authority.
- William Black-Campbell, Member, Tropical Africa Advisory Group, British Overseas Trade Board. For services to Export.
- Miss Joyce Lilian Carey, Actress.
- Miss Alison Joan Boyd-Carpenter, Member, National Society for Epilepsy.
- Guy Lawrence Gordon-Clark, Chairman, West Sussex Probation and After-Care Committee.
- Mae Calder, Mrs. Cochrane, lately President, Scottish Amateur Swimming Association.
- Evelyn Marguerite, Mrs. Cockburn. For Political and Public Service in Scotland.
- Gerard Anthony Dillon Coghlan, Chairman, West Midlands Council for School Works Links.
- Jeffrey Thrale Collins, Director, Chemical Industries Association Ltd.
- John Frederick Norman Collins, County Planner, Cheshire County Council.
- Joseph Elliott Needham Cooper, Pianist and Broadcaster.
- Neil Cossons, Director, Ironbridge Gorge Museum Trust.
- John Vincent Courtney, Inspector Grade I, Department of Agriculture for Northern Ireland.
- Joseph Samuel Craig, Managing Director, UIE Shipbuilding (Scotland) Ltd.
- John Robert Creer, For public services in the Isle of Man.
- James Basil Damer, Director-Secretary, Finance Houses Association.
- Christopher Guy Vere Davidge, President, Amateur Rowing Association.
- John Arthur Davies, D.F.C., H.M. Inspector of Schools, Department of Education and Science;
- John Egerton Claridge De Morgan, lately Chairman, Liaison Health and Safety Committee, Plastics Processing Industry.
- Ronald Harry Devon, For services to the community in Poole, Dorset.
- Kevin Joseph Donaghy, Chief Legal Adviser, Central Services Agency, Northern Ireland.
- Alastair Geoffrey Donald, Chairman of Council, The Royal College of General Practitioners.
- Charles Donnet, National Industrial Officer, Local Authorities and National Health Services Section, National Union of General and Municipal Workers.
- John Alfred Hugh Edmonds, Leader, Dudley Metropolitan Borough Council.
- Gordon Ernest Faulkner, For Political and Public Service in the East Midlands.
- Charles Miller Fenton, Managing Director, British Belting Asbestos Group plc.
- Claudia, Mrs. Flanders, Consultant, National Bus Company.
- Oswald William Fletcher, Editor, The Sporting Life.
- Thomas Ernest Trevor Forbes, Assistant Chief Constable, Royal Ulster Constabulary.
- Robert Baxter Garland, Member, Foundries Economic Development Committee.
- Joseph Albert Gerber, Headmaster, Newquay Tretherras School, Cornwall.
- Miss Angela Mary Gould, Regional Nurse, Personnel and Training, Wessex Regional Health Authority.
- Major Ian Robert Grimwood, For services to the conservation of wildlife overseas.
- Arnold Hadwin, Editor, Telegraph and Argus, Bradford.
- Alan Arthur Haggar, M.B.E. For services to the magistracy in Southampton.
- Alexander Dunlop Haley, Managing Director, W. E. Wassell Ltd. For services to Export
- Ronald Marsden Harvey, Senior Ear, Nose and Throat Surgeon, Altnagelvin Hospital, Londonderry.
- Leo Cyrus William Hobbis, Head of Science Division, Science and Engineering Research Council.
- Clare Hollingworth, For services to Journalism.
- Kenneth John Holloway, Principal Scientific Officer, Ministry of Defence.
- Joseph Erskine Holmes, Director, Northern Ireland Federation of Housing Associations.
- Miss Florence Hooton, Cellist.
- Raymond William Horner, T.D., lately Deputy Director and Chief Engineer, Rivers Branch, Department of Public Health Engineering, Greater London Council.
- Miss Ethel May Houston, Solicitor, Balfour and Manson, Edinburgh.
- Angela Winifred, Mrs. Hughes, Farmer, Dorset
- William Ernest Gifford Humphrey, D.F.C., Director, Community of St. Helens Trust.
- Norman Waltham Hussey, Senior Principal Scientific Officer, Glasshouse Crops Research Institute.
- Noel Irwin, Vice President and Director, Hughes Tool Company Ltd., Belfast
- James Thomson Jardine, Chairman, Police Federation of England and Wales.
- John Elfed Jones, lately Principal, Tameside College of Technology, Ashton-under-Lyne
- John William Jones, D.F.C., District Inspector of Mines and Quarries, Department of Employment
- Joseph Kevin Keegan. For services to Association Football.
- Peter Kemp, Chairman, National Egg Packers' Association Ltd.
- Arthur Trevor Kimber, D.F.M., Headmaster, Hill crest County Secondary School, Hastings.
- Miss Joan Alison Kirby, lately Headmistress, Haberdashers' Aske's Hatcham Girls' School, London.
- James Geoffrey Kirk, Director of Public Relations, National Coal Board.
- The Honourable Verona Vandeleur Kitson, M.B.E., T.D., lately Chairman, Riding for the Disabled Association.
- James Knipe, Superintending Grade Engineer, Department of Health and Social Security.
- Derek Tudor Laws. For Political Service.
- William John Leaman, Director, Engineering and Operations, Forth Ports Authority.
- Colonel Gerald Austin Leech, T.D., County Engineer and Surveyor, North Yorkshire County Council.
- Simon Cyril Levene, Inspector (SP), Board of Inland Revenue.
- Basil Roy Lewis. For Political Service.
- Leslie Alfred Kingcome Lidstone. For Political service in South East England.
- Miss Anne Pitcairn Little, lately Area Nursing Officer, City and East London Area Health Authority.
- John Reginald Llewelyn, Principal, Export Credits Guarantee Department.
- Cyril Charles Lucas. For services to the fishing industry and to Export.
- Peter Archibald McCaig, Personnel Director, Brush Electrical Machines Ltd,
- Joan, Mrs. Macharg, lately Strathclyde Regional Organiser, Women's Royal Voluntary Service.
- John Macleod, D.L., Principal, Lews Castle College, Stornoway.
- Charles Maurice Stewart Maguire, lately Chief Mechanical and Electrical Engineer, Southern Region, British Rail.
- James Forbes Main, Chairman, Export Division, Rowntree Mackintosh pic. For services to Export.
- Leonard Sulla Manasseh, Architect.
- Gordon Leslie May, Secretary, British Gas Corporation.
- John James Milbourn, Senior Adviser (Science), Cleveland Local Education Authority.
- William Brown Miller, Managing Director, Prestwick Circuits Ltd., Ayr.
- Gillian Margaret Mary, Mrs. Miscampbell. For Political and Public Service in Wessex.
- Brian Scott Moffat, Director, Port Talbot Works, BSC Strip Mill Products, British Steel Corporation.
- Joseph Reginald Moore, Professor of Oral Surgery, University of Manchester.
- Professor Edwin George Morgan, Poet.
- John Elwyn Morgan, Superintending Grade Engineer, Department of Transport.
- David Cameron Morrell, Wolfson Professor of General Practice, St. Thomas' Hospital Medical
- Henry Cecil Morris (Henry Vernon Thomas Flint), Director of Development, CLASP Development Group.
- Leonard Roy Moxam, M.B.E., Divisional Director, Flight Operations, Westland Helicopters Ltd.
- Denis Frederic Ellison Nash, A.E., Medical Adviser, Shaftesbury Society.
- Arthur George Negus. For services to the appreciation of antiques.
- Cecil Henry Stafford Northcote. For Political and Public Service in the West Midlands.
- Miss Elizabeth Orr, lately Senior Principal Research Officer, Overseas Development Administration.
- Ernest John Edward Owttrim, lately Senior Principal, Ministry of Defence.
- John Aidan Packer, Managing Director, Reid & Taylor, Langholm.
- Kenneth Francis Paddock, Chief Pipelines Inspector, Department of Energy.
- Kenneth William Nicholls Palmer, E.R.D., T.D., Commander, Essex, St. John Ambulance.
- Commander John Pechell Parker, R.N. (Retd), For Political Service.
- Christopher Eugene Parsons, Head of Natural History Unit, Network Production Centre, British Broadcasting Corporation.
- Douglas Alexander Pask, V.R.D., Director General, South Western Region, Central Electricity Generating Board.
- Miss Dorothy Joyce Quatermaine Pearce, M.B.E., For services to the Ockenden Venture.
- Geoffrey Frederick Phillips, Senior Principal Scientific Officer, Laboratory of the Government Chemist.
- John Comer Powell, lately Headmaster, Blackwood Comprehensive School, Gwent.
- Frederick Horace Pues, County Branch Director, Suffolk, British Red Cross Society.
- Dorothea Margaret, Mrs. Raikes. For services to the Welsh Water Authority.
- Peter Bessone Raymond, Chairman and Director of Raymond Companies.
- Basil Roberts, Q.F.S.M., Chief Officer, Dorset Fire Brigade.
- Robert Marshall McIntosh Robertson, Manager, Armaments Department and Local Director, Vickers Shipbuilding Engineering Ltd.
- Frank Alexander Robson, Chairman and Managing Director, Ladies Pride plc. Leicester.
- Kenneth Rogers, Chairman, Road Haulage Association.
- Edward Charles Roose. For Political and Public Service in the West of England.
- Charles Doig Scott, Member, Board of Governors, North of Scotland College of Agriculture.
- David John Heywood Senior, Head of Home Affairs and Press Departments, London Chamber of Commerce and Industry.
- Arthur Shillitto, Chairman, Froude Engineering Ltd. For services to Export.
- Professor Lionel Louis Shreir. For services to corrosion science.
- Peter Shrives, lately Controller of Stamp Design, Post Office.
- Leslie Howard Silver, Chairman, Silver Paint and Lacquer (Holdings) Ltd. For services to Export.
- Graeme Maxwell Simmers, Chairman, Scottish Highland Hotels.
- Brian Charles Simpson, Director, Dunlopillo Europe, Dunlop Ltd.
- Group Captain Alexander Smart, B.E.M., Chief Security Adviser, Shell UK Ltd., and Group Security Consultant, Shell International Petroleum Company Ltd.
- John Iain Freeland Smith, Principal Air Traffic Engineer, Civil Aviation Authority.
- Joseph Ernest Smith, lately Director, Supplies Division, Common Services Agency, Scottish Health Service.
- Miss Margaret Campbell Gordon Smith, Adviser in Primary Education, Grampian Region.
- Norman Stanley Smith. For Political and Public Service in the North of England.
- Peter Wallis Smith, Deputy Chief Constable, Norfolk Constabulary.
- Philip Spackman, Inspector (SP), Board of Inland Revenue.
- John Henry Fryer-Spedding, Vice-Chairman, Calvert Trust (Challenge for the Disabled) Ltd.
- William Ord Stephenson, M.B.E., D.L. For public services in the North East.
- Major Laurence Edwards Stringer, T.D., Chairman, Headquarters General Purposes Sub-Committee, Scout Association.
- Stanley Sutcliffe, Principal Adviser (Curriculum) Rnowsley Local Education Authority.
- Alec Clifton-Taylor. For services to the study of architecture.
- James Taylor, Assistant Director Engineer, Ministry of Defence.
- Colonel James Taylor, M.C., T.D., Member, Argyll and Bute District Council.
- John Roland Taylor, Superintending Building Surveyor, Department of the Environment.
- Martin Thomas, Q.C. For Political Service.
- Charles William Tranter, Senior Principal, Ministry of Agriculture, Fisheries and Food.
- Peter Charles Trietline, Director of Social Services, Durham County Council.
- Leslie Clement Troup, Conservator of Forests, Forestry Commission.
- Lawrence Frederick Turner, Chairman and Managing Director, Static Systems Group Ltd.
- Ellen Clare, Mrs. Turquet, formerly Vice-Chairman, Board of Governors, Royal National Throat, Nose and Ear Hospital.
- Jean Margaret, Mrs. Tyrrell, Group Chairman, Sirdar pic.
- Gladys Annie, Mrs. Vause, Head Teacher, Two Dales School, Guiseley.
- John Riding Waddington, Senior District Inspector, Manchester Local Education Authority.
- William Milbourn Wannop. For Political and Public Service in the North of England.
- Alan Arthur Wells, Director-General, The Welding Institute.
- George Ambrose Wheatcroft. For services to the International Optometric and Optical League.
- Russell Gabe Wilkinson, Chairman, Kidney Research Unit for Wales Foundation.
- Alfred Charles Williams. For services to the community in Shropshire.
- David Alun Williams, Entertainer. For service to broadcasting.
- Barry Ernest Willis, Secretary, Amateur Athletic Association.
- Edward Arthur Winstanley, Principal, Board of Inland Revenue.
- Margaret, Mrs. Wood, Member, Glenrothes Development Corporation.
- Peter Wright, Deputy Chief Constable, Merseyside Police.

Diplomatic Service and Overseas List

- Nicolas Clark Adamson, lately First Secretary, H.M. Embassy, Islamabad.
- Richard Wigram Locke Austin. For services to British commercial interests in Australia.
- William Hubert Mullard Ayers. For services to British commercial interests and the British community in Israel.
- Joseph Richard Backhouse, H.M. Consul, British Consulate-General, Los Angeles.
- Patrick John Fox Barrett, First Secretary, British High Commission, Kuala Lumpur.
- Dr. Jack Barrott, British Council Representative, Warsaw.
- Arthur Beevers. For services to British commercial interests in Papua New Guinea.
- John Edward Bishop. For services to British commercial interests in Malawi.
- William Charles Langdon Brown. For public services in Hong Kong.
- John Joseph Caetano, Finance Officer, Gibraltar.
- Dr. James Somerville Cambell, Medical Officer, British High Commission, New Delhi.
- Dr. George Choa. For public services in Hong Kong.
- Michael John Copson, First Secretary (Commercial) H.M. Embassy, Bahrain.
- Paul Melville Corfe, Principal Magistrate, Hong Kong.
- Arthur Alexander Edmondson, lately British Council Representative, Buenos Aires.
- Godfrey John Garrett, First Secretary, H.M. Embassy, Stockholm.
- Group Captain Cecil Edgar Arthur Garton, [Royal Air Force] (Retired), Honorary British Consul, Funchal, Madeira.
- Peter Alan Harrison, lately Regional Director, British Council, Barcelona.
- Grace Irene Tsin-kiu, Mrs. Ho. For public services in Hong Kong.
- Nigel Oliver Hudson, lately Cultural Attache (British Council), H.M. Embassy, Rangoon.
- Miss Peggy Eileen Lambe, lately First Secretary (Accountant) H.M. Embassy, Washington.
- Professor John Alain Leisten. For services to university education in Malawi.
- Dr. Isobel Patricia Mackenzie. For Medical and welfare services to the community in Tanzania.
- Miss Christine Elizabeth Nuttall, English Language Officer, British Council, Malaysia
- Professor Eldryd Hugh Owen Parry. For ser vices to university education in West Africa.
- Richard Edgar Quine, Q.P.M., C.P.M., Senior Assistant Commissioner, Royal Hong Kong Police Force.
- Theresa Terry, Mrs. Tucker, M.B.E. For public and community services in Bermuda.
- Robin Twite, British Council Regional Representative, Calcutta.
- Lieutenant Colonel John Hill Watson (Retd), Public Safety Adviser, British Military Government, Berlin.
- Samuel White. For services to journalism in France and to Anglo-French relations.

Australian States

Queensland

- John Keith Howes. For service to building societies, business and the community.
- James William McKay, D.S.C. For services to television and the community.
- Arthur Charles Rogers. For service to the business community.
- Ian Murray Russell. For services to business and the community.

South Australia

- Heino Lomp. For services to ethnic community activities.
- Dr. Maurice James Wilson Sando. For services to anaesthesia and intensive care.

Western Australia

- Athol Clifford Gibson. For service to spastics.
- Peter Morton Moyes. For service to education.

==== Member of the Order of the British Empire (MBE) ====
Military Division

Civil Division

- Peter Alder. For Political Service.
- Wing Commander Henry Allen, Secretary, Northern Ireland Headquarters, Royal Air Forces Association.
- David Allison, Chief Clerk of Works, Department of Commerce for Northern Ireland.
- William Daniel Anderson, E.R.D., lately Senior Executive Officer, Department for National Savings.
- John Harry Aram, Senior Scientific Officer, Science and Engineering Research Council.
- Dorothy, Mrs. Ashurst, Higher Executive Officer, Risley, British Nuclear Fuels Ltd.
- Albert Atkinson, lately Contracts Executive, Plessey Avionics and Communications Ltd. For services to Export.
- Miss Una Nora Austin. For services to the community in Aylesbury.
- Major Anthony Ayling, M.C., Retired Officer Grade II, Ministry of Defence.
- Geoffrey Clifford Bache, Member, West Midlands, Transport Users' Consultative Committee.
- Ernest Harold Bailey, Teacher, Highbury Fields School, London.
- Gordon Ballard. For Political Service in the West of England.
- John Victor David Banham, Assistant Divisional Manager, Derwent Division, Severn Trent Water Authority.
- Walter Banks, lately Chief Administrative Officer, Highlands and Islands Development Board.
- John Philip Bannister, D.F.C., lately Chief Executive, Jonwindows Ltd.
- Leslie Matheson, Mrs. Barker. For services to the community in Staffordshire.
- William George Barnden, lately Principal Doorkeeper, House of Commons.
- Donald James Barnett, Chief Environmental Health Officer, Bristol City Council.
- John Leonard Bate, Head of Department of Library and Information Resources, Napier College of Commerce and Technology, Edinburgh.
- Lieutenant Commander Donald Lawrence Baxter, R.N.(Retd.), Retired Officer Grade II, Ministry of Defence.
- Miss Nadine Dagmar Beddington, Architect.
- Ernest Beeston, Chairman, Kendal Brewery Arts Centre Trust.
- Miss Margaret Ethel Bell, Staff Officer, Department of Finance and Personnel, Northern Ireland.
- John Norman Denys Bettley, lately Secretary, Britain-Nigeria Association.
- Margaret Mary, Mrs. Bicker, Member, Ayrshire and Arran Health Board.
- Mary Ann Florence, Mrs. Biswell, for services to the community in Bedfordshire.
- Robert Blake, B.E.M., lately News Manager, Manchester Daily Express.
- William Blanckley, Treasurer, Hetton District Aged Miners' Homes Committee.
- Charles Henry Bowdler, Deputy Secretary, London Region, National Graphical Association.
- Graham William Bowen, Managing Director, Compugraphics International Ltd.
- Charles James Bowers, Director of Finance and Administration, Manchester International Airport Authority.
- Faith, Mrs. Bowring. For Political and Public Service in South East England.
- Mary Cecilia, Mrs, Maxwell-Bradley, Area Nurse (Child Health), Manchester Area Health Authority.
- Miss Margaret Rosemary Briggs, lately Education Officer, General Nursing Council of England and Wales.
- Rex Brinkworth, Educational Director, Down's Children's Association.
- Miss Queenie (Annie) Brockman. For Political Service.
- Roger William Middleton Bromley, Chief Superintendent, Metropolitan Police.
- Brian Sydney Brookes, Warden, Kindrogan Field Centre, Scottish Field Studies Association.
- Miss Winifred Bruce, Higher Executive Officer, Scottish Education Department.
- Joseph Buckley, Higher Executive Officer, Department of Employment.
- Allan Ray Caird, lately Vice-President, Firth of Forth Fishermen's. Association.
- James Kevin Callaghan, lately Assistant Head Postmaster, Oldham Head Post Office, North Western Postal Board, Post Office.
- Robert John Canter, Speaker's Trainbearer and Assistant Secretary to the Speaker, House of Commons.
- Molly Rose Thekla, Mrs. Carpenter, Services Welfare Member, 6th QEO Gurkha Rifles, Women's Royal Voluntary Service.
- Miss Amicia Vere Carroll. For services to child care, particularly in Hampshire.
- John Vernon Chadwick, lately Stores Officer Grade ' A ', Ministry of Defence.
- Robert Champion, lately National Hunt Jockey.
- Stella Mayne, Mrs. Chappel. For services to the community in Winchelsea.
- Marion Elsie, Mrs. Cheal, lately Senior Matron, Civil Service Benevolent Fund.
- Leslie Thomas Chester, Farmer, Foxt, Staffordshire.
- Miss Ann Margaret Childs, Secretary and Information Officer, Flowers and Plants Council.
- Miss Edna Mary Christopher, Area Nurse, Child Health/Local Authority Liaison, Berkshire Area Health Authority.
- Daisy Dorothy, Mrs. Clark. For charitable services in Newcastle upon Tyne.
- Antony Dewhirst Cliff. For Political Service in Yorkshire.
- Walter Vivian Cole, Potter.
- Florence Muriel, Mrs. Collings. For Political and Public Service in Wessex.
- Miss Betty Elizabeth Gibbs Collins, Chairman, Education Board, College of Occupational Therapists.
- Miss Margaret Corrin, Officer in Charge, Hampton Court House, (Home for the Elderly).
- Michael John Courtney, Distribution Engineer, Barnstaple Local Office, Somerset Area, South Western Electricity Board.
- Bruce Charles Cova, Environmental Health Officer, London Borough of Hammersmith and Fulham.
- Gwendolen Dorothy, Mrs. Cowan, Personal Secretary, British Rail.
- Norah Marcie, Mrs. Croft, Secretary, MIND in Croydon.
- Miss Rhona Mary Cross, Superintendent, Northumbria Police.
- Anne, Mrs. Cumberbatch, Area Officer, Greater Manchester/East Cheshire, National Association of Citizens Advice Bureaux.
- Olive, Mrs. Currell, Executive Officer, Board of Customs and Excise.
- Miss Audrey Mary Davey. For services to handicapped and disabled people in Wales.
- Ronald Ernest Davey. For services to the Tiverton Youth Orchestra.
- Miss Elizabeth Marion Davies, Senior Executive Officer, Department of Employment.
- John Elwyn Davies. For services to the community in Dyfed.
- Kenneth Dixon, Senior Scientific Officer, Department of the Environment.
- Seymour Brantiner Dobson, Chief Superintendent, Royal Ulster Constabulary.
- William Leonard Dolan, Manager, International Group, Public Affairs and Information, British Petroleum Company pic.
- David Alfred Donley, lately Senior Executive Officer, Department of Health and Social Security.
- Ronald Duncan Parker Dony, Area Manager (Manpower and Industrial Relations), Remploy Ltd.
- Frederick Jack Doughty, Divisional Surveyor, Devon County Council.
- Rupert Doughty, Higher Executive Officer, Department of Health and Social Security.
- Noel Douglas, Scientific Officer, Ministry of Defence.
- Gladys, Mrs. Dutton. For services to the League of Friends of Worthing Hospital.
- Gwenllian Dwyryd (Miss Gwenllian Jones), Harpist.
- John Harrop Edgeley, lately District Service Manager, Rotherham District, East Midlands Region, British Gas Corporation.
- Arthur Thomas Siddaway Edwards. For services to Sport for the Disabled.
- John William Hay Elder, General Medical Practitioner, Annan.
- Geoffrey Engledow, Chief Technical Officer, Thermalite Ltd.
- Miss Jane Margaret Errington, Member, Executive Committee, Scottish Council for Spastics.
- Eric Evans. For Services to Rugby Football.
- Miss Joan Evett, Senior Nursing Officer, Bristol Royal Hospital for Sick Children, Avon Area Health Authority.
- Mary Elsie King, Mrs, Ewart, President, Westmorland, National Society for The Mentally Handicapped.
- David Herbert Falla, Youth Club Leader, Les Capelles Methodist Church, Guernsey.
- Graham Kirk Feltead, Technical Director, Kearney and Trecker Marwin Ltd.
- William Ferris, Western Area Manager, Ulsterbus Ltd.
- Albert Victor Fisher, Chief Draughtsman, Cossor Electronics Ltd.
- Nancy Garden, Mrs. Fleming. For services to nursery school education in Northern Ireland.
- Stanley George Ford, Executive Director, Devon Council on Alcoholism.
- Geoffrey Fraser, Executive Officer, Central Office of Information.
- Rosa Annie, Mrs. Freedman, Mayor, London Borough of Barnet.
- Elizabeth Mary, Mrs. Furnell, Secretary, Northamptonshire Group, Disabled Drivers' Association.
- Colin Charles Geeves, Deputy Clerk to the Justices, Mid-Hampshire Group.
- Eugene Genin. For services to music in Liverpool.
- Agnes Patricia, Mrs. Gibbons, lately Senior Personal Secretary, Department of Industry.
- Anthony Charles Gill, Chairman of Trustees, Police Convalescent Home, Hove.
- Geoffrey Glossop, Chairman, Midlectron Group of Companies.
- Richard Goodbody, Clerk, Earls Barton Parish Council, Northamptonshire.
- Major Hugh Valentine Heyland Gorton, lately Chief Inspector of Racecourses, Jockey Club.
- Thomas Henry Grice, Station Officer, Leicestershire Fire Service.
- Szlama Grunstein, General Medical Practitioner, Oldham.
- Mary Elyse, Mrs. Gueritz, Assistant Secretary, The British Institute of Persian Studies.
- Florence Emily, Mrs. Guest. For services to the community in Stourbridge and District.
- John Derek Guest, Managing Director, John Guest (Southern) Ltd.
- William Ernest Buckmaster Gunn, lately Branch Manager, Pickfords Removals Ltd.
- Doreen, Mrs. Hall, Executive Officer, Department of Transport.
- Orman de Rousset-Hall, Member, Post Office Users' National Council.
- Robert John Hamilton, Head of Dust Branch, National Coal Board.
- Edith Mary, Mrs. Hammond. For services to the community in Melton Mowbray.
- Derek Alfred Hancock, Headmaster, Talbot County Combined School, Dorset.
- Samuel Harkness, lately Chief Inspector, Royal Ulster Constabulary.
- David Harrison, Chief Commissioner of Scouts, Northern Ireland.
- Gwendolene Constance Ruth Jean, Mrs. Hawley, Secretary, Lewisham Division, Soldiers', Sailors' and Airmen's Families Association.
- Una Margaret, Mrs. Hehir, Personal Secretary, Department of Employment.
- James Craig Helm, Member, Scottish Agricultural Consultative Panel.
- Dorothy Evelyn, Mrs. Henderson, President, Woodlands Residents' Association, Glasgow.
- Edward Herbert, Principal Careers Officer, City of Coventry.
- Iris June, Mrs. Herlehy, Senior Executive Officer, Ministry of Defence.
- Geoffrey Edward Roland Heslop. For Political Service in the North of England.
- Derek James Hews, Managing Director, Holsworthy Electronics Ltd. For services to Export.
- John Hodgson, Member, Hastings Borough Council.
- John William Hollins. For services to Association Football.
- Nancy Margaret, Mrs. Howard. For services to the community in Fulwood, Preston.
- Miss Marjorie Howarth, Headmistress, Kirk Hallam Infants' School, Derbyshire.
- Patricia, Mrs. Hughes, Deputy Director, Staffordshire County Branch, British Red Cross Society.
- John Henderson Ingram, Methods Manager, Yarrow (Shipbuilders) Ltd.
- Eva Annie, Mrs. Jackson, Vice-President, Mapperley Hospital League of Friends, Nottingham.
- Errol Edward James, Chairman, Leeds Community Relations Council.
- John Edward Johnston, Chairman, Examination Board, Institute of Clerks of Works of Great Britain Incorporated.
- Robert John Johnston, Head of Agricultural Department, Northern Ireland, British Broadcasting Corporation.
- Hugh Frew Johnstone, Band Manager, Dalmellington Brass Band.
- Alan Jones. For services to Cricket in Wales.
- Edward James Jones, General Manager (Exports Eastern Europe), Gillette Industries Ltd. For services to Export.
- Mary Audrey, Mrs. Jones, Geriatric Community Liaison Officer, Lambeth, Southwark and Lewisham Area Health Authority.
- Miss Vera Jones, County Organiser, Brecknock Young Farmers' Clubs.
- Albert James Joscelyne, Senior Educational Adviser, Cheshire Local Education Authority.
- Leonard Thomas Joyce, lately Senior Research Assistant, Victoria and Albert Museum.
- Miss Muriel Pamela Jupp, Executive Officer, Ministry of Agriculture, Fisheries and Food.
- Robert Kemp, Chief Superintendent, Northern Constabulary.
- Rosa, Mrs. Kennedy, District Manager, Northern Ireland Housing Executive.
- dEdward Marshall Kerby, Senior Buyer (Provisions), Co-operative Wholesale Society Limited.
- Dorothy Joan, Mrs. Kerr, Member, Roxburgh District Council.
- Miss Margaret Joan King, Administrative Assistant, International Division, GEC-Marconi Electronics Ltd. For services to Export.
- William Charles Frederick Kirke, lately Principal Doorkeeper, House of Lords.
- William Kitchingham, Higher Executive Officer, Welsh Office.
- Margaret Adelaide Irene, Mrs. Kitchingman. For services to the community in Abbots Langley and District, Hertfordshire.
- Daniel Lamn, Chairman and Managing Director, D. Lamb and Company Ltd.
- John Lambden, lately Overseer of Mammals, Zoological Society of London.
- Cyril Ernest Larmour, General Secretary, Northern Ireland Association of Boys' Clubs.
- Brian Thomas Lawrence, Prison Visitor, H.M. Prison, Wakefield.
- Arthur Frederick Lawson, District Traffic Superintendent, Great Yarmouth and Lowestoft, Eastern Counties Omnibus Company Ltd.
- John McDougall Leggat. For services to the Boys' Brigade in Scotland.
- Helen Gladys, Lady Liddell. For services to the community in Finchampstead, Berkshire.
- Clarence Fred Linton. For services to Parish Councils in Sussex.
- George Sinclair Ross Little. For Political and Public Service in Wales.
- Miss Dorothy Margaret Livesey, Cashier, Company Headquarters, Rolls-Royce Ltd.
- Robert Gilchrist Lockhart, lately Deputy Chief Ship Surveyor, Lloyd's Register of Shipping.
- John Lowrie, General Manager, West of Scotland Trustee Savings Bank.
- Frederick George Luff, lately Higher Executive Officer, Church Commissioners for England.
- Samuel Wilmott Lunt, Chief Cartographic Draughtsman, Ministry of Agriculture, Fisheries and Food.
- Archibald Joseph Lynn, Charge Nurse, Musgrave Park Hospital, Northern Ireland.
- Claude Reginald Lyon. For Political Service in Eastern England.
- Miss Phyllis Joan McCarthy, Traffic Assistant, Southern Vectis Omnibus Company Ltd.
- Henry Charles McDonald. For services to the Officers' Association.
- Terence Alex McHaffie, Chief Training Officer (Dogs), Ministry of Defence.
- John Mackie, Member, Kirkcaldy District Council.
- Donald John MacLennan, Veterinary Surgeon, Isle of Skye.
- Elsie, Mrs. Ma'gilton, Senior Chiropodist, Eastern Health and Social Services Board, Belfast.
- William Anthony Makeham, Member, North Western Export Club. For services to Export.
- George Thomas Mallinson, Unemployment Review Officer, Department of Health and Social Security.
- Frederick James Mallion, Head of Smithfield Department of Food Technology, College for the Distributive Trades, London.
- Samuel Campbell Martin, lately Chairman, Ayrshire Dock Labour Board.
- Harold Mayes, Production Editor, ECC Publications.
- Stephen Albert Peter Mazza, Higher Catering Officer, Metropolitan Police.
- Hugh Menown, Manager, Gas Filled Tube Department, English Electric Valve Company Ltd. For services to Export
- Dorothy Gertrude, Mrs. Meredith. For Political and Public Service in North West England.
- Marjorie Henrietta, Mrs. Mickel. For Political and Public Service in Scotland.
- Donald Millar, lately Chief Photographer, Daily Record.
- George Charles Mills. For services to the community in Gloucestershire.
- Miss Kathleen Barry Milner. For services to music in North West Scotland.
- James Finlay Mitchell. For services to the Save the Children Fund in Northern Ireland.
- Sidney Philip Moncrieff, Assistant Chief Designer, Portsmouth Aviation Ltd.
- Miss Karen Jane Morse. For services to Water Ski-ing.
- Miss Mary Elizabeth Mountain. For Political Service in the East Midlands.
- Barbara Eva, Mrs. Mullins, Chief Superintendent of Typists, Board of Inland Revenue,
- Kenneth Murdoch, Senior Executive Officer, Department of Health and Social Security.
- George Murphy, B.E.M., Senior Probation Officer, Merseyside Probation and After-Care Service.
- Nichol Shiel Murray, Inspector (Higher Grade), Board of Inland Revenue.
- Elizabeth May, Mrs. Naylor. For Political and Public Service in Yorkshire.
- Elspeth Templeton, Mrs. Neil. For services to the community in Dunlop, Kilmarnock.
- William Herbert Newell, Administrator and Treasurer, Association of H.M. Inspectors of Schools in England and Wales.
- John Lewis Newing, Divisional Civil Engineer (South Eastern Division), British Rail.
- Anne Purdie, Mrs. Nicholson, Headteacher, Linnvale Primary School, Clydebank.
- Miss Rachel Elizabeth Norman, Senior Officer (Awards), Further Education Branch, Bedfordshire Local Education Authority.
- William Houghton Norris, Production Manager, Fabrications Division, Lucas Aerospace Ltd.
- Miss Shirley Ann Oxenbury. For Political Service.
- Frederick James Taylor Page, Vice President, British Deer Society.
- Edwin William Stranack Palmer, lately Foreign and Commonwealth Office.
- Harold Gilbert Parker, Deputy Wing Treasurer, Bristol Wing, Air Training Corps.
- Margaret Gray, Mrs. Parker, Member, Kilmarnock and Loudoun District Council.
- Albert Edward Parr, President, A. E. Parr and Son Ltd.
- George Roland Parvin, Director, IPC Business Press (Sales and Distribution) Ltd.
- Eiblin, Mary, Mrs. Paterson, Higher Executive Officer, Department of Health and Social Security.
- Colin Frederick Patterson, Personnel Director, Babcock Power Ltd.
- Miss Marjorie Edith Payne, lately Higher Executive Officer, Department of Health and Social Security.
- Lawrence Peace. For charitable services in Leicestershire.
- John Barrie Peacock, Road Safety Officer, North Yorkshire County Council.
- Kathleen Mary Frances, Mrs. Percy. For services to the National Trust in Limpsfield, Surrey.
- Albert Rodrigues-Pereira, lately Surveyor, Board of Customs and Excise.
- Stylianou Andreas Petrides, Local Executive Officer, District Works Office, Cyprus, Department of the Environment.
- Cecil Raymond Pettitt, Training Officer, Plessey Connectors Ltd.
- John Stanley Phillips. For services to the community in Cleveland.
- John Pilkington, Executive Officer (Welfare), Merseyside and North Wales Electricity Board.
- Edwin Anthony Piper, Principal Research Officer, Medical Research Council.
- Joan Gwynne, Mrs. Pitt, Senior Personal Secretary, Law Officers' Department.
- Charles Alfred Potts, Senior Librarian, Ministry of Defence.
- Edmund Poulsom, General Services Manager, Hull Works, BP Chemicals plc.
- Eileen Maria, Mrs. Pratt, Sister, Royal Infirmary, Sunderland Area Health Authority.
- Ronald Pritchard, Director, North Africa Area, Commonwealth War Graves Commission.
- Horace Wilfred Ransom. For services to the Mill Hill Toe H Music Club.
- Reginald Sydney Rawlings, Professional and Technology Officer I, Department of Health and Social Security.
- Frank Alfred Richards, Energy Manager, Steven-age Division, Dynamics Group, British Aerospace plc.
- Richard Hall Ingles Richardson, President, Phoenix Youth Club, Edinburgh.
- Jack Meikie Renton Richmond, For services to Shinty in Scotland.
- Alan Clive Roberts, T.D., Senior Scientific Officer, Bradford Area Health Authority.
- Commander David York Roberts, R.N.(Retd.), Master Trawler Support Ship, H.M. Coastguard, Department of Trade.
- George Robinson, Regional Operations Manager, Northumbrian Water Authority.
- Miss Frances Marian Rochat. For services to the community in-Finchley.
- William Gerald Callard Rogers. For Political Service in the West of England.
- Louis Joseph Rosin, General Medical Practitioner, Darlington.
- Efthalia, Mrs. Russell, Organiser, London Borough of Brent, Women's Royal Voluntary Service.
- Lionel Vivian Frank Russell, Senior Designer, Viriten Group Ltd. For services to Export.
- Joseph Antony Ryan, Senior Executive, Officer, Lord Chancellors Department.
- Joan, Mrs. Sage, Personal Secretary, Department of Health, and Social Security.
- Alfred Sidney James Salthouse, Higher Executive Officer Department of Employment.
- Miss Joan Blanche Sanger, lately Executive Officer, Ministry of Defence.
- Charles Samuel Scarff, Senior Executive Officer, Department of Health and Social Security.
- Margaret Ellen, Mrs. Scott, Welfare Officer, Peebles-shire Branch, British Red Cross Society.
- Thomas Wales Scott, Senior Estate Manager, Land Settlement Association.
- Raymond Wallace Seed, Supervisor of Warehouses, European Service, Navy, Army and Air Force Institutes.
- Miss Adeline Semple, Secretary to the Lord Mayor of Belfast.
- Stan Zdenek Sevenoaks, Export Sales Manager, Eurotherm Exports Ltd. For services to Export.
- Edith, Mrs Shaw, Night Sister, Bradwell Hospital, Staffordshire Area Health Authority.
- Laurence Anthony Shepherd, Commandant, No. 7 District Police Training Centre, South Wales Constabulary.
- John Edward Shinner, Member, Committees of British Pharmacopoeia Commission.
- Douglas Simpson, Manager, Research Laboratory, North of Scotland Hydro-Electric Board.
- Miss Brenda Mary Slaney, Principal Advisory Tutor, Institute of Advanced Nursing Education, Royal College of Nursing.
- Peter John Smail, Higher Executive Officer, Office of the Parliamentary Commissioner for Administration.
- Robert Charles Smallwood, Senior Executive Officer, Department of Employment.
- Alan Walter Ralph Smith, Harbour Master, Port of Tyne Authority.
- Audrey Elizabeth, Mrs. Smith. For services to handicapped children.
- Daphne, Mrs. Gloster-Smith. For services to Redhill and Reigate Citizens Advice Bureau.
- Horace John Smith, Deputy Chief Officer, NottinghamshireFire Service.
- John Smith, Administration Officer (Finance), Cartranspoft Ltd.
- Wilfred Eric Spark, Assistant Director, Northern Region, Confederation of British Industry.
- Henry.Herbert Standen, Editor; The Guinea Pig Club Magazine.
- Clifford Stanley, lately Fire and Safety Officer, Evode Ltd.
- Kenneth Oscar Steeper, Managing Director, Hugh Steeper Ltd.
- Lewis David Stevens. For Political and Public Service in the West Midlands.
- Miss Elma Elizabeth Stevenson, District Administrative Nursing Officer, Craigavon and Banbridge District, Southern Health and Social Services Board.
- Pearl Annette Evelyn, Mrs. Graham-Stewart. For Political and Public Service.
- James Stewart, Chief Nursing Officer, Moss Side Hospital, Department of Health and Social Security.
- Frederick John Stone, Chief Safety Officer, Hatfield Division, Dynamics Group, British Aerospace plc.
- Gwendoline Joyce, Mrs. Stott, Higher Executive Officer, Management and Personnel Office.
- Joseph Gerard Sudell, Senior Principal Administrator, Association of County Councils.
- Alan Bernard William Taylor, Director of Music, The Haberdashers Aske's School, Elstree.
- Frank Royle Taylor, Scientific and Technical Librarian and Information Officer, Manchester Central Library.
- Gordon William Taylor, General Medical Practitioner, Reading.
- Lenard George Idris Taylor, lately Chief Engineer, Sir William Reardon Smith and Sons Ltd.
- Dan Merlin Thomas, Chairman, Association of Community Health Councils for England and Wales.
- Miss Norma Cynthia Thomas, Personal Secretary, Board of Inland Revenue.
- William John Thompson, Superintendent, Royal Ulster Constabulary.
- Miss Patricia Margaret Thraves, Head of Physical Education Department, Thomas Alleyene's High School, Uttoxeter.
- Sheila, Mrs. Till, Senior Executive Officer, Board of Customs and Excise.
- Peter Toft. For services to The Children's Film Society.
- William Hamish Tough, Chairman and Managing Director, Scott and Fyfe Ltd.
- John Townley, Inspector (S), Board of Inland Revenue
- George Boris Townsend, Head of Engineering Information Service, Independent Broadcasting Authority.
- Herbert Turner. For services to the community in Glossop.
- Albert John Thomas Tyrrell. For Political and Public Service in Greater London.
- Terence Hardy Waite, Archbishop of Canterbury's Assistant for Anglican Communion Affairs.
- John Edward Westgarth-Walker, Chairman, Sunderland War Pensions Committee.
- Ronald Henry Walker, Senior Administrator and Records Officer, Basildon New Town Development Corporation.
- Alfred David George Wallen, Chief Superintendent, Devon and Cornwall Constabulary.
- Norman Percy Walton, Administrator, Middlefield Hospital, Solihull District Health Authority.
- Phyllis Jenny, Mrs. Wayne, Assistant Director, National Association of Master Bakers. Confectioners and Caterers.
- Leonard Walter Webb, Factory Manager, Molins Tobacco Machinery Ltd.
- Fred Albert Wedlake, Secretary and Development Officer, Somerset Small Industries Group.
- Allan Wipper Wells. For services to Athletics.
- Miss Beryl Marion White, Deputy County Superintendent, Buckinghamshire, St. John Ambulance Brigade.
- Cyril White. For services to the Royal British Legion in Princes Risborough, Buckinghamshire.
- Enid Faithfull, Mrs. Dalton-White. For services to the Mount Edgcumbe Hospice, Penrice, St. Austell.
- Amos Whittaker. For services to the blind in Swadlincote and District, Burton-on-Trent.
- John Francis Powell-Williams, lately Product Controller, Hawker Siddeley Dynamics Engineering Ltd.
- David Johnston Wilson, Head of Classics and Humanities, Monkwearmouth School, Sunderland.
- Jean Mary, Mrs. Wilson, Section Naval Auxiliary Officer, Preston Unit, Royal Naval Auxiliary Service.
- Drummond Alfred Window, Hygiene, Safety and Security Manager, RHM Bakeries (Northern) Ltd.
- Derick Gordon Wisbey, Senior Thatching Officer, Council for Small Industries in Rural Areas.
- Charles John Wray, Solicitor's Clerk, Hood, Voyes and Allwood, Solicitors, Dereham.
- Margery Charlotte, Mrs. Wright, Member, Tendring District Council.
- William Wright, Deputy General Works Manager, NEI Parsons Ltd. For services to Export.
- Miss Gladys Doreen Yeo, Senior Executive Officer, Ministry of Defence.
- The Reverend Canon Raymond Grant Young, lately Chaplain, Hampshire, Isle of Wight and Channel Islands Association for the Deaf.

Diplomatic and Overseas List

Australian States

Queensland

- Mabel Florence, Mrs. Clarke. For services to music.
- Councillor Colin Alan Littleton. For services to local government and the dairying industry.
- Alfred Louis Martinuzzi. For services to the community.
- Charles Robert Russell Roff. For services to the beekeeping industry.
- Reverend Frank John Cranch Stone. For services to the Church and the community.
- John Frederick Storr. For services to the accountancy profession.
- James Graham Ambrose Tucker. For services to the community.
- Councillor James Raymond Turner. For service to local government and the community.

South Australia

- Betty Joyce, Mrs. Figg. Honorary Director of Volunteers, Hillcrest Hospital.
- Kenneth Edward Gerard. For services to industry and the community.
- Ronald Wagstaff. For services to the community.

Western Australia

- Miss Judith Mildred Butt. For service to nursing.
- William Robert Jamieson. For service to viticulture.
- Catherine Ellen, Mrs. Martin. For service to medical journalism.
- Dorothy May, Mrs. Nordahl. For service to water sports.

=== Royal Red Cross ===
Member, First Class (RRC)

- Principal Nursing Officer Eileen Mary Northway, A.R.R.C., Queen Alexandra's Royal Naval Nursing Service.
- Colonel Jean Monica Adams, A.R.R.C. (422350), Queen Alexandra's Royal Army Nursing Corps.
- Lieutenant Colonel Elizabeth Ann Lattimore, T.D. (470568), Queen Alexandra's Royal Army Nursing Corps, Territorial Army.

Associate, Second Class (ARRC)

- Superintending Nursing Officer Julia Massey, Queen Alexandra's Royal Naval Nursing Service.
- Superintending Nursing Officer Isobel Easton Young, Queen Alexandra's Royal Naval Nursing Service.
- Major (Now Lieutenant Colonel) Sheila Margaret Cooper (456057), Queen Alexandra's Royal Army Nursing Corps.
- Major Eric Ernest Gruber (498378), Royal Army Medical Corps.
- Captain Trevor David Long (499916), Royal Army Medical Corps.
- Major Morag Mackenzie Stewart (455514), Queen Alexandra's Royal Army Nursing Corps.
- Squadron Leader Sheila Noreen Joy (408333), Princess Mary's Royal Air Force Nursing Service.
- Squadron Leader Patricia Daphne Surridge (408249), Princess Mary's Royal Air Force Nursing Service.

=== Air Force Cross (AFC) ===
- Lieutenant Commander David Ashley Poole, Royal Navy
- Lieutenant Commander Nigel David Ward, Royal Navy
- Squadron Leader Peter Jeffrey Chadwick (4231830), Royal Air Force.
- Squadron Leader David John Hemmings (687618), Royal Air Force.
- Squadron Leader William Arthur Langworthy (3516420), Royal Air Force.
- Squadron Leader Harry Mitford Liddell (1808535), Royal Air Force.
- Squadron Leader John Alexander Stappard (582505), Royal Air Force.
- Squadron Leader John Anthony West (5200665), Royal Air Force.
- Squadron Leader Robert Alfred Wright (4233042) Royal Air Force.
- Flight Lieutenant Peter William Howlett (4232608), Royal Air Force.

=== Air Force Medal (AFM) ===
- F4289935 Sergeant Tyronne Michael Stanley Barraclough, Royal Air Force.

=== Queen's Police Medal (QPM) ===
England and Wales

- Sir Kenneth Leslie Newman, Commandant, Police Staff College, Bramshill.
- Geoffrey James Dear, Assistant Commissioner, Metropolitan Police.
- Peter Simpson, Chief Superintendent, West Yorkshire Metropolitan Police.
- Derek Stoneley, Chief Superintendent, Derbyshire Constabulary.
- Eldred James Boothby, Chief Constable, Durham Constabulary.
- Francis Leo Jordan, Deputy Chief Constable, Kent Constabulary.
- Bruce Allan Wilson, Commander, Metropolitan Police.
- Anthony Simpson Tyler, Deputy Chief Constable, Nottinghamshire Constabulary.
- David Albert East, Chief Constable, Devon and Cornwall Constabulary.
- Thomas Ellis Thomas, Chief Superintendent, North Wales Police.
- Victor Thomas Lashbrook, Commander, Metropolitan Police.
- Alan Kemish, Chief Superintendent, Hampshire Constabulary.
- Francis William James Coombs, Chief Superintendent, Gloucestershire Constabulary.
- Michael Guy Webber, Chief Superintendent, Hertfordshire Constabulary.
- John Bagnall, Chief Superintendent, West Midlands Police.

Northern Ireland

- Harold Logan, Chief Inspector, Royal Ulster Constabulary.

Scotland

- Jean Moffat Cunningham, Superintendent, Lothian and Borders Police.
- Alistair James McWilliam Smith, Chief Superintendent, Grampian Police and Deputy Commandant, Scottish Police College.

Overseas Territories

- Harold Vincent Brown, M.V.O., C.P.M., Assistant Commissioner, Royal Hong Kong Police.

Australian States
Queensland

- William John McArthur, Superintendent, Queensland Police Force.

South Australia

- Elliott Stanley Marshall, Superintendent, South Australian Police Force

== Australia ==
=== Knight Bachelor ===
- Laurence (Charles) Brodie-Hall, C.M.G. For service to the mining industry.
- (James) Keith Campbell, C.B.E. For service to commerce, industry and the community
- Neil (Smith) Currie, C.B.E. For public service.
- The Honourable Mr. Justice (Joseph Patrick) George Kneipp. For service to education and the community.
- Eric (James) Neal. For service to industry.
- The Honourable Mr Justice (Albert) Edward Woodward, O.B.E. For public service.
- Donald (Dean) von Bibra C.M.G., O.B.E. For service to primary industry and the community.

=== Order of the Bath ===
==== Companion of the Order of the Bath (CB) ====
Civil Division

- Roy James Cameron. For public service.

=== Order of Saint Michael and Saint George ===
==== Knight Commander of the Order of St Michael and St George (KCMG) ====
- The Honourable Denis James Killen, MP. For parliamentary service.

==== Companion of the Order of St Michael and St George (CMG) ====
- Keith Hedley Cousins. For service to the advertising industry and the community.
- Professor Derek John Mulvaney. For service to education.
- Dr Bernard McCarthy O'Brien. For service to medicine, particularly in the field of microsurgery.
- Brian John Sweeney. For service to the arts.
- Frank Lionel Watts, M.B.E. For service to the disabled.

=== Order of the British Empire ===
==== Dame Commander of the Order of the British Empire (DBE) ====
Civil Division

- The Hon Justice Roma Flinders Mitchell, C.B.E. For service to the community.

==== Commander of the Order of the British Empire (CBE) ====
Military Division

Australian Army

- Major General The Honorable Jack Lawrence Kelly. For service to the Australian Army as Judge Advocate General.

Royal Australian Air Force

- Air Vice-Marshal Ernest Michael Carroll. For service to the Royal Australian Air Force as Chief of Supply in the Department of Defence.
- Principal Air Chaplain Geoffrey John Crossman. For service to the Royal Australian Air Force as Principal Air Chaplain.

General Division

- John Gatenby Bolton. For public service, particularly in the field of radio astronomy.
- Roy Daniel, O.B.E. For public service.
- Edward Frank Downing, Q.C. For service to law.
- Dr Reuben Hertzberg. For service to medicine, particularly in the field of ophthalmology.
- James Joseph Kennedy. For service to the community.
- Dr Stanley William Williams. For service to medicine, particularly in the field of paediatrics.

==== Officer of the Order of the British Empire (OBE) ====
- Professor Joyce Irene Ackroyd (Mrs Speed). For service to education.
- Freddy Argy. For public service.
- Valda Rose Aveling. For service to music.
- Dr Joseph Thomas Baker. For service to marine science.
- Guilford March Bell. For service to the arts and the National Trust.
- Alan Frederick Bromwich, O.St.J. For public service in the field of health.
- Matthew John Carroll. For service to the film industry.
- Leonard Paul Evans. For service to the wine industry and to the community.
- Max Melech Freilich. For service to the Jewish community.
- Ashley William Goldsworthy. For service to computing.
- James Cairns Harrison, D.F.C. For service to the dried fruit industry and to the community.
- William John Henderson. For service to industry and exports.
- The Honourable Robert Shannon King. For parliamentary service, service to the community and to primary industry.
- Reverend Canon Stanley Wynton Kurrle. For service to education and to religion.
- Wellington Lee. For service to the community, particularly the Chinese community.
- Florence Violet Lloyd. For service to women and to the community.
- Althaea McTaggart. For service to the community.
- The Reverend Brian Jack Moxon. For service to the community.
- James Thomas O'Connnor. For public service.
- Edmund Archdale Palmer. For service to science and technology.
- Alderman Barbara Tweed Payne. For service to the community.
- Leonard Anzac Reason. For service to the advertising industry.
- Hugh Joseph Ryan. For public service.
- Dr Gordon Keys Smith. For service to the disabled.
- Carlo Stransky. For service to the Italian community.
- Thomas William Walker. For service to veterans.
- Dr Kathleen Helen Walsh. For service to medicine, particularly in the field of paediatrics.
- Woodrow Weight. For service to the real estate industry and to the community.

==== Member of the Order of British Empire (MBE) ====
- Alderman John Anderson. For service to the community.
- Victor Howard Bergstrom. For service to the sport of cycling.
- Geoffrey James Betts. For service to commerce, to the community and to the welfare of members of the Defence Force.
- Brian Charles Booth. For service to youth, to the community and to sport.
- Leo William Bradshaw. For service to the community, particularly children's welfare.
- Edna Francis Brooker. For service to health and to Aboriginal welfare.
- The Reverend John Graeme Bucknall. For service to religion.
- Alexander George Burgoyne. For public service.
- Brian Erskine Chaseling. For service to the community.
- Walter Johannes Augustinus de Veer. For service to the ethnic community.
- William Frederick Ewan Duncan. For service to the community.
- Matron Phyllis Tamar Eaton. For service to disabled children.
- Agnes Meek Farrance. For service to education.
- The Reverend Herbert Edmund Fawell. For service to religion.
- Captain Maxwell Lakin Fortheringham, E.D., (R.L.). For service to veterans and to the community.
- James Alexander Gibson. For service to the community.
- Betty Green. For service to nursing.
- Frederick Ernest Hodgkinson. For service to brass band music and to the marching girls movement.
- Norman Thomas Henry Jeffries. For service to the community.
- John Mitchell Kirtley. For public service.
- John Lapaine. For service to migrants, particularly the Italian community.
- Doreen Lawton. For service to Aboriginal welfare.
- The Reverend Canon Kenneth Lawrence Loane. For service to religion and to the community.
- Terence John Norman Long. For public service.
- Joseph Henry Lord. For service to the sport of rugby football.
- Brian Alfonso Lorenz. For public service.
- James Francis McAuliffe. For service to primary industry.
- John Samuel McCann. For service to sport in the fields of Australian rules football and lawn bowls.
- Francis McCarthy. For service to the community.
- Donald McCorquodale. For service to the aircraft industry.
- Councillor Francis William McKay. For service to local government.
- John Warren McPhee. For public service.
- William George Moody, M.C., E.D. For public service.
- The Reverend Russell Henry Oldmeadow. For service to the community.
- Nicholas Paspaley. For service to the pearling industry.
- Wilfred Edward Pennefather. For service to primary industry.
- Efstathios Raftopoulos. For service to migrants, particularly the Greek community.
- Basil William Rait. For service to the community and to historical research.
- Thomas John Smith. For service to the community.
- Joseph Spence Spinaze. For service to the community.
- The Reverend Basil Albin Valentine. For service to migranrs.
- Phyllis Dorothy Vimpani. For service women's affairs and to the community.
- Francis Joseph Whitty. For public service.
- Elese Jean Wood. For service to the community.
- Carlo Vittorio Zaccariotto. For service to migrants, particularly the Italian community.

==== British Empire Medal (BEM) ====
- Edwin Doige (Ted) Baskerville. For service to the community.
- Thomas Ronald Blomeley. For public service.
- Councillor Stanley George Bonighton. For service to the community.
- Charles Bristow Burrows. For service to photography.
- George William Byers. For public service.
- Jeannie Catherine Cecil. For service to the community.
- Alexander (Mick) Clarke. For service to sport and to the community.
- Ella May Compton. For service to the community.
- Frederick Matthew Eccleston. For service to veterans.
- Nancy Margaret Ford. For service to the community.
- Ethlyn Constance Freshney. For service to youth.
- Lyall Thomas Freshney. For service to youth.
- Jack Galloway. For public service.
- James William Goad, D.S.M. For public service.
- David George Graham. For public service.
- Brian Donald Griffiths. For public service.
- Elizabeth Annie Hepburn. For service to the Girl Guides.
- David Ernest Jefferys. For service to local government.
- Margery Hazel Joule. For service to the disabled and to the community.
- Edgar John Knight. For public service.
- Fig Knutson. For service to the community.
- Maurice Sydney Hutchinson Lackey. For service to the sport of amateur sailing and to youth.
- Doreen Margaret Letcher. For public service.
- Helen Liddy. For service to the community.
- Valmai Mary Lucas. For service to the community.
- Colin McGregor. For public service.
- George McKay. For service to the community.
- Lola Mary Miller. For service to the community.
- Arthur Thomas Mills. For public service.
- Doris Nobel Officer. For service to the community.
- William John (Bill) Peel. For public service.
- Walter Thomas Randle. For public service.
- Doris Gwenda Rhodes. For service to health.
- Catherime Lilian Rice. For service to the community.
- Vivian Dennis Roger. For public service.
- Ivy Winifred Rogers. For service to the community.
- Percival Leonard Rogers. For service to the community.
- John Victor (Jack) Rosander. For public service.
- Wojciech (Albert) Smialek. For public service.
- Beryl Mary Smith. For service to sport.
- Dudley Eric Smith. For public service.
- Katherine Anne Stephen. For service to the community.
- Dora May Townsend. For service to the community.
- Gerald Thomas Walden. For service to the community and to the disabled.
- Frank Burton Westbrook. For service to the community.

==== Companion of the Imperial Service Order (ISO) ====
- Hugh Gibson Badger. For public service.

==== Queen's Police Medal (QPM) ====
- Detective Inspector George Davidson. For public service.

==== Queen's Fire Service Medal (QFSM) ====
- Chief Fire Officer Peter Dawson Holtham. For public service.

== Barbados ==
=== Knight Bachelor ===
- Professor Kenneth Livingstone Standard, C D., Head of the Department of Social and Preventive Medicine, University of the West Indies.

== Fiji ==
=== Order of Saint Michael and Saint George ===
==== Companion (CMG) ====
- Josevata Kamikamica. For public and community service.

=== Order of the British Empire ===
==== Commander (CBE) ====
Civil division

- Adrian Rood Tarte. For service to the copra industry and the community.

Military division

- Brigadier Robert Ian Thorpe – Commander, Royal Fiji Military Forces.

==== Officer (OBE) ====
Civil division

- Dr Alan Harry Penington – Tuberculosis Control Officer Central.
- Uday Singh JP. For community service.
- Adi Litia Tavanavanua. For services to women.

Military division

- Lieutenant Colonel Edward Kikau Tuivanuavou – 1st Battalion, Fiji Infantry Regiment.

==== Member (MBE) ====
Civil division

- Parmanand Paul Jaduram – mayor of Labasa.
- Lai Mohammed. For service to the community.
- Ratu Tevita Dikedike Qioniwasa. For service to the community.
- Inoke Vakataraisulu Tabualevu – Director of Youth and Sport.

Military division

- Warrant Officer Class II Nacani Korovulavula – Royal Fiji Military Forces.
- Warrant Officer Class II Serupepeli Tagivakatini – Royal Fiji Military Forces.

=== British Empire Medal (BEM) ===
Civil division

- Alipate Bale Davelevu – supervisor in charge, Rural Water Supplies, Public Works Department.
- Jainul Haq – senior technical officer, Public Works Department.

Military division

- Staff Sergeant Ilisoni Raileqe – 3rd Battalion, Fiji Infantry Regiment (Territorial Force).

== Mauritius ==
=== Knight Bachelor ===
- Cassam Ismael Moollan, Q.C., Chief Justice.

=== Order of the British Empire ===
==== Commander (CBE) ====
Civil division

- Ahmed Abdulla Ahmed, For services to commerce and industry.
- Joseph Claude Alain Noel. For service to agronomy and agricultural diversification.

==== Officer (OBE) ====
Civil division

- Arthur Philippe Rault, lately Commissioner of Lands, Ministry of Housing, Lands, and Town and Country Planning.

==== Member (MBE) ====
Civil division

- Kissoon Lall Dookhit. For voluntary social work.
- Dharam-Vir Ghura. For voluntary social work.
- Cassam Mamode Ibrahim. For service to the bus transport industry.
- Lallman Jugessur. For voluntary social work.

=== Imperial Service Order (ISO) ===
- Aloys Joseph Ah Kong, lately Director of Statistics.

=== Mauritius Police Medal ===
- Marie Joseph Guy Groeme, Superintendent, Mauritius Police Force.
- Sahdasseeven Madoorappen, Assistant Superintendent, Mauritius Police Force.
- Jean Cyril Sibaly, B.E.M., Superintendent, Mauritius Police Force.

== Papua New Guinea ==
=== Knight Bachelor ===
- The Honourable Mr. Justice William John Francis Kearney, C.B.E., lately Deputy Chief Justice, Supreme Court
- The Reverend Ravu Henao, O.B.E. For services to religion.

=== Order of Saint Michael and Saint George ===
==== Companion (CMG) ====
- Frederick Bernard Carl Reiher. For public service.
- Harold Victor Quinton, O.B.E. For services to the cocoa and copra industries.

=== Order of the British Empire ===
==== Dame Commander (DBE) ====
- Civil division
- Miss Alice Wedega, M.B.E. Far services to the community.

==== Commander (CBE) ====
- Civil division
- The Honourable Wasangula Noel Levi, M.P. For services to politics and government.
- Paul Joseph Quinlivan. For services to the law.

==== Officer (OBE) ====
Military division

- Colonel Robert Medode Dademo (882213), Papua New Guinea Defence Force.

Civil division

- Gabriel Salu Buanam. For public service.
- Dr Burton Gyrth Burton-Bradley. For services to mental health.
- Arthur Edward Charles, Chief Agronomist.
- The Reverend Father Cherubim Dambui. For services to provincial government.
- Thomas Edova Fox, Managing Director, Investment Corporation of Papua New Guinea.
- The Honourable Akepa Miakwe, M.P. For services to politics and the community.
- Alan Eugene Hynes Ross. For services to forestry.

==== Member (MBE) ====
Civil division

- Peni Bori. For services to the community.
- Sop Bubun. For services to the community.
- Nakau Iki. For services to the Community.
- Jean-Pierre Longayroux. For services to the oil palm industry.
- Undi Nando. For services to local and provincial government.
- Miss Philomena Cecilia Paru. For public service.
- Blasius Raring. For services to the community.
- MjsslrHenao Rarua. Private Secretary to the Prime Minister.
- John Sianor. For services to the community.
- Kuluwah Silwau. For services to local and provincial government.
- Liba Wadilei. For service to local government.
- Balip Yupal. For services to the community.

==== British Empire Medal (BEM) ====
- Civil division
- Duea Arinte. For services to local government.
- Samuel Ganauli. For public service as a driver.
- Pokoraja Mima. For services to the community.
- Andrew Ivarami Suang. For services to the Papua New Guinea Fire Service.
- Joseph Toro. For public service in the field of education
- Kurarima, Mrs. Ukuma. For services to the community.

=== Imperial Service Order (ISO) ===
- Mea Vai, Assistant Secretary (Administration and Overseas), Department of Foreign Affairs and Trade.

=== Queen's Police Medal (QPM) ===
- Jim Airu Napkai, Chief Superintendent, Royal Papua New Guinea Constabulary.

== Solomon Islands ==
=== Order of the British Empire ===
==== Officer (OBE) ====
Civil division

- Dr. John Kere. For services to medicine.
- How Yuan Kwan. For services to commerce, industry and shipbuilding.

==== Member (MBE) ====
Civil division

- Bernard Samuel Ward. For public service.
- John Wheatley. For services to sport.

==== British Empire Medal (BEM) ====
Civil division

- Edward Bakale. For services to sport.
- Kaimanisi Hilasikai. For services to health safety.
- Reginald Kirinwai. For services to commerce.
- Hugh Ouou. For services to the community.
- Valentine Wale. For services to sport.

== Tuvalu ==
=== Order of the British Empire ===
==== Member (MBE) ====
Civil division

- Frank Hoy, Manager Tuvalu Philatelic Bureau.

==== British Empire Medal (BEM) ====
Civil division

- Metusela Neia. Member of Public Service Commission.

== St Vincent & Grenadines ==
=== Order of the British Empire ===
==== Officer (OBE) ====
Civil division

- Clarence Lloyd Keizer. For services to the com- munity.
- Frank Odel Mason, I.S.O. For services to sport and the community.

==== Member (MBE) ====
Civil division

- Thomas Augustus Browne. For services to the community.
- Carlton Jerome Williams. Chief Agricultural Officer.

== Antigua & Barbuda ==
=== Order of the British Empire ===
==== Officer (OBE) ====
Civil division

- George Hubert Nathaniel Henry. For services to education and to the community.

==== Member (MBE) ====
Civil division

- Hugh Romel Montgomery Bailey. For services to seamanship and to shipping.
- Charles Gordon Sampson. For services to education.
