= Laidlaw (surname) =

Laidlaw is a Scottish surname. Notable people with the surname include:

- Alex Laidlaw (1877–1933), Scottish rugby player
- Anna Robena Laidlaw (1819–1901), British pianist
- Bill Laidlaw (1914–1941), Scottish professional golfer
- Sir Christophor Laidlaw (1922–2010), British businessman
- Chris Laidlaw (born 1943), New Zealand rugby union player, public servant, diplomat, radio host and politician
- Clyde Laidlaw (1933–2024), Australian rules footballer
- Daniel Laidlaw (1875–1950), Scottish piper, recipient of the Victoria Cross
- Diana Laidlaw (born 1951), South Australian politician
- Don Laidlaw (1923–2009), South Australian politician, father of Diana
- Ethan Laidlaw (1899–1963), American actor
- Ethan Laidlaw (footballer) (born 2005), Scottish footballer
- Frank Fortescue Laidlaw (1876–1963), British biologist
- Frank Laidlaw (1940–2025), Scottish rugby union player
- George Laidlaw (1828–1889), British-Canadian businessman
- Greig Laidlaw (born 1985), Scottish rugby union player
- Harriet Burton Laidlaw (1873–1949), American social reformer and suffragist
- Irvine Laidlaw, Baron Laidlaw (born 1942), Scottish businessman
- James Laidlaw (1822–1905), multiple people
- Joe Laidlaw (1950–2021), English footballer
- John Laidlaw (disambiguation)
- Lorna Laidlaw (born 1963), English actress and television presenter
- Kevin Laidlaw (1934–2024), New Zealand rugby union player
- Marc Laidlaw (born 1960), American writer
- Matthew Laidlaw (born 1987), Australian rules footballer
- Patrick Laidlaw (1881–1940), Scottish virologist
- Paul Laidlaw (born 1967), Scottish auctioneer and television personality
- Sir Robert Laidlaw (MP) (1856–1915), British philanthropist, entrepreneur and politician
- Robert Laidlaw (1885–1971), New Zealand businessman
- Ross Laidlaw (author), Scottish writer, active since 1979
- Ross Laidlaw (born 1992), Scottish football goalkeeper
- Roy Laidlaw (born 1953), Scottish rugby union player
- Scott Laidlaw (1953–2026), American football player
- Stuart Laidlaw (1877–1960), Canadian lacrosse player
- Thomas Laidlaw (politician) (1813–1876), Scottish-born Australian politician
- Thomas Kennedy Laidlaw (1864–1943), Irish racehorse owner
- Tom Laidlaw (born 1958), Canadian ice hockey player
- William Laidlaw (poet) (1780–1845), Scottish poet
- William G. Laidlaw (1840–1908), U.S. Representative from New York
