= Laidlaw (disambiguation) =

Laidlaw is a defunct bus transportation contractor.

Laidlaw may also refer to:

- Laidlaw (novel), a novel by William McIlvanney
- Laidlaw, British Columbia
- Laidlaw College, New Zealand
- Laidlaw (surname)
- Laidlaw, an educational publisher later acquired by McGraw-Hill
