= Daniel Pearce =

Daniel Pearce may refer to:

- Daniel Pearce (chartered surveyor) (born 1933), British businessman
- Daniel Pearce (singer) (born 1978), English singer-songwriter
- Daniel Pearce, better known as Eats Everything (born 1980), English DJ and record producer
- Daniel Pearce (footballer) (born 1993), Australian rules footballer
