= Withall =

Withall is a surname. Notable people with the surname include:

- Billy Withall (1928–2020), British army officer
- Laetitia Withall (1881–1963), British poet, author and militant suffragette
- Latham Withall (1853–1925), British architect
