= Ian McGregor (malariologist) =

Professor Sir Ian McGregor CBE FRS FRCP FRSE
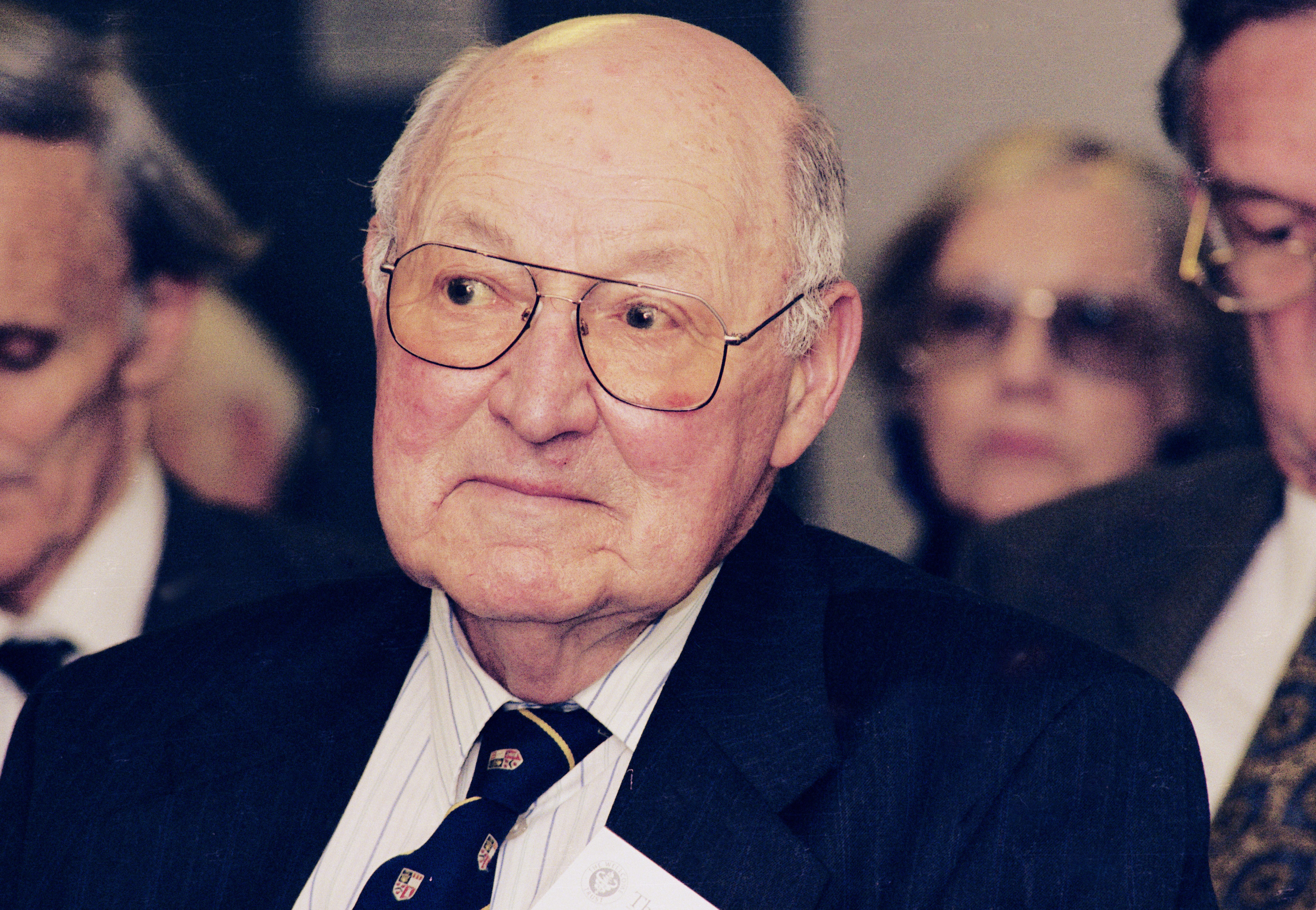
- Professor McGregor in 1999. Source: History of Modern Biomedicine Research Group
- Born: Ian Alexander McGregor; 26 August 1922; Cambuslang, Lanarkshire, Scotland
- Died: 1 February 2007 (aged 84); Homington, Wiltshire, England
- Education: Rutherglen Academy
- Alma mater: St Mungo's College; Glasgow Royal Infirmary
- Employers: Medical Research Council; Liverpool School of Tropical Medicine

Sir Ian Alexander McGregor (26 August 1922 – 1 February 2007) was a Scottish malariologist.

McGregor was born in Cambuslang, Lanarkshire, Scotland. His father was a tailor, his mother a housewife.

He was educated at Rutherglen Academy, then studied medicine at St Mungo's College and Glasgow Royal Infirmary.

He became interested in and studied malaria while undertaking National Service with the Royal Army Medical Corps in Palestine, undergoing training in malariology at the Middle East School of Hygiene at Dimra.

In 1949, he was sent to The Gambia as a member of the Medical Research Council's Human Nutrition Research Unit, and was appointed Director of the MRC's Gambian Field Station at Fajara in 1954.

In 1980, he returned to the United Kingdom, as visiting professor at the Liverpool School of Tropical Medicine.

He was awarded the Darling Foundation Medal in 1974, elected a Fellow of the Royal Society in 1981 and a Fellow of the Royal Society of Edinburgh, and was made an Officer of the Order of the British Empire (OBE) in the 1959 New Year Honours; a Commander of the Order of the British Empire (CBE) in the 1968 Birthday Honours; and a Knight Bachelor in the 1982 Birthday Honours, "for services to Tropical Medicine".

He served on several World Health Organization committees on malaria.

He died at Homington, Wiltshire in 2007.

== Notable works ==
- Wernsdorfer, Walther H.; McGregor, Ian A. (1989). Malaria: Principles and Practice of Malariology. Churchill Livingstone. ISBN 978-0443024177.
