= David Morrell (doctor) =

British academic general practitioner

David Cameron Morrell FRCGP OBE (6 November 1929–19 March 2012) was a medical doctor, primary care pioneer and former president of the British Medical Association (BMA). He was the first academic general practitioner to become president of the BMA.

== Early life ==
Morrell was born on 6 November 1929 in Wimbledon, London, England. He studied at St Mary's Hospital Medical School and qualified in 1953.

== Medical career ==
Morrell worked for five years in health service practice in Hoddesdon, Hertfordshire. In 1962 he moved to the university department of general practice in Edinburgh in West Richmond Street. In 1967 he moved to St Thomas's Hospital Medical School and was appointed Wolfson Professor of General Practice in 1974. He authored a book, the Art of General Practice, published in 1991.

He retired from clinical practice in 1993 and was elected as BMA president in 1994.

== Awards and honours ==
Morrell was made an Officer of the Order of the British Empire (OBE) in the 1982 Birthday Honours. He received a Papal Knighthood the same year.

He died on 19 March 2012.
