= Raymond Pennock, Baron Pennock =

Raymond William Pennock, Baron Pennock (16 June 1920 – 23 February 1993) was a British industrialist who served as the President of the Confederation of British Industry between 1980 and 1982.

Pennock was educated at Coatham School and Merton College, Oxford, of which he became an honorary Fellow in 1979. He served in the Royal Artillery between 1941 and 1946, reaching the rank of captain, and was mentioned in despatches.

Pennock was made a knight bachelor in 1978, and was created a life peer, as Baron Pennock, of Norton in the County of Cleveland in the 1982 Birthday Honours.
