= Narindar Saroop =

Indian-born British businessman (1929–2020)

Major Narindar Saroop CBE (14 August 1929 – 19 December 2020) was an Indian-born British businessman. He was the eldest son of Chaudhri Ram Saroop, Ismaila, Rohtak, India and the late Shyam Devi. He was educated at the Aitchison College for Punjab Chiefs in Lahore and the Indian Military Academy, Dehra Dun.

In 1952 he first married Ravi Gill, the only surviving child of the Sardar and Sardarni of Premgarh, India. This marriage was dissolved by divorce in 1967. By this marriage he had two daughters and one son (deceased).

His second marriage took place in 1969 to Stephanie Denise, the youngest daughter of Alexander and Cynthia Amie Cronopulo of Zakynthos, Greece.

Narindar Saroop served as a regular officer of the British Indian Army, the 2nd Royal Lancers (Gardner's Horse) and Queen Victoria's Own The Poona Horse retiring at the rank of Major in 1952.

Upon leaving the Army Major Saroop became a management trainee at Yule Catto in 1954. He became a senior executive and director of subsidiaries of various multinationals until 1976. Later directorships and advisory positions were with Oxfam Relief Project (1964), Devi Grays Insurance Ltd (1981–84), Capital Plant International Ltd (1982–86), Develt, Clarkson Puckle Group (1976–87), Banque Belge (1987–91), Cancer Relief Macmillan Fund (1992–95), National Grid plc (1993), Coutts & Co. (1995–98) and the BBC Advisory Council on Asian Programmes (1977–81).

He was appointed a Commander of the Order of the British Empire in the 1982 Birthday Honours.

Within British politics, Major Saroop contested the Parliamentary seat for Greenwich as a Conservative candidate in the 1979 general election. He became the first Asian Tory Parliamentary candidate. He became the founder and first chairman of the UK Anglo Asian Conservative Society (1976–79; 1985–86) and vice-chairman of the Conservative Party International Office (1990–92). He was a Councillor for the Royal Borough of Kensington and Chelsea (1974–82) and initiated the Borough Community Relations Committee (1975–77; 1980–82). He was also Chairman of the Working Party on Employment (1978).

Other memberships included: The Institute of Directors, Founding member of the Tory Asians for Representation Group, the Victoria and Albert Museum Appeal Committee.

Major Saroop founded and was the Chairman of the Durbar Club (since 1981). He was a member of the Beefsteak Club, the Cavalry and Guards Club, Pratt's, the Imperial Delhi Gymkhana Club, the Royal Bombay Yacht Club and the Royal Calcutta Golf Club.

He died on 19 December 2020 at the age of 91.
