= Angela Gould =

British nurse and manager

- Born: 1922; Portsmouth
- Died: 20 December 2016 (aged 93–94); Horndean
- Occupation: nurse educator
- Organization: Royal College of Nursing
- Known for: improving management and training systems for qualified nurses
- Honours: OBE FRCN

Angela Gould (1922 – 2016) OBE FRCN was a nurse educator and manager with a special interest in improving management and training systems for qualified nurses.

== Background and training ==
Angela Gould was born in Portsmouth, Hampshire England. She trained as a nurse at Lewisham and Hackney Hospitals between 1940 and 1943 obtaining State Registration in 1943. She obtained a Sister Tutor's Diploma in 1951. Gould spent time in the United States of America and obtained a Certificate of Ophthalmology and Otorhinolaryngology from Massachusetts Eye and Ear Hospital, Boston, USA.

== Further career ==
In 1962 Gould was appointed Principal Tutor at St. Luke's Hospital, Bradford, having previously held posts of ward sister and tutor at Lewisham hospital also tutorial posts at Southampton Hospital School of Nursing and the Royal Masonic Hospital W6. In 1963 Gould was appointed Assistant Regional Nursing Officer to the Wessex Regional Hospital Board. In this role she led innovative work in management courses for nurses. She initiated a partnership between health authorities in Wessex and local management courses for middle managers, providing the first regional course of its kind: her post subsequently became Regional Nurse, Personnel and Training. In 1971 Gould became a Member of the Institute of Personnel Management, after which she looked into improving information systems for nurse managers.

Gould set up a system for the recruitment and employment of newly qualified nurses which was widely used in Wessex and other health regions. Gould also created a steering group for the development of computerised information and control systems for nursing practice. From 1975 Gould was a member of the National Staff Committee for Nurses and Midwives, making a significant contribution to their reports on nurse management training.

By 1982 Gould was the co-ordinator for Wessex Health Region of new programmes for the Diploma of Nursing. She made a significant nursing contribution to Wessex Regional Health Authority reports and publications during her time with them. The National Training Council creation of the Masters Bursary Scheme was in response to Gould's recommendations. Gould was director to two experimental manpower planning seminars in 1982.

Gould was a keen contributor to the Royal College of Nursing (RCN) History of Nursing Society (now History of Nursing Forum). In 1990 she wrote to the Nursing Standard promoting a forthcoming event on 11th September 1990 in which nurses who took part in the Battle of Britain either as nurses or civilians could relate their experiences.

== Publication ==
Review of training developments in the care of the elderly: proposals for a training strategy: report to the National Health Service Training Authority, London National Health Service Training Authority 1984).

== Honours and awards ==
- 1982 Gould was awarded the OBE (Order of the British Empire) in the Queen's Birthday Honours.
- 1982 Gould was awarded Fellowship of the Royal College of Nursing, FRCN.

== Demise ==
Angela Gould died in Horndean, Hampshire, on 20 December 2016 aged 94 years. A memorial service took place on 6th January 2017 in All Saints Church, Denmead, Hampshire.
