= Gordon Robson =

Scottish anaethetist

Sir James Gordon Robson (18 March 1921 – 23 February 2007) was a Scottish anaesthetist.

He was born in Stirling, Scotland and educated at the high school in Stirling and at Glasgow University, where he graduated MB ChB in 1944, towards the end of the Second World War. After working in obstetrics for a few months he joined the Royal Army Medical Corps and was posted to East Africa, where he began a career in anaesthetics.

After the war he returned to Glasgow for four years as a Senior Registrar in anaesthetics. After a further two years in Newcastle he moved back to Scotland in 1954 as consultant anaesthetist at the Edinburgh Royal Infirmary. In 1956 he moved, this time to McGill University, Montreal as Wellcome research Professor of Anaesthetics, where he carried out research on halothane and the neurophysiology of anaesthetic drugs. In 1964, a final move took him to the Royal Postgraduate Medical School, Hammersmith, London as Professor of Anaesthetics, where he stayed until his retirement in 1986.

He was knighted in the 1982 Birthday Honours and president of the Royal Society of Medicine from 1986 to 1988.

He died in 2007. He had married twice; firstly Martha Graham Kennedy, by whom he had one son and secondly Jenny Kilpatrick.
