= Trevor Hughes =

British engineer and civil servant (1925-2017)

Sir Trevor Poulton Hughes, KCB (28 September 1925 – 8 September 2017) was a British engineer and civil servant.

Born on 28 September 1925, he was in the Royal Engineers from 1945 to 1948 and then worked in engineering. In 1961, he entered HM Civil Service, working in the Ministry of Transport and, from 1962 in the Ministry of Housing and Local Government and its successor the Department of the Environment. He was successively the Department's Deputy Chief Engineer from 1970 to 1971, Director of Water Engineering from then to 1972 and the Director-General of Water Engineering from 1972 to 1974. He was promoted to Deputy Secretary in 1974, moving in 1977 to the Ministry of Transport. From 1980 to 1985, he was Permanent Secretary of the Welsh Office. For his service, he was appointed a Companion of the Order of the Bath (CB) in the 1974 Birthday Honours and was promoted to Knight Commander in the 1982 Birthday Honours. After leaving the civil service, he sat on the British Waterways Board and chaired several limited companies. He died on 8 September 2017. His brother was John Richard Poulton Hughes, DL (1920–2006), the county clerk and chief executive of Staffordshire County Council from 1978 to 1983.
