= Damian Hopley =

England international rugby union player

- Born: Damian Paul Hopley; 12 April 1970 (age 56) London, England, UK
- Height: 6 ft 2 in (1.88 m)
- Weight: 14 st 9 lb (93 kg)
- School: St Benedict's School, Ealing; Harrow School
- University: University of St Andrews, University of Cambridge

Rugby union career
- Position: Wing / Centre
Youth career
- 1990-1992: Wasps Academy
Senior career
Years	Team	Apps	(Points)
- St. Andrews
1992-1998	London Wasps	43	(95)
International career
Years	Team	Apps	(Points)
- England A
1995	England	3	(3)
National sevens team
Years	Team		Comps
1993	England		1

Damian Hopley MBE (born 12 April 1970) is a former rugby union player for London Wasps and England. His position of choice was on the wing or in the centres.

== Background ==
Born in South London, Hopley attended St Benedict's School in Ealing West London where he represented first his School, County, Region and Country in rugby and Harrow School. Known by all who know him as "Hoppers", he was nicknamed the "vicar of rugby" in the Press, having studied theology at the University of St Andrews and Cambridge University and holds a Master of Theology degree. proceeding to a post graduate degree in education at Cambridge University where he won a Blue.

== Career ==
Hopley continued playing rugby for his university side. He spent his entire playing career with London Wasps before retiring at only 26 due to injuries just months after the sport turned professional.

He was a member of the successful England sevens team that won the Melrose Cup in the inaugural IRB 1993 Rugby World Cup Sevens at Murrayfield. He won 3 caps for England and retired in 1998 after injuries forced him to retire at the age of 27.

== Other work ==
Hopley is the founder and chief executive of the not-for-profit registered trade union Rugby Players' Association (RPA), launched in August 1998, as the representative body and collective voice of professional rugby union players in England.

Hopley was appointed Member of the Order of the British Empire (MBE) in the 2021 New Year Honours for services to rugby union football.
