= Young Enterprise =

Educational charity

- Founded: 1962; 64 years ago
- Founder: Sir Walter Salomon
- Type: Charity
- Region served: United Kingdom
- Members: 482,000 participants annually
- CEO: Sarah Porretta
- Chair: Simon Lewis
- Volunteers: 6,000+ (2018)
- Website: www.young-enterprise.org.uk

Young Enterprise is a British charity that specialises in providing enterprise education and financial education to young people.

It provides employability, enterprise and financial education programmes, resources and teacher training.

Since 1962, Young Enterprise has worked with both the business and education sectors.

== History ==
=== Early history ===
Sir Walter Salomon founded Young Enterprise in the 1962–1963 academic year, based on the American Junior Achievement programme. By the 1973–1974 academic year, there were twenty-two area boards across the UK running Young Enterprise programmes. In 1977, the European Federation of Young Enterprise was formed, with the UK, France and Belgium amongst the founding members. This was then renamed in 2002 to "Junior Achievement / Young Enterprise Europe".

In the 1980s, the Company Competition began to take on the form it has today. Young Enterprise companies would submit reports to judges who selected the best from each region. The six regional winners were then invited to attend the National Finals in London, where they would deliver a presentation. Midland Bank (now HSBC) also took on the Chairmanship of Young Enterprise in 1988.

=== Decentralisation and the introduction of new programmes ===
During the 1990s, Young Enterprise became less centralised. On 26 August 1991, Young Enterprise Scotland became an independent charity operating under licence from the main UK organisation. Similarly, Young Enterprise Northern Ireland was formed in August 1997. Wales followed suit, with its own organisation in October 1999. Aside from decentralising its operation, Young Enterprise also introduced new programmes during the 1990s. Project Business was launched in 1995, an International Trading and Entrepreneurship Masterclass in 1997, and a Graduate Programme in 1998.

In the 2000s, Young Enterprise continued to launch new programmes and reorganise its regional structure. The Primary Programme, originally run in Northern Ireland, was introduced the rest of the UK in 2000. In 2002, the charity's structure was finalised, with 12 autonomous regional organisations throughout the country. 2003 saw the introduction of a further two programmes, Learn to Earn and Enterprise in Action. Young Enterprise's ninth programme, Personal Economics, then launched in 2005.

== Benefits for participants ==
Typically, students who have participated in Young Enterprise will have a better understanding of entrepreneurship and business than their peers. Research conducted by FreshMinds found that students who complete the Company Programme typically earn between £40,000 and £45,000 after they reach the age of 30. In contrast, their classmates who did not take part in the programme, earn £26,000 to £30,000. Nearly 60% of those who had been on the Company Programme said they had a "good understanding" of career options when they left school, while 46% of those who did not take part did. It was also found that Young Enterprise alumni are twice as likely to start up their own company than their peers.
