= Daniel Pearce (chartered surveyor) =

British businessman (born 1933)

Daniel Pearce CBE
- Born: Daniel Norton Idris Pearce; 28 November 1933 (age 92)
- Occupations: Businessman, executive, and chartered surveyor

Sir Daniel Norton Idris Pearce CBE (born 28 November 1933) is a British businessman, executive, and chartered surveyor. He began his career at Richard Ellis (Richard Ellis International Ltd) in 1959, and has been a partner since 1961. He served as Manager Partner from 1981-87. He has been Chairman, English Estates since 1989, and an adviser to the National Health Service's Manager Board (1985–90).

Pearce was on the Advisory Panel for Institutional Finance in New Towns from 1974–80, on the Property Services Agency Advisory Board from 1981–86, on the Foreign and Commonwealth Office's Advisory Panel on Diplomatic Estate since 1985. He has been a member (since 1980) of the General Council of the Royal Institution of Chartered Surveyors. Pearce was a director at Cognatum Estates Ltd. from December 2008 to May 2009.

Pearce was appointed a Commander of the Order of the British Empire (CBE) in the 1982 Birthday Honours.

== Affiliations/honours ==
- Hon Colonel, 135 Independent Topological Squadron Royal Engineers (V)
- Hon Doctor of Science (City University, London)
- Hon Fellow, Thames Polytechnic's College of Estate Management
- Hon Doctor of the University (University of Greenwich)
- Hon Doctor of the University (University of Surrey)
