= Peter Wright (police officer) =

Former South Yorkshire Police officer and chief constable

Peter Wright CBE (21 July 1929 – 17 September 2011) was the Chief Constable of the South Yorkshire Police force from 1983 to 1990. During that period members of the force he commanded clashed with striking miners during the UK miners' strike (1984–85) and were responsible for the Hillsborough football ground in Sheffield on 15 April 1989 when the Hillsborough disaster occurred, where 97 fans died.

== Biography ==
He was born in Stockport, Cheshire and attended Edgeley Roman Catholic School and Stockport Technical School. He then served as rating in the Royal Navy for two years before joining Manchester Police in 1954. By 1975 he had reached the rank of Chief Superintendent in the Greater Manchester Police. In 1979 he was appointed Deputy Chief Constable of Merseyside Police, serving in that role during the 1981 Toxteth riots in Liverpool.

He was president of the Association of Chief Police Officers (ACPO) and put his name to the still extant 'Wright Protocol' that Chief Constables should agree to any policy promoted by the ACPO unless they dissent in writing, detailing their objections. He also served on the Parole Review Committee from 1987 to 1989. From 1991 to 1994 he was an adviser to the Ministry of Defence Police.

== Hillsborough Independent Panel ==
An independent panel with access to previously unreleased papers related to the Hillsborough Disaster reported in September 2012 that Wright was instrumental in a conspiracy to ensure that the South Yorkshire Police Force was not blamed.

The Coroner's Inquest, which reported in April 2016, found that Wright was "instrumental in the effort to ensure the [South Yorkshire] force was not blamed for the tragedy", "amending" contemporary accounts that criticised the police, and attempting to ensure that "drunken ticketless individuals" were blamed, not the police. However the inquiry jury found 'nothing to suggest that the behaviour of fans, drunken or otherwise, contributed to the disaster.'

== Independent Office for Police Conduct ==
The Independent Office for Police Conduct report published in November 2025 found there had been "fundamental failures" and "concerted efforts" to blame Liverpool fans, including by Wright. The report noted that Wright would have faced a case over 10 alleged breaches of the Police Disciplinary Code regarding his actions in the aftermath of the disaster.

Wright was found to have been “insensitive” by investigators looking at allegations he attempted to promote a false narrative, and would have had a case to answer for seeking to deflect blame.

Police appointments
Preceded by Incomplete	Chief Constable of South Yorkshire Police; 1983 – 1990	Succeeded by Richard Wells
