= Anna Robena Laidlaw =

British pianist (1819–1901)

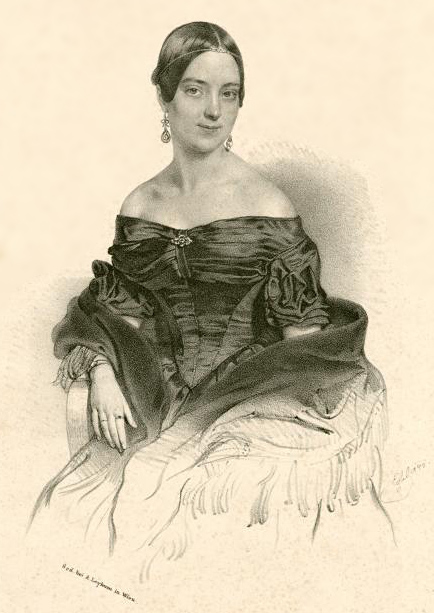
- engraving of the pianist
- Born: 30 April 1819; West Bretton
- Died: 29 May 1901 (aged 82); London
- Other names: Mrs Thomson
- Known for: Court pianist to Adelaide of Saxe-Meiningen

Anna Robena Laidlaw or Anna Robena Thomson (30 April 1819 – 29 May 1901) was a British pianist. She was court pianist to the queen of Hanover.

== Life ==
Robena Anna Keddy Laidlaw was born in West Bretton in Yorkshire in 1819. She was the daughter of Alexander Laidlaw who was a merchant of Scottish descent and his Irish wife Ann Keddy. Her father's family knew Sir Walter Scott and she was sent to Edinburgh to study the piano with Robert Müller. She continued her studies in Königsberg and later to London where she studied under Henri Herz.

In 1834 she played for William IV and the ageing Paganini before returning two years later to play in Warsaw, St Petersburg, Dresden, and Vienna and the following year in Leipzig. There she met Robert Schumann who created eight pieces for piano named Fantasiestücke, in her honour, the same year of 1837. It is not clear how close their relationship was, but Laidlaw is presumed to be the reason he started to compose again after a break of four months.

It was Schumann's idea to reverse her first two names so that it was Anna Robena Laidlaw who was appointed court pianist to the queen of Hanover in 1840. She toured Europe until 1845 when she returned to London where she lived with her parents until she married in 1852. Her new husband, George Thomson worked in insurance and together they had four daughters.

Laidlaw died in London in 1901.
