= Christophor Laidlaw =

Sir Christophor Charles Fraser Laidlaw (9 August 1922 – 27 November 2010) was a British businessman.

A forthright individual, and a fluent German speaker, he oversaw the expansion of BP oil distribution, and retail, across western Europe in the 1960s, and helped to make the company into a more commercial outfit.

== Early life ==
He was brought up in Cambridge attending Rugby School, then studied Modern Languages at St John's College, Cambridge.

== Career ==
He worked for a textile company in Manchester for two years.

He joined BP in 1948, going to Deutsche BP in 1959. He was a managing director within BP from 1972 to 1981.

He was Chairman of BP Oil International from January 1977, becoming Deputy Chairman of BP itself from 1980 to 1981. He was not chosen to become chairman, possibly due to his uncompromising manner.

He was Chairman of ICL from 1980 to March 1984; ICL had been formed in 1968.

== Personal life ==
He was knighted in the 1982 Birthday Honours. He married in 1952 in south-west Surrey. He was the father of Sam Laidlaw, the former chief executive of Centrica, and three daughters.

He died on 27 November 2010, aged 88.
