= John Laidlaw =

John Laidlaw may refer to:

- John Laidlaw (footballer) (born 1936), English footballer
- John Laidlaw (athlete) (fl. 1930s), Scottish runner
- John Coleman Laidlaw (1921–2015), Canadian endocrinologist
- John Baird Laidlaw (1866—1953), insurance executive and Toronto city councillor
