= Billy Withall =

Major-General William Withall
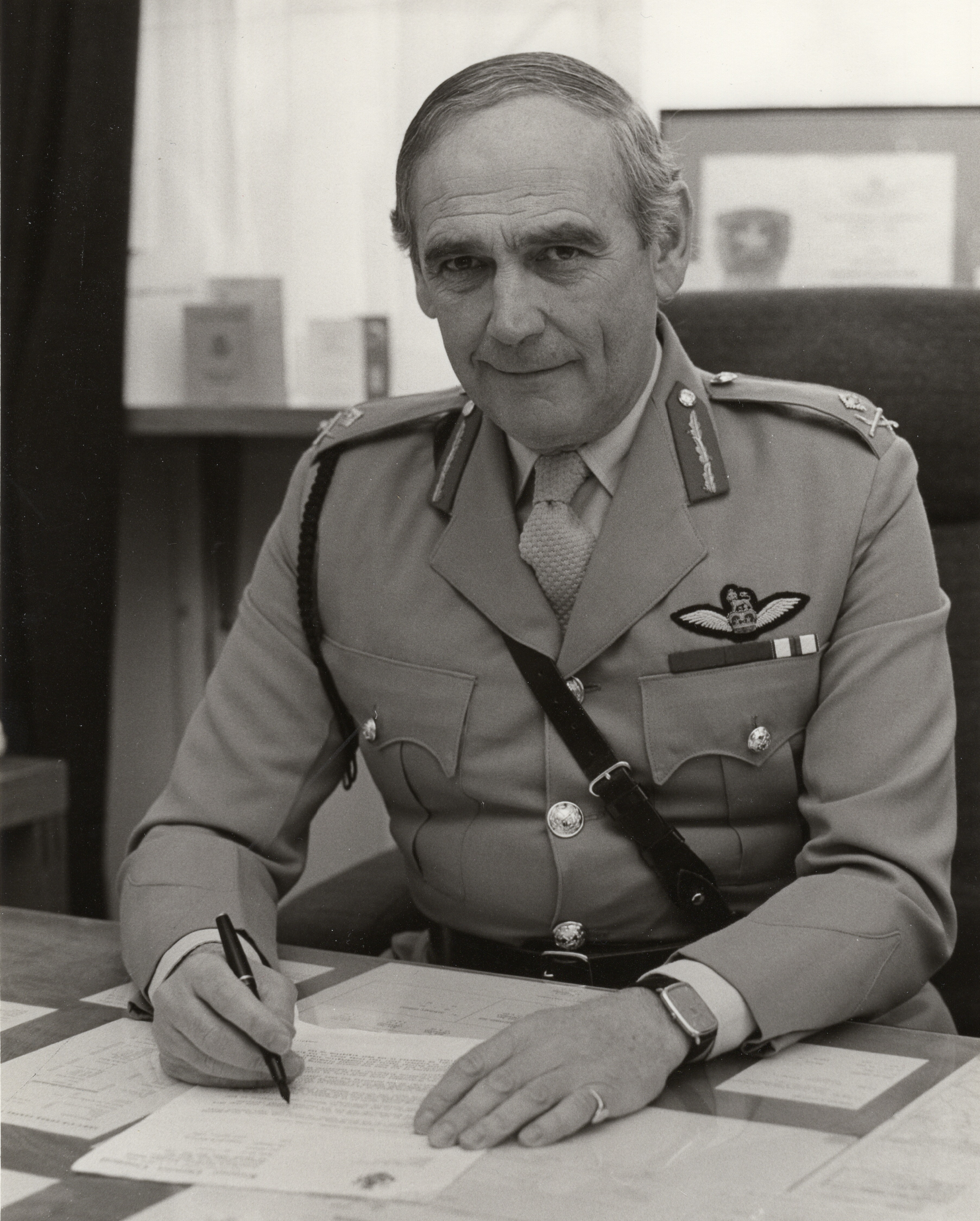
- Born: 14 October 1928
- Died: 21 February 2020 (aged 91)
- Military career
- Allegiance: United Kingdom
- Branch: British Army
- Service years: 1950–1997
- Rank: Major General
- Unit: Royal Engineers
- Commands: 26 Engineer Regiment; 11 Engineer Brigade
- Awards: CB

Major-General William Nigel James "Billy" Withall CB (14 October 1928 – 21 February 2020) joined the Army in 1950, and after completing his Officer Cadet training at Mons Officer Cadet School was commissioned in the Corps of Royal Engineers.

He was a graduate of the Staff College, Camberley (1961), the Joint Services Staff College, Latimer (1967), and the National Defence College of India (1977). He commanded a Field Squadron of Strategic Reserve and spent a year in Aden in 1965 building roads and airstrips in the foothills of the Radfan and he commanded a Regiment in BAOR in 1972. He then spent two and a half years as MA to the MGO and in 1974 he was Colonel, General Staff, at the Royal School of Military Engineering, being responsible worldwide for Combat Engineer tactics and training. He was also involved in the arrangements for bringing the Combat Engineer Tractor into service.

He commanded 26 Engineer Regiment in the early 1970s and went on to command 11 Engineer Brigade at Aldershot before going to India in 1977 to attend the National Defence College. He qualified as an Army pilot in January 1979 prior to assuming an appointment as Director Army Air Corps, a post he held until 1983. From 1984 to 1997 he was Colonel Commandant Royal Engineers.

In the 1982 Birthday Honours, Withall was made a Companion of the Order of the Bath (CB).

Withall was a keen games player. He played rugby and cricket at County level and also represented the Army at both sports, serving as Chairman of the Army Football Association from 1980 to 1981 and President of the Army Cricket Association from 1981 to 1983.

He was a supporter of Arsenal Football Club.

== Early life ==
Withall attended St Benedict's School, Ealing from 1940–1945.

== Memoir ==
Withall wrote a memoir in 2018 titled The Bengali Englishman - A Memoir of a Cold War Sapper.

== Other roles ==
- Honorary Life Vice Pres., Aircrew Assoc., 1986
- Chairman, RE Assoc., 1993–97
- Chairman., Chute Parish Council, 1995–2002
- Freeman, City of London, 1981
- Liveryman, Hon. Co. of Air Pilots (formerly GAPAN), 1981

== Clubs ==
- MCC
- I Zingari
- Band of Brothers
- Free Foresters Cricket Club
- Stragglers of Asia
