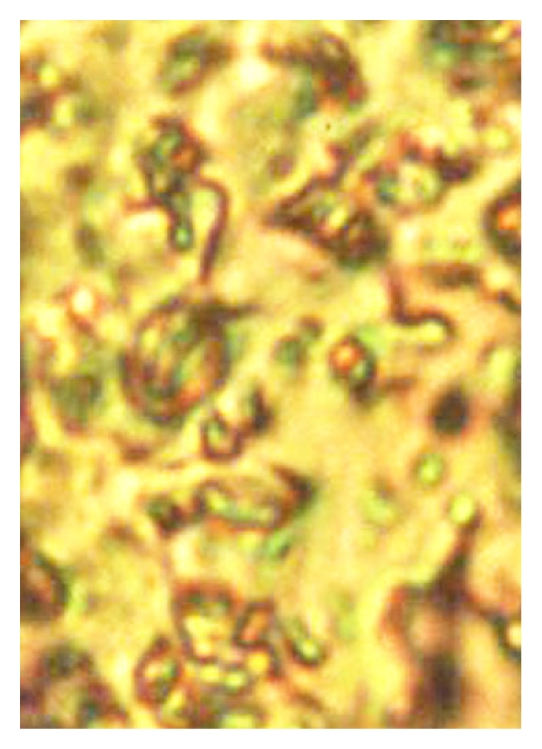
- T. antiquus in Triatoma dominicana fecal droplet

Scientific classification
- Domain: Eukaryota
- Supergroup: Discoba
- Phylum: Euglenozoa
- Class: Kinetoplastea
- Order: Trypanosomatida
- Family: Trypanosomatidae
- Genus: Trypanosoma
- Subgenus: Schizotrypanum
- Species: †T. antiquus

Binomial name
- †Trypanosoma antiquus Poinar, 2005

= Trypanosoma antiquus =

Trypanosoma antiquus Temporal range: Burdigalian

Extinct species in the kinetoplast class

Trypanosoma antiquus is an extinct species of kinetoplastid (class Kinetoplastida), a monophyletic group of unicellular parasitic flagellate protozoa.

The genus name is derived from the Greek trypano (borer) and soma (body) because of their corkscrew-like motion, and the species name from antiquua (old) reflecting the age of the specimen. All trypanosomes are heteroxenous (requiring more than one obligatory host in order to complete life cycle) or are transmitted through some variation of a vector.

The species was described in 2005 by George Poinar Jr. in the journal Vector-Borne & Zoonotic Diseases from metatrypanosomes preserved in several fecal pellets encased in Hymenaea protera amber. The fossil was recovered in the Dominican Republic from early Miocene Burdigalian stage deposits on the island of Hispaniola. Included with the pellets and thought to be the origin for them, is the extinct kissing bug Triatoma dominicana. This association is the oldest known example of the vector association between Triatoma and Trypanosoma. The holotype, deposited in the Oregon State University as specimen number P-3-3, was mined from the La Toca mine in the Dominican Republic. T. dominicana and T. antiquus lived in an environment similar to modern moist tropical rain forests. The preserved metatrypanosomes range in size from 11 to 20 μm with the average length being 15 μm. The species is placed in the Trypanosoma subgenus Schizotrypanum, and is identifiable by age and the average length being shorter than that of other Schizotrypanum species. Based on the contents of the amber specimen including three hematophagous insects, it is likely to have been formed in a tree cavity. Associated with the insects are several mammal hairs from an unidentified Chiropteran, the likely host for T. dominicana. The pellets are thought to have been deposited after the T. dominicana finished feeding on the host bat. Modern bat-hosted trypanosomes in the region are considered a vector for the fatal Chagas disease in humans.
