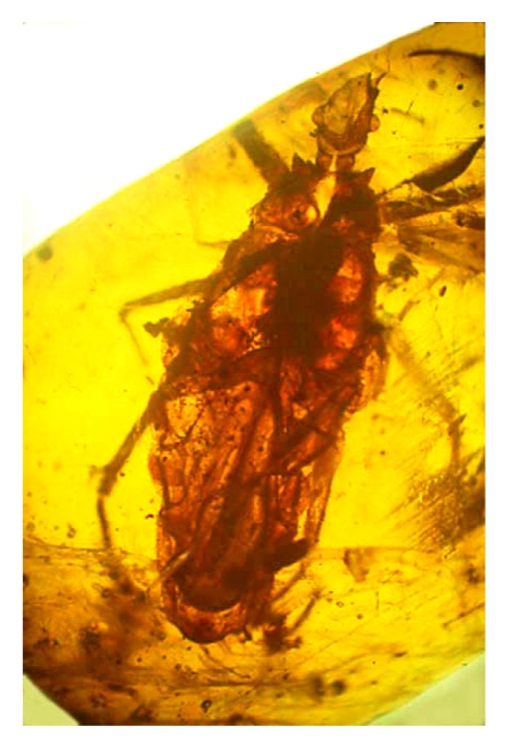
- Holotype

Scientific classification
- Kingdom: Animalia
- Phylum: Arthropoda
- Clade: Pancrustacea
- Class: Insecta
- Order: Hemiptera
- Suborder: Heteroptera
- Family: Reduviidae
- Genus: Triatoma
- Species: †T. dominicana

Binomial name
- †Triatoma dominicana Poinar, 2005

= Triatoma dominicana =

Triatoma dominicana Temporal range: Burdigalian

Extinct species of true bug

Triatoma dominicana is an extinct species of assassin bug in the subfamily Triatominae, the kissing bugs known from early Miocene Burdigalian stage Dominican amber deposits on the island of Hispaniola.

The species is known from a single 5th instar female nymph exuvia found in Hymenaea protera amber from deposits in the Dominican Republic. The holotype, deposited in the Oregon State University as specimen number He-4-73, was mined from the La Toca Dominican amber mine. The specimen was first mentioned in a 1995 paper describing the extinct tick Ornithodorus antiquus. Though mostly complete the exuvia is missing the right foreleg, the left middle leg, a small section of antenna and the anteocular region. Triatoma dominicana is the first extinct Triatominae species to be described from the fossil record. Included in the amber specimen are two fecal pellets from the insect which contain preserved flagellates of the extinct Trypanosoma antiquus. This association is the oldest known example of the vector association between Triatoma and Trypanosoma. T. dominicana lived in an environment similar to modern moist tropical rain forests.

Though similar to the modern genera Triatoma, Panstrongylus, and Eratyrus several physical characters in the specimen are distinct to Triatoma, the size, at 19.5 millimetres (0.77 in) being smaller than Eratyrus nymphs, and the head and thorax being granulose. Modern Hispaniola does not have an endemic population of Triatominae species and only the human introduced T. rubrofasciata. Of the three endemic Triatominae species found in the Greater Antilles T. dominicana resembles some features of T. obscura found on Jamaica. Based on the contents of the amber specimen including three hematophagous insects, it is likely to have been formed in a tree cavity. Associated with the insects are several mammal hairs from an unidentified Chiropteran, the likely host for T. dominicana.
