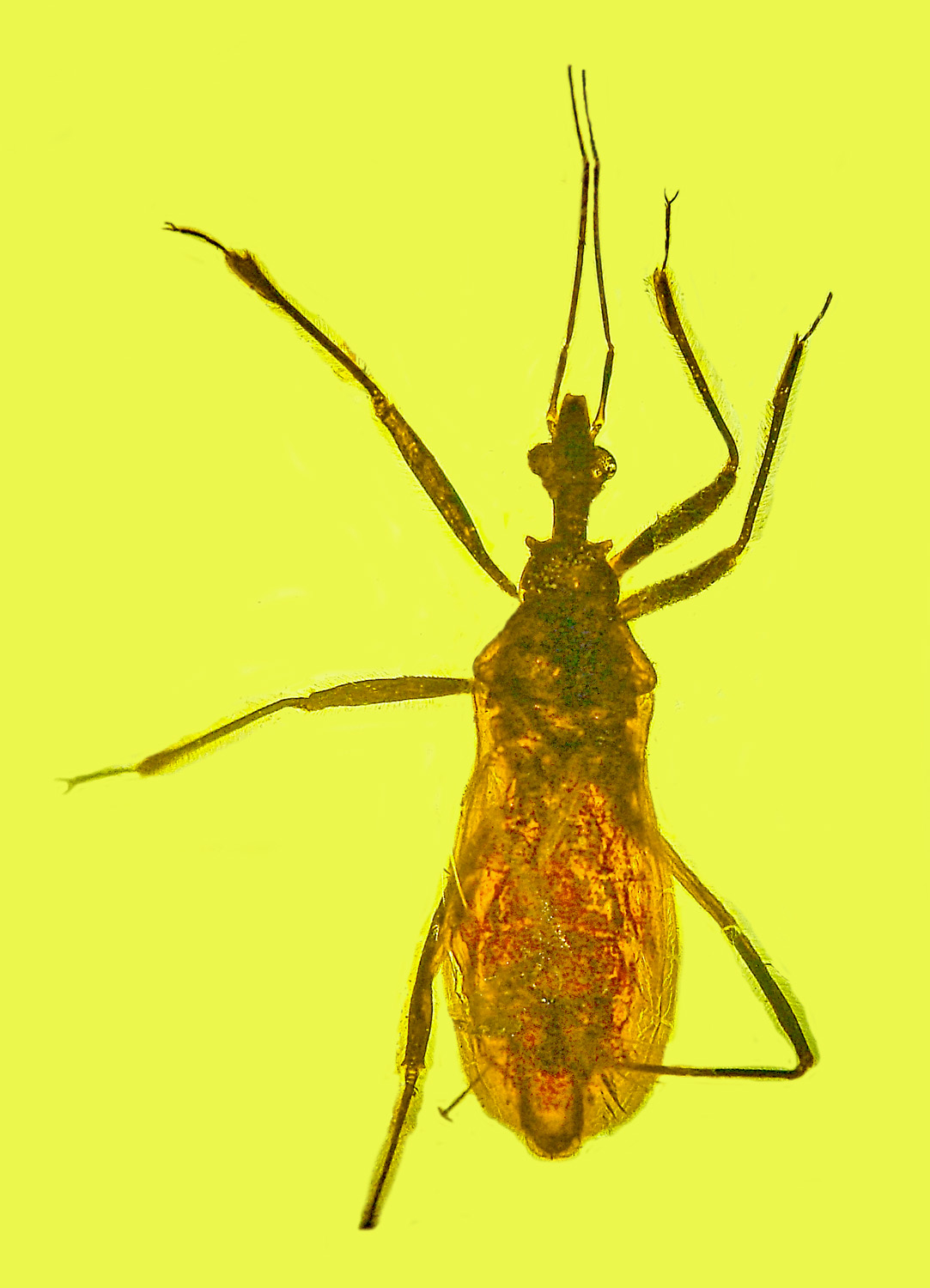
- Holotype

Scientific classification
- Domain: Eukaryota
- Kingdom: Animalia
- Phylum: Arthropoda
- Class: Insecta
- Order: Hemiptera
- Suborder: Heteroptera
- Family: Reduviidae
- Subfamily: Triatominae
- Genus: †Paleotriatoma; Poinar, 2018
- Species: †P. metaxytaxa

Binomial name
- †Paleotriatoma metaxytaxa Poinar, 2018

= Paleotriatoma =

Paleotriatoma Temporal range: Albian–Cenomanian

Extinct species of true bug

Paleotriatoma metaxytaxa is a species of fossil insect belonging to the subfamily Triatominae (kissing bugs) of the family Reduviidae. Living kissing bugs are blood-sucking insects responsible for the transmission of Chagas disease. Chagas is a parasitic disease affecting millions of people mainly in South America, Central America and Mexico.

The species was described from a single specimen with excellent preservation. The specimen was preserved in amber, in deposits from the Middle Cretaceous (possibly Albian) age. The specimen contains developing flagellated trypanosomes in its hindgut, suggesting that early triatomines might have been transmitting pathogenic protozoa to vertebrates as early as 100 million years (Ma).

== Etymology ==
The name of the genus, Paleotriatoma, comes from the Greek “paleo” = ancient and the name of the existing genus, Triatoma. The specific epithet, that is, the term metaxytaxa, is taken from the Greek “metxy” = between and also from the Greek, “tasso” = to dispose, referring to the intermediate state of the fossil, which has anatomical characteristics of Reduviinae and Triatominae.

== Preservation of the specimen ==
The species P. metaxytaxa was described from a single fossil male specimen with excellent preservation. The quality of the preservation is due to the fact that they were preserved in amber, which is the result of the petrification (diagenesis) of tree resins in which numerous remains of organisms were trapped while they were alive.

The specimen was found at the Noije Bum Mount Amber Mine, excavated in the Hukawng Valley and located southwest of Maingkhwan in the Kachin State of Burma. Based on paleontological evidence, this site was dated as late Albian, in the Lower Cretaceous, with ages between 97 and 110 million years. A more recent study used U-Pb dating of zircons, which determined the age to be 98.79 ± 0.62 million years. This result places these deposits on the border between the Albian and the Cenomanian. Burmese amber would have been formed from the resin emanating from a tree within the Araucariaceae group, possibly from the Agathis genus.

== Importance in the evolutionary and biogeographic knowledge of the species ==
With the exception of triatomines (kissing bugs, vinchuca, and various other names), species in the Reduviidae family feed on insects, which they prey on. Living triatomines are exclusively hematophagous, that is, they feed by sucking the blood of vertebrates. Paleotriatoma metaxytaxa, contains a predominance of Triatominae anatomical features, as well as some Reduviinae characters. Therefore, it is considered an intermediate fossil representing an early progenitor of the Triatominae. Since the Triatominae probably evolved from the Reduviinae, insect feeding can be considered a primitive characteristic. It is inferred then that the first triatomines probably fed on both insects and vertebrates, and that hematophagy originated only once in the family Reduviidae. Likewise, the first triatomines that fed on vertebrates would have been transient forms. which possessed both Triatominae and Reduviinae morphological characteristics, similar to P. metaxytaxa.

Triatomines, that is, blood-sucking bugs, were previously considered to be endemic to South America. It was argued that their diversification was due to changes resulting from the uplift of the Andes and variations in sea levels in North America, which isolated the subcontinent. Evidence now indicates that triatomines originated in Gondwana. The fossil of P. metaxytaxa, found in Myanmar, is not an exception: the portion of Earth's crust containing the amber deposits migrated from Gondwana to its current location. This scenario is consistent with the current distribution of the subfamily with important representatives in America South, Africa, India and Australia.
