= P. cavernicola =

P. cavernicola may refer to:

- Pachyseius cavernicola, a mite species
- Pilea cavernicola, a herbaceous plant species native to China
- Polystichum cavernicola, a fern known only from a limestone cave in China

== See also ==
- Cavernicola (disambiguation)
