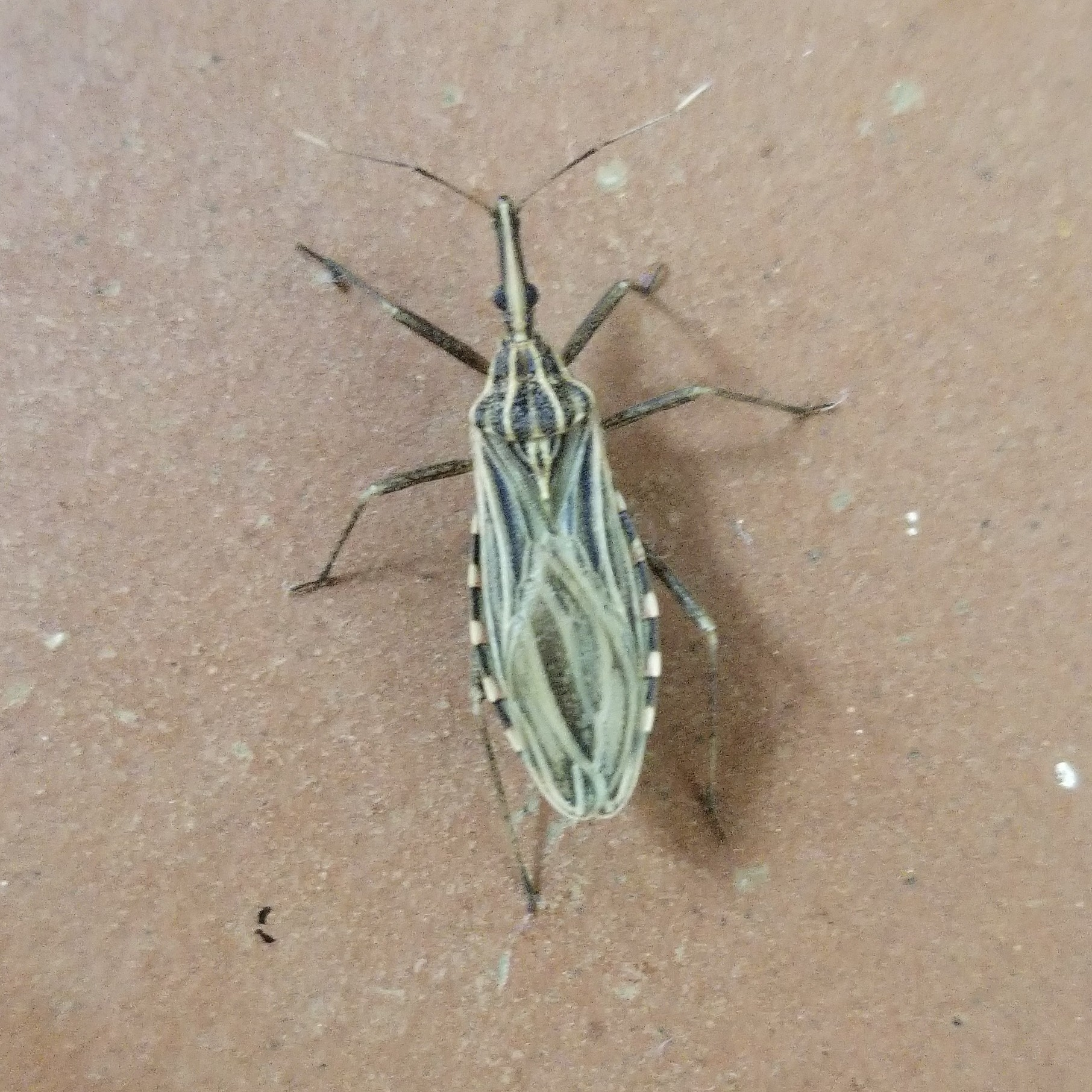

Scientific classification
- Kingdom: Animalia
- Phylum: Arthropoda
- Class: Insecta
- Order: Hemiptera
- Suborder: Heteroptera
- Family: Reduviidae
- Genus: Rhodnius
- Species: R. pallescens

Binomial name
- Rhodnius pallescens Barber, 1932

= Rhodnius pallescens =

Species of insect

Rhodnius pallescens is a species of assassin bug. The species was originally described by H.G. Barber in 1932. This species is the main vector of Chagas disease in Panamá.
