= Parabelminus =

Scientific classification
- Kingdom: Animalia
- Phylum: Arthropoda
- Clade: Pancrustacea
- Class: Insecta
- Order: Hemiptera
- Suborder: Heteroptera
- Family: Reduviidae
- Subfamily: Triatominae
- Tribe: Bolboderini
- Genus: Parabelminus

Species
- See text.

Genus of true bugs

Parabelminus is a genus of bugs in the subfamily Triatominae. The species of this genus could be found in Brazil, specially in Rio de Janeiro and Bahia. It is a vector of Chagas disease.

== Species ==
This genus has two known species:

- P. carioca Lent, 1943 (Tc)
- P. yurupucu Lent & Wygodzinsky, 1979

(Tc) means associated with Trypanosoma cruzi
