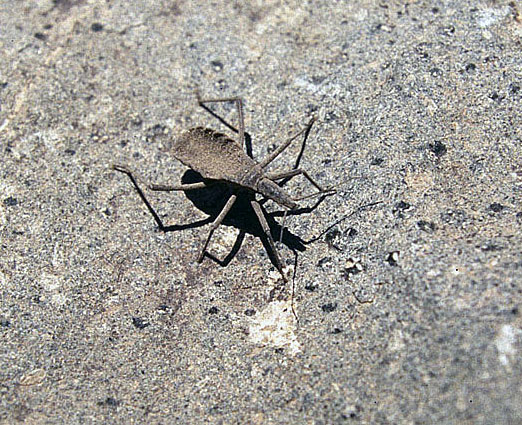
- Mepraia spinolai in central Chile

Scientific classification
- Kingdom: Animalia
- Phylum: Arthropoda
- Clade: Pancrustacea
- Class: Insecta
- Order: Hemiptera
- Suborder: Heteroptera
- Family: Reduviidae
- Subfamily: Triatominae
- Tribe: Triatomini
- Genus: Mepraia; Mazza, Gajardo & Jörg, 1940

Species
- See text.

= Mepraia =

Genus of true bugs

Mepraia is a genus in the subfamily Triatominae, endemic in Chile, and vectors of Chagas disease.

== Species ==
- Mepraia eratyrusiformis (Del Ponte, 1929)
- Mepraia gajardoi Frías, Henry & González, 1998
- Mepraia parapatrica Frías, 2010
- Mepraia spinolai (Porter, 1934)
