= D. maxima =

D. maxima may refer to:

- Dipetalogaster maxima, a kissing bug
- Doodia maxima, an eastern Australian fern
