= Xenointoxication =

Pest control technique

Xenointoxication is a form of pest control in which an ectoparasite's host animal is dosed with a substance that is poisonous to the parasite. When the parasite feeds on its host, it is poisoned, and eventually dies.

An example of this strategy is the experimental use of oral ivermectin in humans to kill bed bugs and parasitic worms. This technique has also been used to combat other ectoparasites.

This method was unsuccessful in a 1969 study attempting to control Triatoma infestans in chicken houses because even though some bugs that fed on the treated birds did die, so did the birds, and the birds that survived produced fewer eggs.

Treating dogs with deltamethrin to break the life cycle of triatomines, which feed on them, has been successful and may improve the management of Chagas disease.
