= Rhodnius nasutus =

Scientific classification
- Kingdom: Animalia
- Phylum: Arthropoda
- Clade: Pancrustacea
- Class: Insecta
- Order: Hemiptera
- Suborder: Heteroptera
- Family: Reduviidae
- Genus: Rhodnius
- Species: R. nasutus

Binomial name
- Rhodnius nasutus Stål, 1859

Species of true bug

Rhodnius nasutus is a Chagas disease vector native to the northeast of Brazil. It belongs to the family Reduviidae and subfamily Triatominae, which are commonly known as "kissing bugs" or "assassin bugs". They are considered a highly important species concerning the infectious Chagas disease as they carry the parasite Trypanosoma cruzi, that can be transmitted to the blood of mammals, including humans. This disease is an important issue in Brazil and central America due to the large number of Rhodnius species inhabiting these areas, however in recent efforts to reduce human infection, multiple variations of pesticides have dramatically reduced Triatomine populations. Therefore, the understanding and knowledge of Rhodnius nasutus greatly benefits our efforts in reducing life threatening infections.

== Identification ==
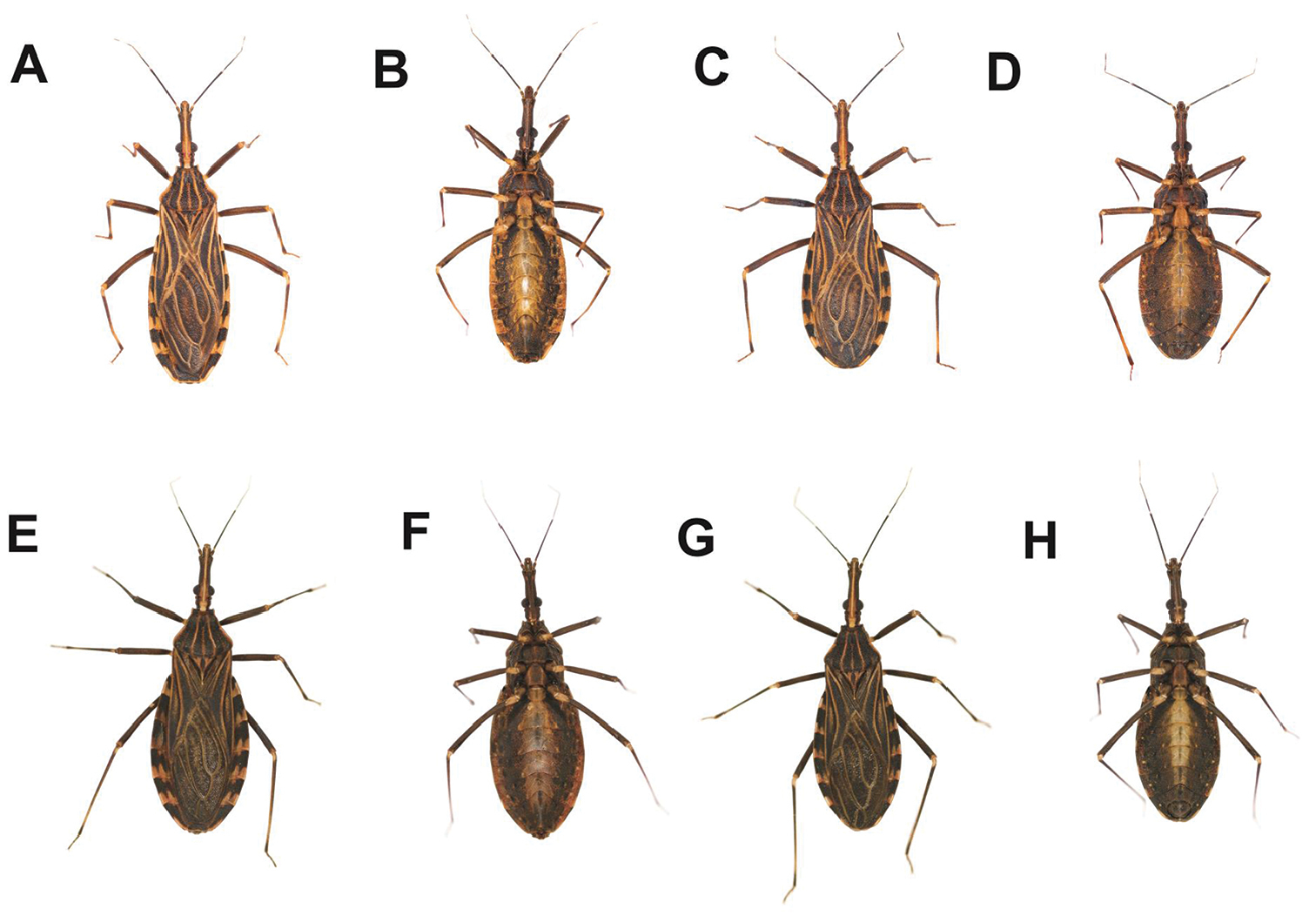
This figure shows the coloration and pattern schemes of Rhodnius species.

R. nasutus species are known for their chromatic pattern and range from red to chestnut-colored. These color differences have been hypothesized in many studies to correlate with the species of palm that the insect inhabits. Connection to the coloration of R. nasutus and the colors found on the stems and frond bases of the inhabited palm tree suggests a way of camouflage.

== Systematics ==
The Rhodnius species are especially hard to decipher from one another as they are morphologically similar, thus taxonomy has been controversial regarding their independence. Accurately identifying R. nasutus from other species with common features plays an important role in reducing human contact with these vectors. Random amplification of polymorphic DNA (RAPD) can identify taxonomic relationships on a molecular level providing valid phylogenetic evidence on speciation. The continuation of this practice is essential for following disease transmission dynamics.

== Distribution ==
=== Genetic phylogeography ===
Using mitochondrial DNA sequence analysis, R. nasutus has been dated 66 thousand years, giving rise to stable populations during the Pleistocene-Holocene epochs. This time frame is consistent with the climate change event that took place in South America which marked the end of a major drought and dry season.

=== Geographical range ===
R. nasutus is predominantly found in the caatinga biome of Northeast Brazil, although due to increased deforestation and environmental damage the insect has expanded its geographic range and habitat. The species is primarily associated with the Copernicia prunifera palm tree (Carnaúba) in this area, however more recently they have been found colonizing suburban areas such as Jaguaruana, Ceará, and infesting various other palms including Licania rigida (now Microdesmia rigida) (Oiticica). The allocation of chemical measures in rural areas have pushed these insects to colonize closer to localities and urban districts. Migration into central areas of Brazil pose a threat to humans as it increases the risk of contracting Chagas disease.

=== Habitat ===
When compared to other species of the genera, R. nasutus is found to thrive better in dryer and warmer conditions. Palms located in semi-arid, higher-altitude environments inhabit greater populations compared to palms located in lower elevations where flooding occurs during rainy seasons.

The insect is found predominantly in the crowns of palm trees, they burrow their bodies into the auxiliary nodes and foliar sheaths of palms, which act as a barrier to protect them from environmental and predatory threats.

More recently, R. nasutus has been found infesting homes and farm buildings, including corrals and coops.

== Human Intervention ==
=== Chemical controls ===
In efforts to inhibit human contraction of diseases harbored by R. nasutus, preventative measures such as chemical controls (insecticides) are distributed to high density Triatomine areas, including human dwellings. Although, the continuous re-infestation of homes that had been treated with insecticides presents the need for further research in controlling populations.

==== History of chemical control ====
The first insecticide used in Brazil to reduce infestations was a synthetic DDT formulation which was later found to have negative impacts on the environment. In 1970, a lindane and dieldrin compound insecticide was used until a safer organophosphorus and carbamate insecticide was formulated in the 1980's. This insecticide however, emitted a strong odor and stained walls of houses undergoing extermination. The favored and most recent insecticide used on R. nasutus is a pyrethroid formula, although the evolution of insecticide resistance has been documented in some Triatomine species.

=== Biological controls ===
Biological controls such as the "Mark-Release-Recapture" (MRR) method, involving the placement and evaluation of trace elements in R. nasutus, allows for long-lasting molecular marking under natural conditions. This method aims to identify host-seeking behaviors of the insect by tracking migration and population dispersion. Understanding the movement of these insect vectors provides important information regarding medical insights and preventative measures towards the transmission of Chagas disease. Other biological controls such as dusting and physically marking the insect are not as effective as growing nymphs will eventually shed the marked cuticle.

== Diet and feeding ==
=== Diet ===
R. nasutus is a hematophagous insect and will feed on blood through all life stages. Their main hosts are birds and mammals, however there is evidence that these insects will find invertebrates hosts and feed on hemolymph.

=== Feeding behaviour ===
Compared to other Rhondius species, R. nasutus displays a slower feeding time around 15-20 minutes before full engorgement. They are solenophagous insects so in order to feed they must find a suitable blood vessel in their host. During the probing period, the maxillae that is pierced into the hosts skin contract in rapid whip-like movements until a blood vessel is detected from which they can feed on. During feeding the cibarial pump, which is connected to strong muscles in the head, regulate the suction and volume intake of bloodmeal through the proboscis. Saliva plays an important role in the probing period to find blood, as well as the feeding period to regulate the flow of blood via the proboscis. R. nasutus has adapted highly efficient salivary glands which reduces the time is takes for them to find blood vessels.

== Transmission of T. cruzi ==
This video shows the parasite load in the digestive tract of a Rhodnius species.

Feeding done by R. nasutus is one of the leading causes of T. cuzi parasites being transmitted to mammals, which leads to Chagas disease. T. cruzi is found in the fecal matter of infected R. nasutus and is transmitted to mammals through the blood stream. While feeding or immediately after feeding, the vector insect will defecate on their host near the pierced skin. If the host disrupts the fecal matter by scratching or any other means of moving the feces around, T. cruzi will be able to get in through the pierced skin where it then spreads disease throughout the bloodstream.

== External sources ==
This video shows how the transmission of harmful diseases via T. cruzi is not limited to Latin America and Brazil, but has made its way through other Rhodnius species posing threats to Americans in Tennessee, US.

This video establishes in more detail how T. cruzi gets into the bloodstream and how Chagas disease affects the body.
