= Cavernicola =

Cavernicola, cave-dwelling in Latin, may refer to:

== Music ==
- Cavernicola CD, a CD by the band Los Peyotes
- Cavernivola Records, a label by the band Che Sudaka
- Tatán Cavernícola, a member of Chilean band Pánico

== Biology ==
- Cavernicola (bug), a genus of assassin bugs in the family Reduviidae
- Cavernicola (suborder), a cave-dwelling suborder of tricladid flatworms
