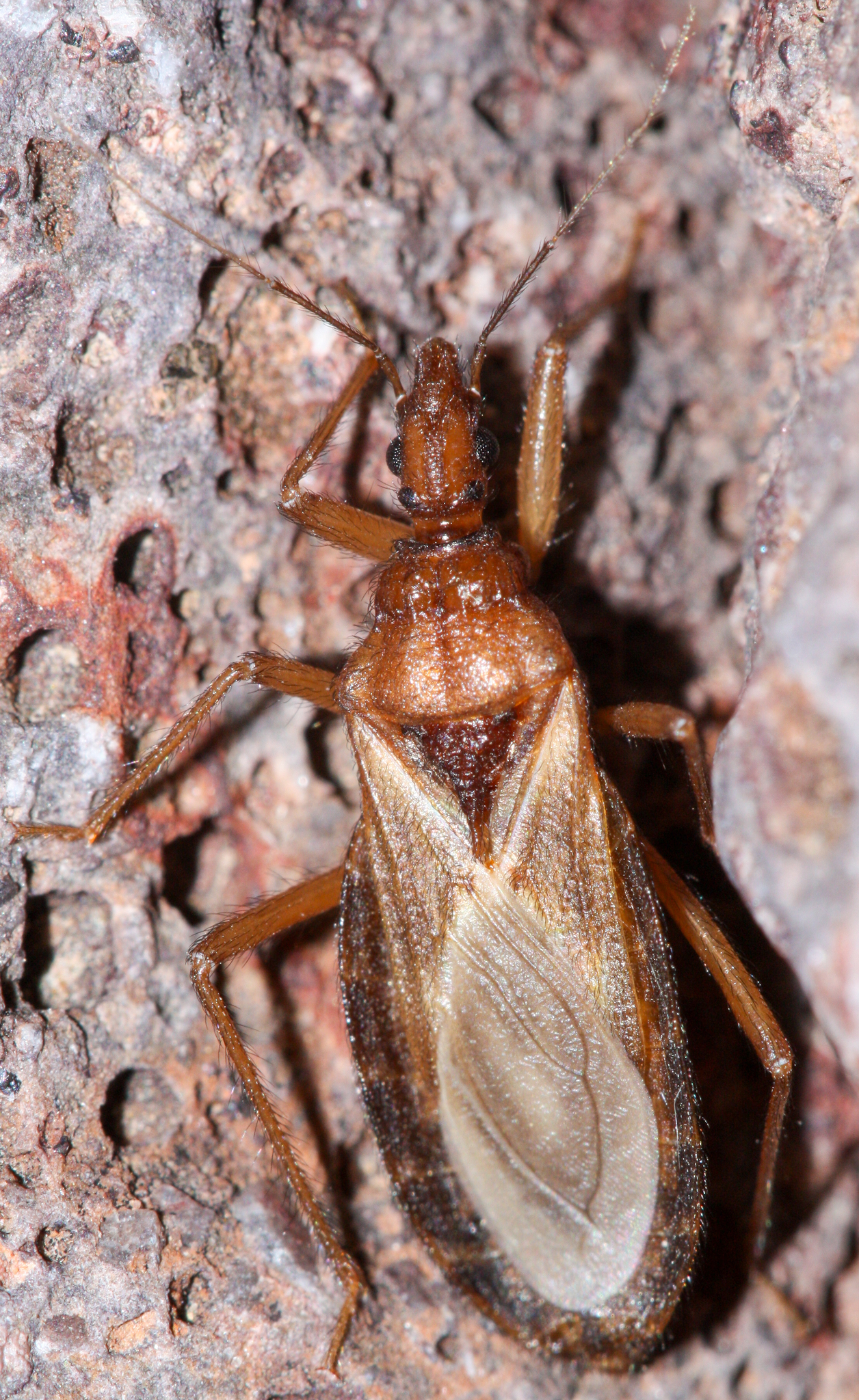

Scientific classification
- Kingdom: Animalia
- Phylum: Arthropoda
- Clade: Pancrustacea
- Class: Insecta
- Order: Hemiptera
- Suborder: Heteroptera
- Family: Reduviidae
- Genus: Paratriatoma; Barber, 1938
- Species: P. hirsuta

Binomial name
- Paratriatoma hirsuta Barber, 1938

= Paratriatoma =

Genus of true bugs

Paratriatoma is a genus of kissing bugs in the family Reduviidae. There is one described species in Paratriatoma, Paratriatoma hirsuta.
