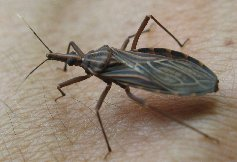
- Rhodnius prolixus

Scientific classification
- Domain: Eukaryota
- Kingdom: Animalia
- Phylum: Arthropoda
- Class: Insecta
- Order: Hemiptera
- Suborder: Heteroptera
- Family: Reduviidae
- Subfamily: Triatominae
- Tribe: Rhodniini
- Genus: Rhodnius; Stål, 1859

Species
- See text

= Rhodnius =

Genus of true bugs

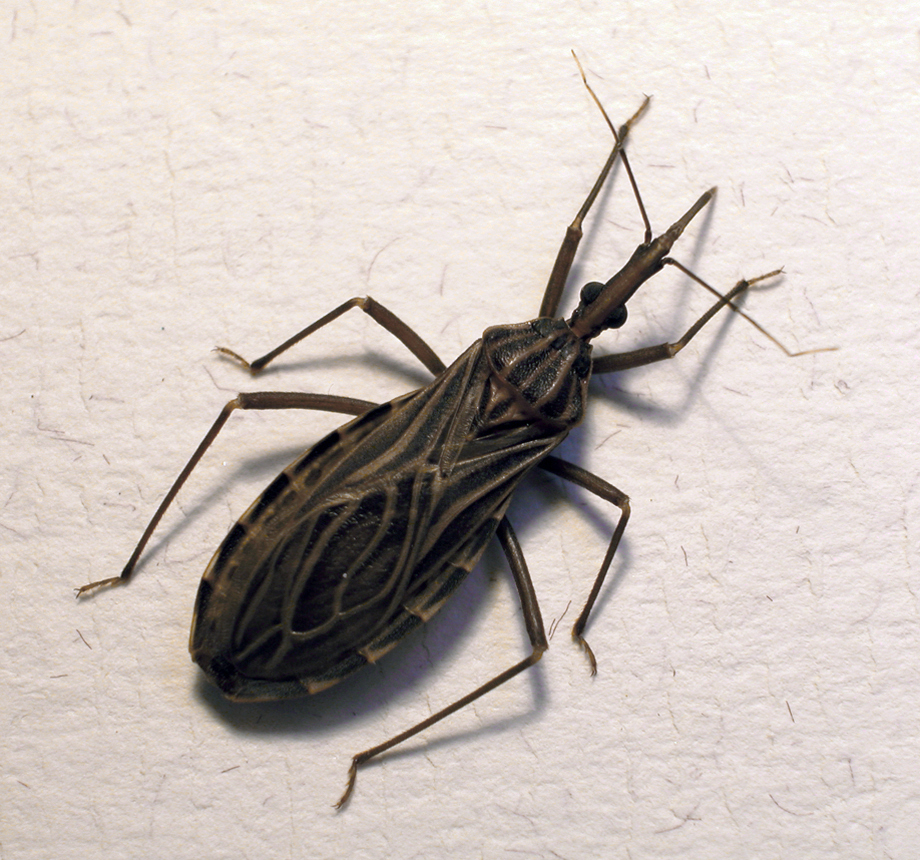
Rhodnius prolixus

Rhodnius is a genus of assassin bugs in the subfamily Triatominae (the kissing bugs), and is an important vector in the spread of Chagas disease. The Rhodnius species were important models for Sir Vincent Wigglesworth's studies of insect physiology, specifically growth and development.

== Species ==
- Rhodnius amazonicus Almeida, Santos & Sposina, 1973
- Rhodnius brethesi Matta, 1919 (Tc)
- Rhodnius colombiensis Moreno Mejía, Galvão & Jurberg, 1999
- Rhodnius dalessandroi Carcavallo & Barreto, 1976
- Rhodnius domesticus Neiva & Pinto, 1923 (Tc)
- Rhodnius ecuadoriensis Lent & León, 1958 (Tc)
- Rhodnius milesi Carcavallo, Rocha, Galvão, Jurberg, 2001
- Rhodnius nasutus Stål, 1859 (Tc)
- Rhodnius neglectus Lent, 1954 (Tc)
- Rhodnius neivai Lent, 1953
- Rhodnius pallescens Barber, 1932 (Tc) (principal vector in Panama).
- Rhodnius paraensis Sherlock, Guitton & Miles, 1977 (Tc)
- Rhodnius pictipes Stål, 1872 (Tc)
- Rhodnius prolixus Stål, 1859 (Tc) (principal vector in Colombia and Venezuela, and in Guatemala, Honduras and some parts of Nicaragua and El Salvador).
- Rhodnius robustus Larrousse, 1927 (Tc)
- Rhodnius stali Lent, Jurberg & Galvão, 1993 (Tc)

Species marked with (Tc) are associated with Trypanosoma cruzi
