= Psammolestes =

Scientific classification
- Kingdom: Animalia
- Phylum: Arthropoda
- Class: Insecta
- Order: Hemiptera
- Suborder: Heteroptera
- Family: Reduviidae
- Subfamily: Triatominae
- Tribe: Rhodniini
- Genus: Psammolestes; Bergroth, 1911

Species
- See text.

Genus of true bugs

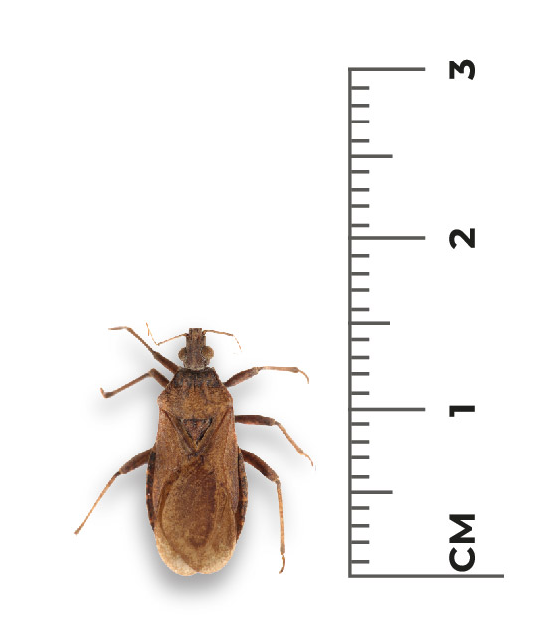

The genus Psammolestes belongs to the subfamily Triatominae. It can be found in the nests of various birds, mainly in the family Furnariidae.

3 species:

- Psammolestes arthuri (Pinto, 1926) (Tc)
- Psammolestes coreodes Bergroth, 1911
- Psammolestes tertius Lent & Jurberg, 1965 (Tc)

(Tc) means associated with Trypanosoma cruzi
