= Cecilio Romaña =

Argentine physician (1899–1997)

Cecilio Félix Romaña (1899–1997 in Barcelona) was an Argentine physician remembered for describing Romaña's sign, as he was the first to describe the phenomenon. Romaña's sign is a medical term for the unilateral painless periorbital swelling associated with the acute stage of Chagas' disease. Romaña's Sign should not be confused with a chagoma.

He researched tropical diseases from 1930 to 1960 in Northern Argentina, particularly Chagas disease. His description of his eponymous sign in 1935 allowed for earlier and easier diagnosis of this disease in endemic areas. In 1942 he became the first director of the Regional Institute of Medicine at the National University of the Northeast.

One of his lesser known achievements is his work as a sculptor.
