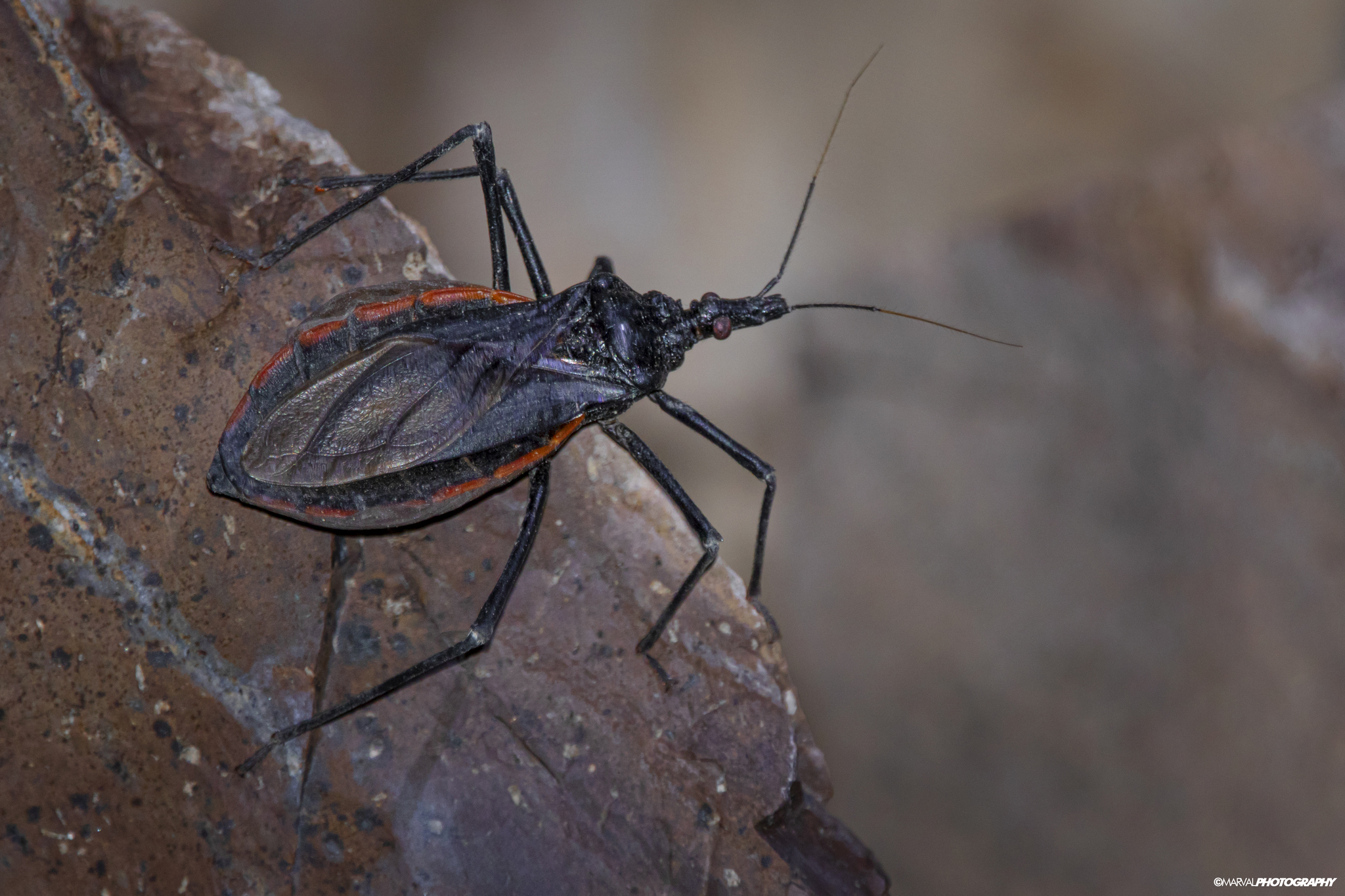

Scientific classification
- Kingdom: Animalia
- Phylum: Arthropoda
- Class: Insecta
- Order: Hemiptera
- Suborder: Heteroptera
- Family: Reduviidae
- Subfamily: Triatominae
- Tribe: Triatomini
- Genus: Dipetalogaster; Usinger, 1939
- Species: D. maxima

Binomial name
- Dipetalogaster maxima (Uhler, 1894)

= Dipetalogaster =

Genus of true bugs

Dipetalogaster, a genus of Triatominae, the kissing bugs, has only a single species, Dipetalogaster maxima (often misspelled as "maximus", e.g.), which is found in the Mexican state of Baja California Sur. Originally the blood-sucking Dipetalogaster lived in crevices in rocks where it typically fed on lizards, but following human growth in its range it now also commonly feeds on humans and domestic animals.

Dipetalogaster is routinely infected by the Chagas disease parasite Trypanosoma cruzi. In contrast to this risk, laboratory kept Dipetalogaster can be used for extracting blood samples from animals where other methods are stressful or risky (such as certain zoo animals and wild animals). The bite of Dipetalogaster is essentially painless because of the very thin mouthpart apparatus (about 0.02 mm or 0.8 thou, far less than a typical hypodermic needle) and the anaesthetic effect of its saliva. The blood can be extracted from the Dipetalogaster without killing it and with few exceptions (such as sodium and potassium) show no differences compared to blood extracted using conventional methods.

At up to 5 cm (2.0 in) in length, Dipetalogaster is the largest species of the subfamily, but otherwise it resembles the better-known Rhodnius prolixus.
