= Alberprosenia =

Scientific classification
- Kingdom: Animalia
- Phylum: Arthropoda
- Class: Insecta
- Order: Hemiptera
- Suborder: Heteroptera
- Family: Reduviidae
- Subfamily: Triatominae
- Tribe: Alberproseniini; Martínez & Carcavallo, 1977
- Genus: Alberprosenia; Martínez & Carcavallo, 1977

Genus of true bugs

The tribe Alberproseniini Martínez & Carcavallo, 1977 belongs to the Triatominae subfamily of kissing bugs and only has one genus, Alberprosenia Martínez & Carcavallo, 1977, with two species:

- Alberprosenia goyovargasi Martínez & Carcavallo, 1977 – Zulia, Venezuela
- Alberprosenia malheiroi Serra, Atzingen & Serra, 1980 – Pará, Brazil
