= Cavernicola (bug) =

Scientific classification
- Domain: Eukaryota
- Kingdom: Animalia
- Phylum: Arthropoda
- Class: Insecta
- Order: Hemiptera
- Suborder: Heteroptera
- Family: Reduviidae
- Subfamily: Triatominae
- Tribe: Cavernicolini; Usinger, 1944
- Genus: Cavernicola (Barber, 1937)

Genus of true bugs

Cavernicola is a genus of assassin bugs in the family Reduviidae. They are endemic to Panama and northern South America. Like other members of the subfamily Triatominae, Cavernicola species primarily feed on vertebrate blood. Like other members of the subfamily, Cavernicola spp. can potentially transmit Trypanosoma cruzi (a known cause of Chagas disease), but they are not considered important vectors as they are strictly found in wild ecotopes and do not occur around dwellings.

Cavernicola pilosa feeds primarily on bats, but has been reported as biting humans.

== Species ==
- Cavernicola lenti (Barrett & Arias, 1985)
- Cavernicola pilosa (Barber, 1937)
