= GNF6702 =

Chemical compound

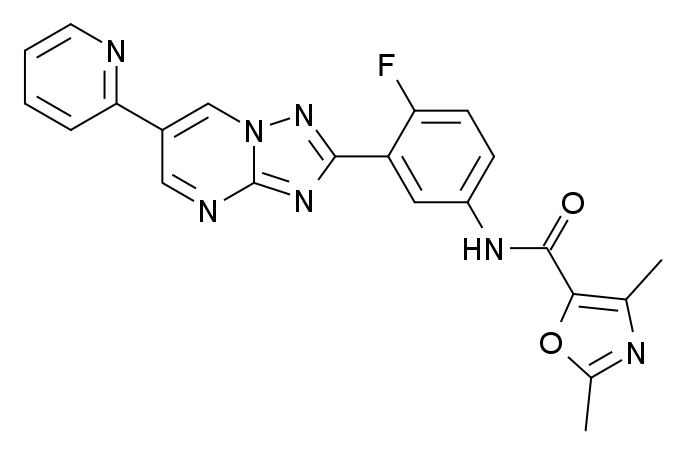

Identifiers
- IUPAC name: N-[4-fluoro-3-(6-pyridin-2-yl-[1,2,4]triazolo[1,5-a]pyrimidin-2-yl)phenyl]-2,4-dimethyl-1,3-oxazole-5-carboxamide
- CAS Number: 1799329-72-8
- PubChem CID: 91810392
- ChemSpider: 58827646
- UNII: 9NKU4X5ZKZ
- ChEBI: CHEBI:133824
- CompTox Dashboard (EPA): DTXSID201336032

Chemical and physical data
- Formula: C_{22}H_{16}FN_{7}O_{3}
- Molar mass: 445.414 g·mol^{−1}
- 3D model (JSmol): Interactive image
- SMILES: n5ccccc5-c(cn1n4)cnc1nc4-c3cc(ccc3F)NC(=O)c2oc(C)nc2C
- InChI: InChI=1S/C22H16FN7O2/c1-12-19(32-13(2)26-12)21(31)27-15-6-7-17(23)16(9-15)20-28-22-25-10-14(11-30(22)29-20)18-5-3-4-8-24-18/h3-11H,1-2H3,(H,27,31); Key:WXZFCGRYVWYYTG-UHFFFAOYSA-N

GNF6702 is the name for a broad-spectrum antiprotozoal drug invented by researchers working at the Genomics Institute of the Novartis Research Foundation in 2013, with activity against leishmaniasis, Chagas disease and sleeping sickness. These three diseases are caused by related kinetoplastid parasites, which share similar biology. GNF6702 acts as allosteric proteasome inhibitor which was effective against infection with any of the three protozoal diseases in mice, while having little evident toxicity to mammalian cells.

== See also ==
- Proteasome inhibitor
