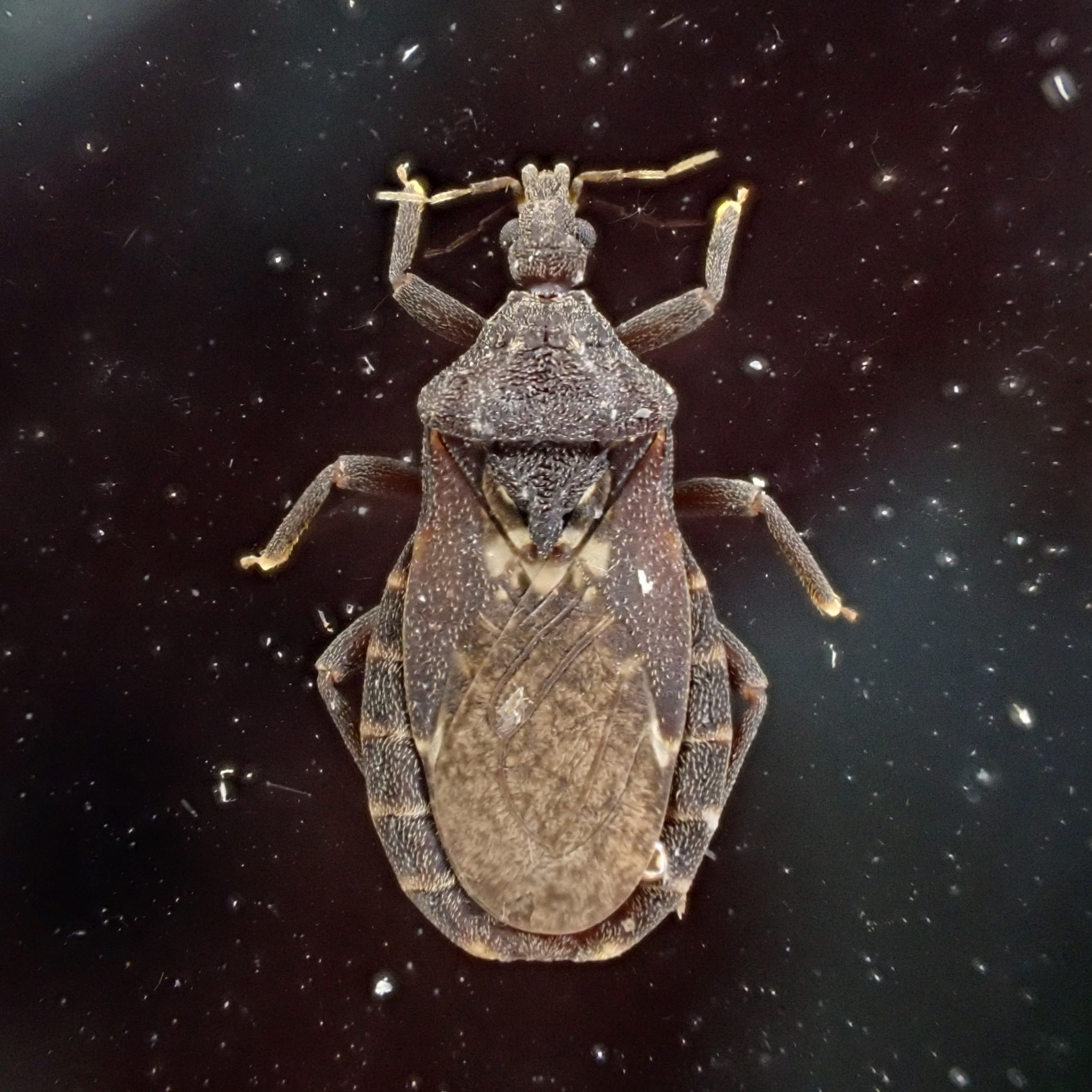
- Microtriatoma trinidadensis

Scientific classification
- Kingdom: Animalia
- Phylum: Arthropoda
- Class: Insecta
- Order: Hemiptera
- Suborder: Heteroptera
- Family: Reduviidae
- Subfamily: Triatominae
- Tribe: Bolboderini
- Genus: Microtriatoma (Prosen & Martínez, 1952)

Species
- See text.

= Microtriatoma =

Genus of true bugs

Microtriatoma is a genus of bugs that belongs to the subfamily Triatominae.

== Species ==
This genus has two known species:

- M. borbai (Lent & Wygodzinsky, 1979 (Tc))
- M. trinidadensis (Lent, 1951)

(Tc) means associated with Trypanosoma cruzi
