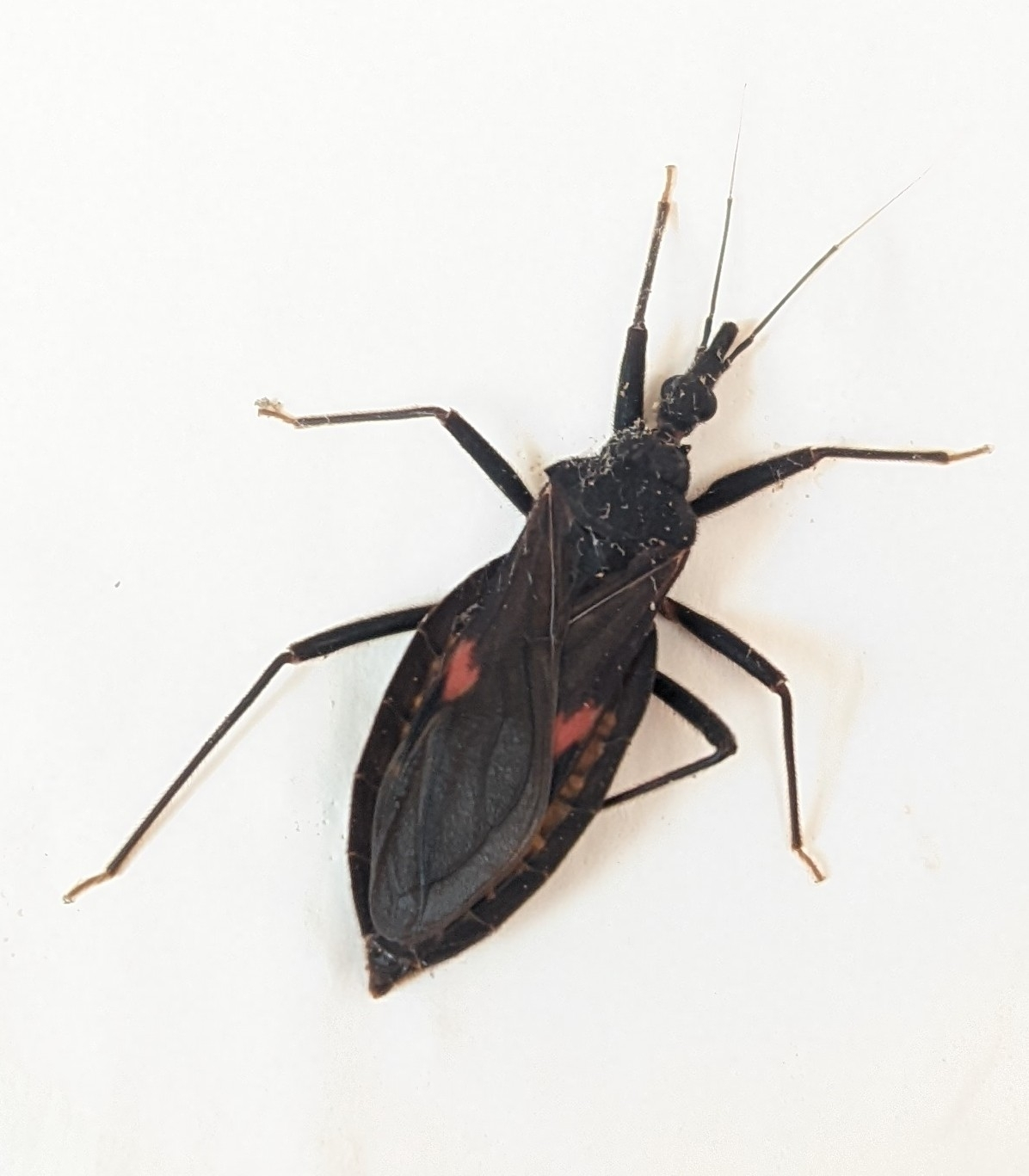
- Eratyrus cuspidatus

Scientific classification
- Kingdom: Animalia
- Phylum: Arthropoda
- Class: Insecta
- Order: Hemiptera
- Suborder: Heteroptera
- Family: Reduviidae
- Subfamily: Triatominae
- Tribe: Triatomini
- Genus: Eratyrus; Stål, 1859

= Eratyrus =

Genus of true bugs

Eratyrus is a genus of insects belonging to the assassin bug subfamily Triatominae.

This genus has a wide distribution throughout central and northern South America and Central America.

There are two species in this genus; both are associated with Trypanosoma cruzi:

- Eratyrus cuspidatus (Stål, 1859)
- Eratyrus mucronatus (Stål, 1859)
