= Los Peyotes =

Music group from Argentina and Peru

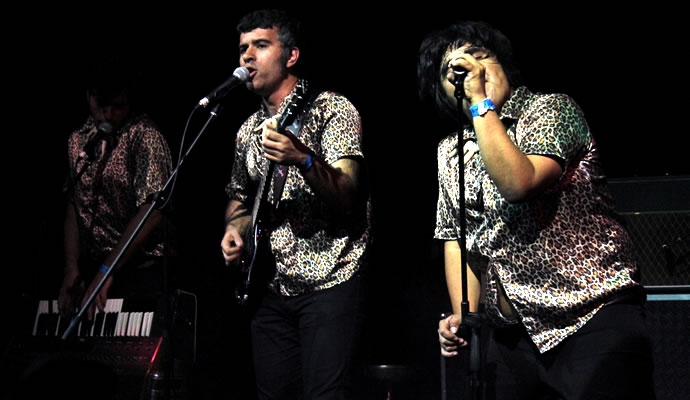
Live concert in 2015

Los Peyotes is a garage rock and surf rock music group from Argentina, signed to Dirty Water Records. Los Peyotes were formed in 1996 and take their name from the hallucinogen called Lophophora williamsii. The band's style is based on garage, proto punk and indie rock. They are characterized by making music from the 60s and wearing vintage clothing at their concerts.

The lyrics of their songs are sung in English and Spanish. The band's music has been strongly influenced by artists like: The Seeds, The Sonics, Los Saicos, Los York's, Los Gatos, Los Shakers and Los Iracundos, among others.

From their 2005 debut album, Caveman, the band acquired popularity, not only in Argentina and Peru, but also in other countries. The band has toured internationally and toured in countries such as: Spain, Mexico, Uruguay, Chile, Brazil, etc.

== Members ==
- Pablo Bam Bam - Drums and Screams
- Zelmar Garín- Lead Fuzz Guitar and Screams
- David Peyote - Vocals, Guitar and Maracas
- J.R Lemons - Farfisa Organ and Screams
- Oscar Hechomierda - Bass and Screams

== Discography ==
- Psychotic Reaction (Animal Records, 2002)
- Cavernicola (Rockaway Records, 2005)
- El Humo Te Hace Mal 7 (Dirty Water Records, 2007)
- Introducing Los Peyotes (Dirty Water Records, 2008)
- Bdaaa111 7 (Dirty Water Records, 2008)
- Garage o Muerte (Dirty Water Records, 2010)

== Tours ==
- European Tour 2007
- European Tour 2008
- European Tour 2009
- European Tour 2010
- México, Peru y Chile Tour 2010
- México, Peru y Chile Tour 2011
- México, Peru y Chile Tour 2011
- Mexico, Brasil Tour 2013
- Colombia Tour 2015
