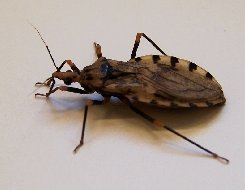

Scientific classification
- Kingdom: Animalia
- Phylum: Arthropoda
- Clade: Pancrustacea
- Class: Insecta
- Order: Hemiptera
- Suborder: Heteroptera
- Family: Reduviidae
- Subfamily: Triatominae; Jeannel, 1919

Tribes
- Alberproseniini; Bolboderini; Cavernicolini; Linshcosteusinii; Rhodniini; Triatomini

= Triatominae =

Triatominae Temporal range: Cenomanian–Recent

Subfamily of true bugs

The members of the Triatominae /traɪ.əˈtɒmɪniː/, a subfamily of the Reduviidae, are also known as conenose bugs, kissing bugs (so-called from their habit of feeding from around the mouths of people), or vampire bugs. Other local names for them, used in Latin America and by Latinos generally, include barbeiros, vinchucas, pitos, chipos and chinches. Most of the 130 or more species of this subfamily feed on vertebrate blood; a very small portion of species feed on invertebrates. They are mainly found and widespread in the Americas, with a few species present in Asia and Africa. These bugs usually share shelter with nesting vertebrates, from which they suck blood. In areas where Chagas disease occurs (from the southern United States to northern Argentina), all triatomine species are potential vectors of the Chagas disease parasite Trypanosoma cruzi, but only those species that are well adapted to living with humans (such as Triatoma infestans and Rhodnius prolixus) are considered important vectors. Also, proteins released from their bites have been known to induce anaphylaxis in sensitive and sensitized individuals.

== History ==
At the beginning of the 19th century, Charles Darwin made one of the first reports of the existence of triatomines in America in his Journal and Remarks, published in 1839 and commonly known as The Voyage of the Beagle. The following is an extract which he based on his journal entry dated 26 March 1835:

We crossed the Luxan, which is a river of considerable size, though its course towards the sea-coast is very imperfectly known. It is even doubtful whether, in passing over the plains, it is evaporated, or whether it forms a tributary of the Sauce or Colorado. We slept in the village, which is a small place surrounded by gardens, and forms the most southern part, that is cultivated, of the province of Mendoza; it is five leagues south of the capital. At night I experienced an attack (for it deserves no less a name) of the Benchuca (a species of Reduvius) the great black bug of the Pampas. It is most disgusting to feel soft wingless insects, about an inch long, crawling over one's body. Before sucking they are quite thin, but afterwards they become round and bloated with blood, and in this state are easily crushed. They are also found in the northern parts of Chile and in Peru. One which I caught at Iquique, was very empty. When placed on the table, and though surrounded by people, if a finger was presented, the bold insect would immediately draw its sucker, make a charge, and if allowed, draw blood. No pain was caused by the wound. It was curious to watch its body during the act of sucking, as it changed in less than ten minutes, from being as flat as a wafer to a globular form. This one feast, for which the benchuca was indebted to one of the officers, kept it fat during four whole months; but, after the first fortnight, the insect was quite ready to have another suck.

Considerable medical speculation has occurred as to whether or not Darwin's contact with triatomines in Argentina was related to his later bouts of long-term illness, though it is unlikely to have been caused on this specific occasion, as he made no mention of the fever that usually follows the first infection.

Modelling of the geographical distribution of triatomines in Chile shows that Darwin traveled extensively in the areas of central and northern Chile where these bugs occur, sleeping outdoors and in rural houses.

=== Discovery of link to Chagas disease ===
In 1909, Brazilian doctor Carlos Chagas discovered that these insects were responsible for the transmission of T. cruzi to many of his patients in Lassance, a village located on the banks of the São Francisco River in Minas Gerais (Brazil). Poor people living there complained of some insects they called barbeiros that bite during the night. Carlos Chagas put his first observations in words:

Knowing the domiciliary habits of the insect, and its abundance in all the human habitations of the region, we immediately stayed on, interested in finding out the exact biology of the barbeiro, and the transmission of some parasite to man or to another vertebrate.

Another Brazilian, Herman Lent, former student of Carlos Chagas, became devoted to the research of the triatomines and together with Peter Wygodzinsky made a revision of the Triatominae, a summary of 40 years of studies on the triatomines up to 1989.

== Biological aspects ==
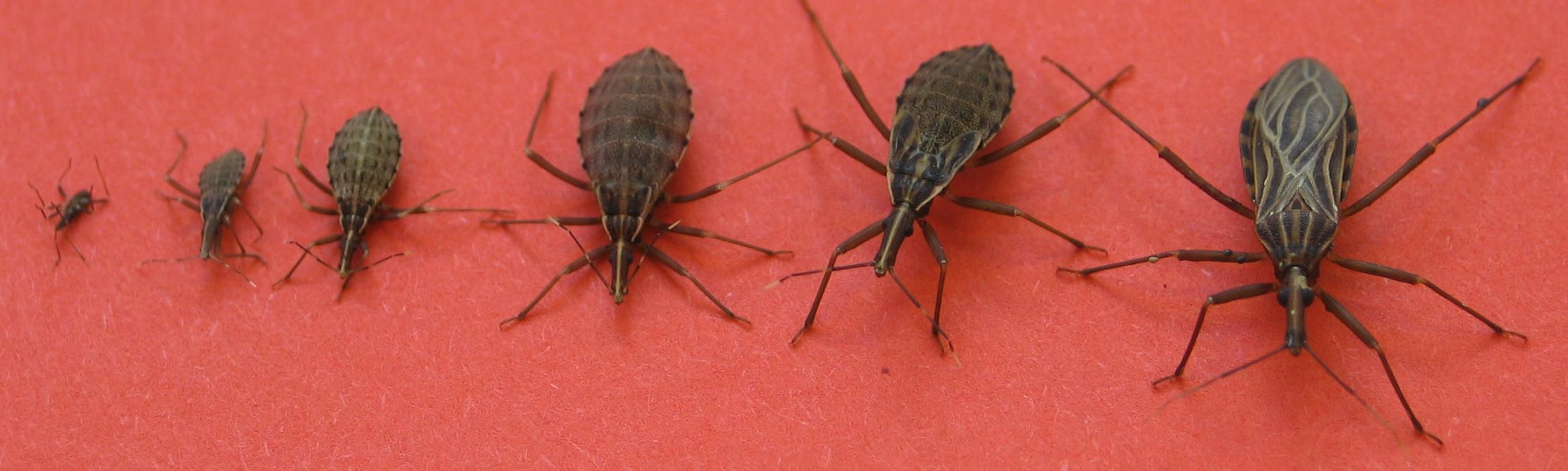
Rhodnius prolixus nymphs and adult

=== Life cycle ===
Triatomines undergo incomplete metamorphosis. A wingless first-instar nymph hatches from an egg, and may be small as 2 mm. It passes successively through second, third, fourth, and fifth instars. Finally, the fifth instar turns into an adult, acquiring two pairs of wings.

=== Ecology ===
All triatomine nymph instars and adults are haematophagous and require the stability of a sheltered environment, where they aggregate. Most species are associated with wild, nesting vertebrates and are named "sylvatic" triatomines. These live in ground burrows with rodents or armadillos, or in tree dwellings with bats, birds, sloths, or opossums. Few species (5%) live in human dwellings or in the surroundings of human houses (peridomicile) in the shelters of domestic animals, these are named "domestic" species. Many sylvatic species are in process of domiciliation (i.e. "semidomestic").

=== Behavior ===
Most triatomines aggregate in refuges during day and search for blood during night, when the host is asleep and the air is cooler. Odors and heat guide these insects to their hosts. Carbon dioxide emanating from breath, as well as ammonia, short-chain amines, and carboxylic acids from skin, hair, and exocrine glands from vertebrate animals, are among the volatiles that attract triatomines. Vision also serves triatomines for orientation. At night, adults of diverse species fly to inhabited areas, attracted by light.

Adults produce a pungent odor (isobutyric acid) when disturbed, and are also capable of producing a particular sound by rubbing the rostrum over a stridulatory sulcus under its head (stridulation), another reaction either to disturbance or a rejection during mating.

=== Epidemiology ===
Domestic and sylvatic species can carry the Chagas parasite to humans and wild mammals; birds are immune to the parasite. T. cruzi transmission is carried mainly from human to human by domestic kissing bugs; from the vertebrate to the bug by blood, and from the bug to the vertebrate by the insect's feces, and not by its saliva as occurs in most bloodsucking arthropod vectors such as malaria mosquitoes.

Triatomine infestation especially affects older dwellings. One can recognize the presence of triatomines in a house by its feces, exuviae, eggs, and adults. Triatomines characteristically leave two kinds of feces like strikes on walls of infected houses; one is white with uric acid, and the other is dark (black) containing heme. Whitish or pinkish eggs can be seen in wall crevices.

== Controlling triatomine infestations ==
=== Insecticide treatment ===
Synthetic pyrethroids are the main class of insecticides used to control triatominae infestations. Insecticide treatment is more effective on nonporous surfaces, such as hardwood timber, fired bricks, and plastered walls, than on porous surfaces such as mud. A single treatment with insecticide typically protects against triatomine infestation for a year or more on timber walls vs. 2–3 months on adobe walls. Wettable powders, suspension concentrates, and insecticide paints can improve treatment effectiveness on porous surfaces.

Rates of insecticide resistance among triatomines are fairly low due to their long life cycle and low genetic variability, but some instances of resistance have been reported, particularly among Triatoma infestans populations in Bolivia and Argentina.

== Tribes, genera, and numbers of described species ==
The monophyly of Triatominae is strongly supported by molecular data, indicating that hematophagy has evolved only once within the Reduviidae. The classification within the subfamily is not stable, with different proposed relationships among the tribes and genera. The classification below largely follows Galvão et al. 2003, but in a 2009 study this same author eliminated the tribe Linshcosteini and also eliminated the genera Meccus, Mepraia, and Nesotriatoma.

Alberproseniini (monotypic)
- Alberprosenia (2 spp.)

Bolboderini

- Belminus (9 spp.)
- Bolbodera (monotypic)
- Microtriatoma (2 spp.)
- Parabelminus (2 spp.)

Cavernicolini (monotypic)

- Cavernicola (2 spp.)

Linshcosteini (monotypic)

- Linshcosteus (6 spp.)

Rhodniini

- Psammolestes (3 spp.)
- Rhodnius (16 spp.)

Triatomini

- Dipetalogaster (monotypic)
- Eratyrus (2 spp.)
- Hermanlentia (monotypic)
- Meccus (6 spp.)
- Mepraia (2 spp.)
- Nesotriatoma (3 spp.)
- Panstrongylus (13 spp.)
- Paratriatoma (monotypic)
- Triatoma (67 spp.)

In addition, at least three fossil species have been described from amber deposits, one in Myanmar and two in the Dominican Republic:

- †Triatoma dominicana, Dominican amber, Dominican Republic. The amber pieces were found in Late Eocene to Early Miocene deposits.
- †Paleotriatoma metaxytaxa, Burmese amber, Myanmar, Late Cretaceous (Cenomanian)
- †Panstrongylus hispaniolae

=== Most important vectors ===
All 138 triatomine species are potentially able to transmit T. cruzi to humans, but these five species are the most epidemiologically important vectors of Chagas disease:

- Triatoma infestans
- Rhodnius prolixus
- Triatoma dimidiata
- Triatoma brasiliensis
- Panstrongylus megistus

== See also ==
- Hematophagy
