= Chagas disease =

Mammal parasitic disease

- Other names: American trypanosomiasis
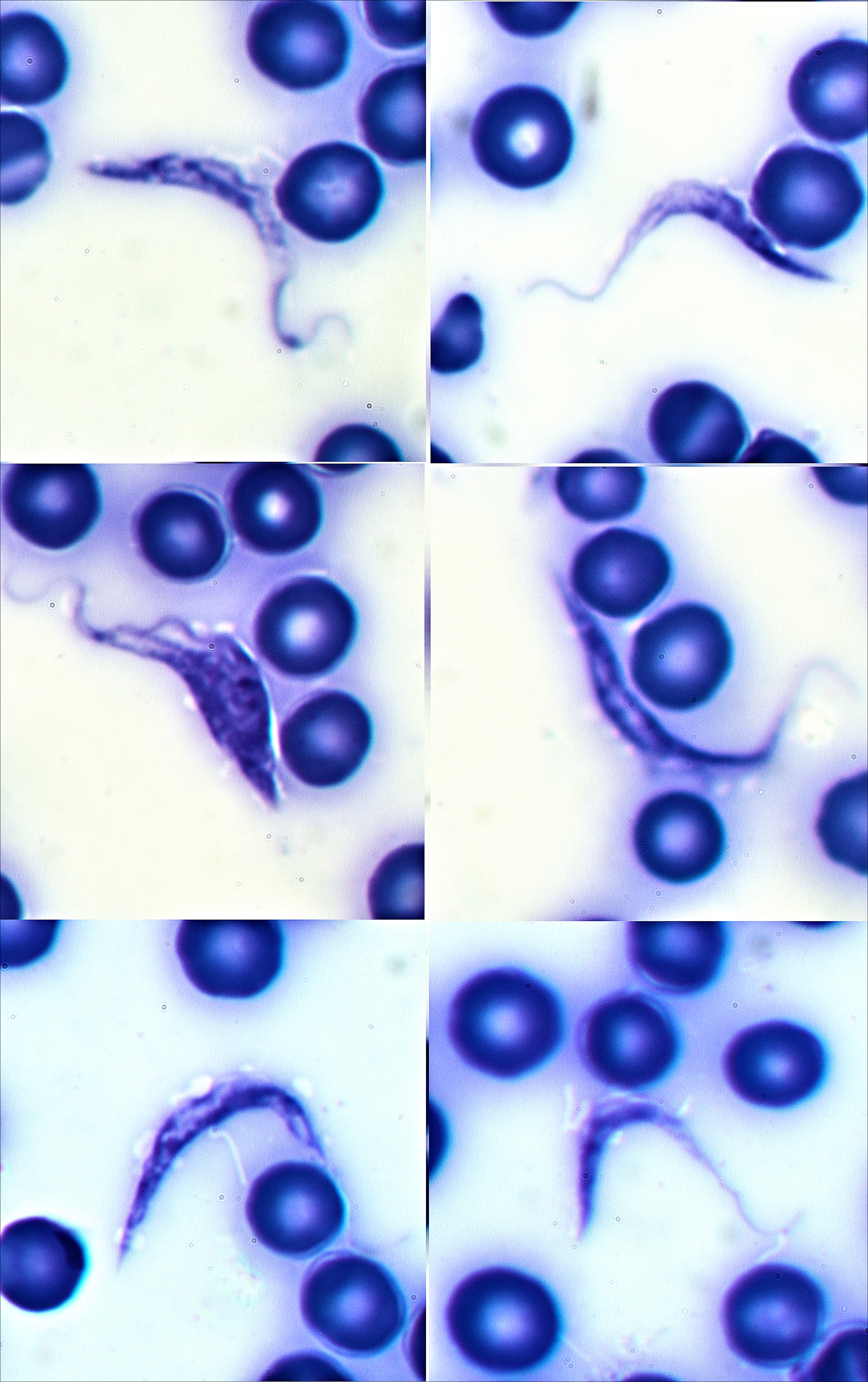
- Photomicrograph of Giemsa-stained Trypanosoma cruzi trypomastigotes in human blood
- Pronunciation: /ˈtʃɑːɡəs/, Portuguese pronunciation: [ˈʃaɡɐs]
- Specialty: Infectious disease
- Symptoms: Fever, large lymph nodes, headache
- Complications: Heart failure, enlarged esophagus, enlarged colon
- Causes: Trypanosoma cruzi spread by kissing bugs
- Diagnostic method: Finding the parasite, its DNA, or antibodies in the blood
- Prevention: Eliminating kissing bugs and avoiding their bites
- Medication: Benznidazole, nifurtimox
- Frequency: 6.5 million (2019)
- Deaths: 9,490 (2019)

Chagas disease, also known as American trypanosomiasis, is a tropical parasitic disease caused by Trypanosoma cruzi. It is spread mostly by insects in the subfamily Triatominae, known as "kissing bugs". The symptoms change throughout the infection. In the early stage, symptoms are typically either not present or mild and may include fever, swollen lymph nodes, headaches, or swelling at the site of the bite. After four to eight weeks, untreated individuals enter the chronic phase of disease, which in most cases does not result in further symptoms. Up to 45% of people with chronic infections develop heart disease 10–30 years after the initial illness, which can lead to heart failure. Digestive complications, including an enlarged esophagus or an enlarged colon, may also occur in up to 21% of people, and up to 10% of people may experience nerve damage.

T. cruzi is commonly spread to humans and other mammals by the kissing bug's bite wound and infected feces. The disease may also be spread through blood transfusion, organ transplantation, consuming food or drink contaminated with the parasites, and vertical transmission (from a mother to her baby). Diagnosis of early disease is by finding the parasite in the blood using a microscope or detecting its DNA by polymerase chain reaction. Chronic disease is diagnosed by finding antibodies for T. cruzi in the blood.

Prevention focuses on eliminating kissing bugs and avoiding their bites. This may involve the use of insecticides or bed-nets. Other preventive efforts include screening blood used for transfusions. Early infections are treatable with the medications benznidazole or nifurtimox, which usually cure the disease if given shortly after the person is infected, but become less effective the longer a person has had Chagas disease. When used in chronic disease, medication may delay or prevent the development of end-stage symptoms. Benznidazole and nifurtimox often cause side effects, including skin disorders, digestive system irritation, and neurological symptoms, which can result in treatment being discontinued. New drugs for Chagas disease are under development, and while experimental vaccines have been studied in animal models, a human vaccine has not been developed.

It is estimated that 6.5 million people, mostly in Mexico, Central America and South America, have Chagas disease as of 2019, resulting in approximately 9,490 annual deaths. Most people with the disease are poor, and most do not realize they are infected. Large-scale population migrations have carried Chagas disease to new regions, which include the United States and many European countries. The disease affects more than 150 types of animals. From 2000–2018, 29 confirmed locally-acquired cases of Chagas disease were reported in eight US states, leading to calls to reclassify Chagas as endemic to the US.

The disease was first described in 1909 by Brazilian physician Carlos Chagas, after whom it is named. Chagas disease is classified as a neglected tropical disease.

== Signs and symptoms ==
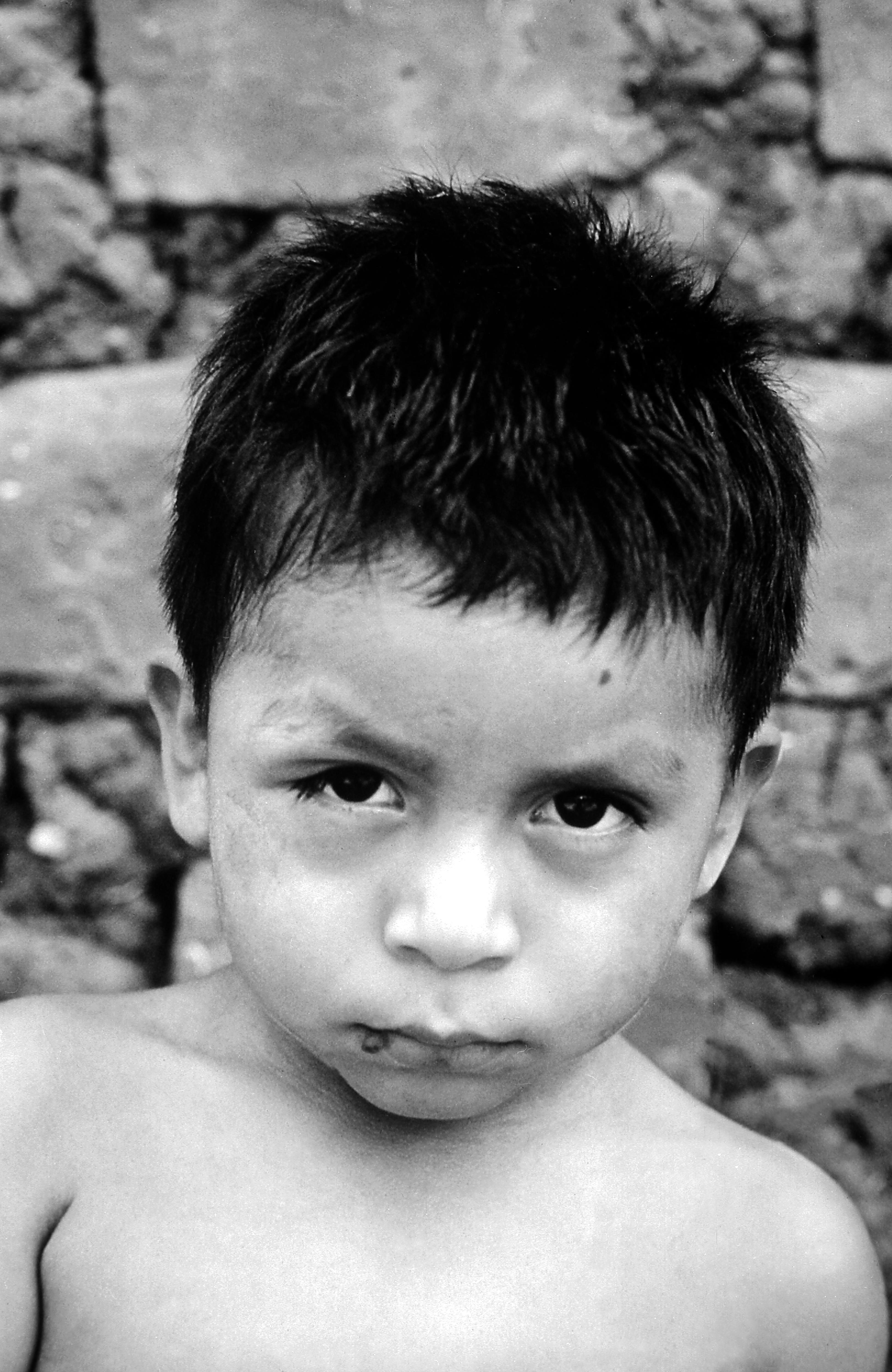
An acute Chagas disease infection with swelling of the right eye (Romaña's sign)

Chagas disease occurs in two stages: an acute stage, which develops one to two weeks after the insect bite, and a chronic stage, which develops over many years. The acute stage is often symptom-free. When present, the symptoms are typically minor and not specific to any particular disease. Signs and symptoms include fever, malaise, headache, and enlargement of the liver, spleen, and lymph nodes. Sometimes, people develop a swollen nodule at the site of infection, which is called "Romaña's sign" if it is on the eyelid, or a "chagoma" if it is elsewhere on the skin. In rare cases (less than 1–5%), infected individuals develop severe acute disease, which can involve inflammation of the heart muscle, fluid accumulation around the heart, and inflammation of the brain and surrounding tissues, and may be life-threatening. The acute phase typically lasts four to eight weeks and resolves without treatment.

Unless treated with antiparasitic drugs, individuals remain infected with T. cruzi after recovering from the acute phase. Most chronic infections are asymptomatic, which is referred to as indeterminate chronic Chagas disease. However, over decades with the disease, approximately 30–40% of people develop organ dysfunction (determinate chronic Chagas disease), which most often affects the heart or digestive system.

The most common long-term manifestation is heart disease, which occurs in 14–45% of people with chronic Chagas disease. People with Chagas heart disease often experience heart palpitations, and sometimes fainting, due to irregular heart function. By electrocardiogram, people with Chagas heart disease most frequently have arrhythmias. As the disease progresses, the heart's ventricles become enlarged (dilated cardiomyopathy), which reduces its ability to pump blood. In many cases, the first sign of Chagas heart disease is heart failure, thromboembolism, or chest pain associated with abnormalities in the microvasculature.

Also common in chronic Chagas disease is damage to the digestive system, which affects 10–21% of people. Enlargement of the esophagus or colon are the most common digestive issues. Those with enlarged esophagus often experience pain (odynophagia) or trouble swallowing (dysphagia), acid reflux, cough, and weight loss. Individuals with enlarged colon often experience constipation, and may develop severe blockage of the intestine or its blood supply. Up to 10% of chronically infected individuals develop nerve damage that can result in numbness and altered reflexes or movement. While chronic disease typically develops over decades, some individuals with Chagas disease (less than 10%) progress to heart damage directly after acute disease.

Signs and symptoms differ for people infected with T. cruzi through less common routes. People infected through ingestion of parasites tend to develop severe disease within three weeks of consumption, with symptoms including fever, vomiting, shortness of breath, cough, and pain in the chest, abdomen, and muscles. Those infected congenitally typically have few to no symptoms, but can have mild non-specific symptoms, or severe symptoms such as jaundice, respiratory distress, and heart problems. People infected through organ transplant or blood transfusion tend to have symptoms similar to those of vector-borne disease, but the symptoms may not manifest for anywhere from a week to five months. Chronically infected individuals who become immunosuppressed due to HIV infection can have particularly severe and distinct disease, most commonly characterized by inflammation in the brain and surrounding tissue or brain abscesses. Symptoms vary widely based on the size and location of brain abscesses, but typically include fever, headaches, seizures, loss of sensation, or other neurological issues that indicate particular sites of nervous system damage. Occasionally, these individuals also experience acute heart inflammation, skin lesions, and disease of the stomach, intestine, or peritoneum.

== Cause ==
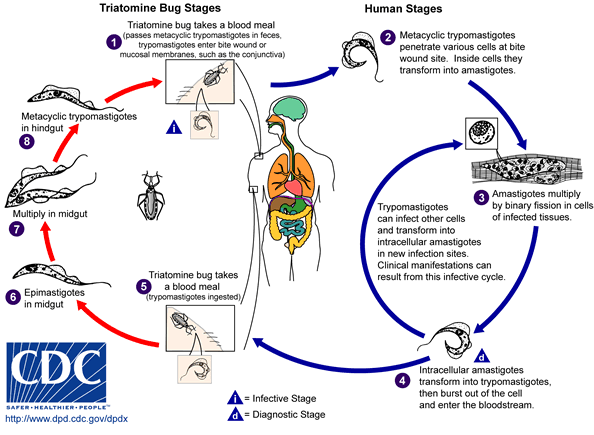
Life cycle and transmission of T. cruzi

Chagas disease is caused by infection with the protozoan parasite T. cruzi, which is typically introduced into humans through the bite of triatomine bugs, also called "kissing bugs". When the insect defecates at the bite site, motile T. cruzi forms called trypomastigotes enter the bloodstream and invade various host cells. Inside a host cell, the parasite transforms into a replicative form called an amastigote, which undergoes several rounds of replication. The replicated amastigotes transform back into trypomastigotes, which burst the host cell and are released into the bloodstream. Trypomastigotes then disseminate throughout the body to various tissues, where they invade cells and replicate. Over many years, cycles of parasite replication and immune response can severely damage these tissues, particularly the heart and digestive tract.

=== Transmission ===
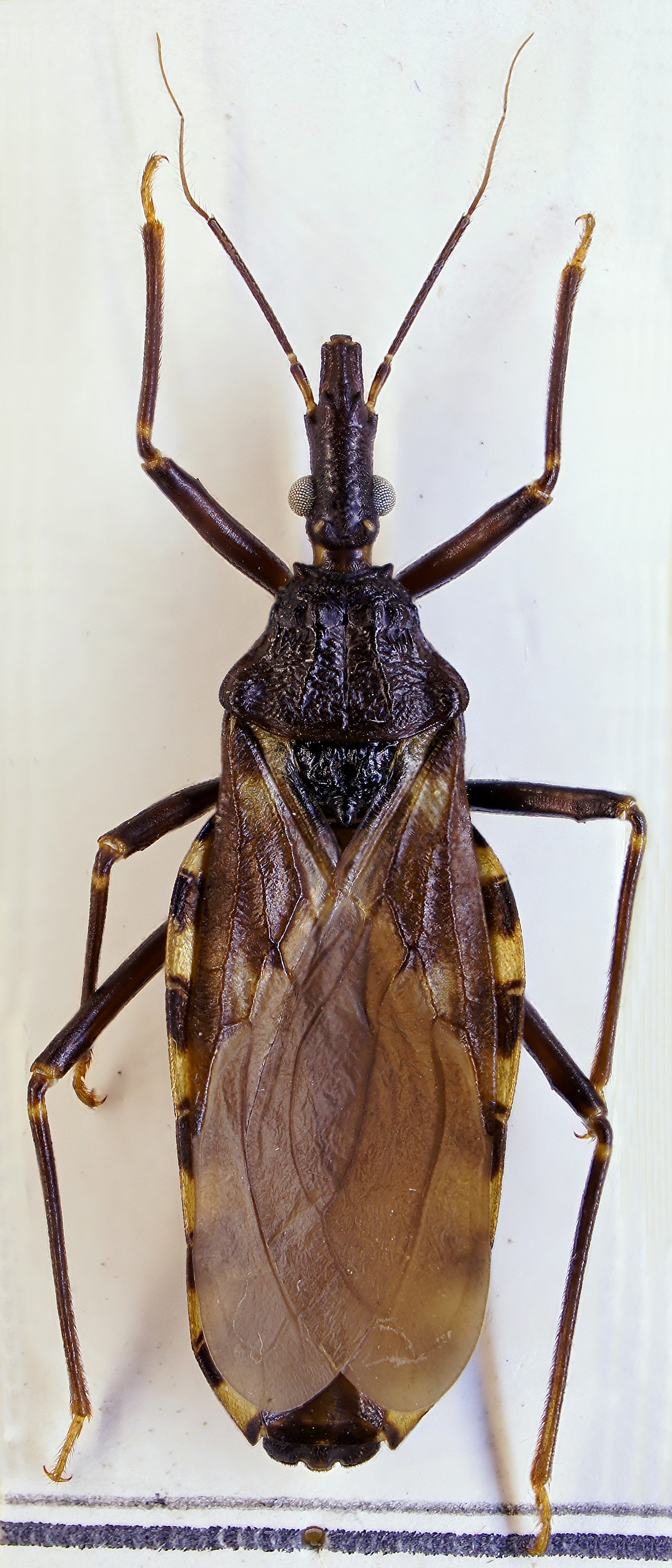
Triatoma infestans, a common vector of T. cruzi

T. cruzi can be transmitted by various triatomine bugs in the genera Triatoma, Panstrongylus, and Rhodnius. The primary vectors for human infection are the species of triatomine bugs that inhabit human dwellings, namely Triatoma infestans, Rhodnius prolixus, Triatoma dimidiata and Panstrongylus megistus. These insects are known by a number of local names, including vinchuca in Argentina, Bolivia, Chile and Paraguay, barbeiro (the barber) in Brazil, pito in Colombia, chinche in Central America, and chipo in Venezuela. The bugs tend to feed at night, preferring moist surfaces near the eyes or mouth. A triatomine bug can become infected with T. cruzi when it feeds on an infected host. T. cruzi replicates in the insect's intestinal tract and is shed in the bug's feces. When an infected triatomine feeds, it pierces the skin and takes in a blood meal, defecating at the same time to make room for the new meal. The bite is typically painless, but causes itching. Scratching at the bite introduces the T. cruzi-laden feces into the bite wound, initiating infection.

In addition to classical vector spread, Chagas disease can be transmitted through the consumption of food or drink contaminated with triatomine insects or their feces. Since heating or drying kills the parasites, drinks and especially fruit juices are the most frequent source of infection. This oral route of transmission has been implicated in several outbreaks, where it led to unusually severe symptoms, likely due to infection with a higher parasite load than from the bite of a triatomine bug—a single crushed triatomine in a food or beverage harboring T cruzi can contain about 600,000 metacyclic trypomastigotes, while triatomine fecal matter contains 3,000-4,000 per μL.

T. cruzi can be transmitted independently of the triatomine bug during blood transfusion, following organ transplantation, or across the placenta during pregnancy. Transfusion with the blood of an infected donor infects the recipient 10–25% of the time. To prevent this, blood donations are screened for T. cruzi in many countries with endemic Chagas disease, as well as the United States. Similarly, transplantation of solid organs from an infected donor can transmit T. cruzi to the recipient. This is especially true for heart transplant, which transmits T. cruzi 75–100% of the time, and less so for transplantation of the liver (0–29%) or a kidney (0–19%). An infected mother can pass T. cruzi to her child through the placenta; this occurs in up to 15% of births by infected mothers. As of 2019, 22.5% of new infections occurred through congenital transmission.

== Pathophysiology ==
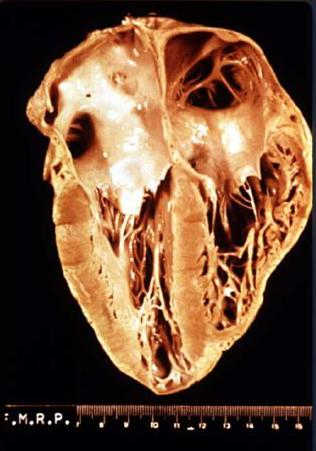
Large scale anatomy of a heart damaged by chronic Chagas disease

In the acute phase of the disease, signs and symptoms are caused directly by the replication of T. cruzi and the immune system's response to it. During this phase, T. cruzi can be found in various tissues throughout the body and circulating in the blood. During the initial weeks of infection, parasite replication is brought under control by the production of antibodies and activation of the host's inflammatory response, particularly cells that target intracellular pathogens such as NK cells and macrophages, driven by inflammation-signaling molecules like TNF-α and IFN-γ.

During chronic Chagas disease, long-term organ damage develops over the years due to continued replication of the parasite and damage from the immune system. Early in the course of the disease, T. cruzi is found frequently in the striated muscle fibers of the heart. As disease progresses, the heart becomes generally enlarged, with substantial regions of cardiac muscle fiber replaced by scar tissue and fat. Areas of active inflammation are scattered throughout the heart, with each housing inflammatory immune cells, typically macrophages and T cells. Late in the disease, parasites are rarely detected in the heart, and may be present at only very low levels.

In the heart, colon, and esophagus, chronic disease leads to a massive loss of nerve endings. In the heart, this may contribute to arrhythmias and other cardiac dysfunction. In the colon and esophagus, loss of nervous system control is the major driver of organ dysfunction. Loss of nerves impairs the movement of food through the digestive tract, which can lead to blockage of the esophagus or colon and restriction of their blood supply.

The parasite can insert kinetoplast DNA into host cells, an example of horizontal gene transfer. Vertical inheritance of the inserted kDNA has been demonstrated in rabbits and birds. In chickens, offspring carrying inserted kDNA show symptoms of disease despite carrying no live trypanosomes. In 2010, integrated kDNA was found to be vertically transmitted in five human families.

== Diagnosis ==
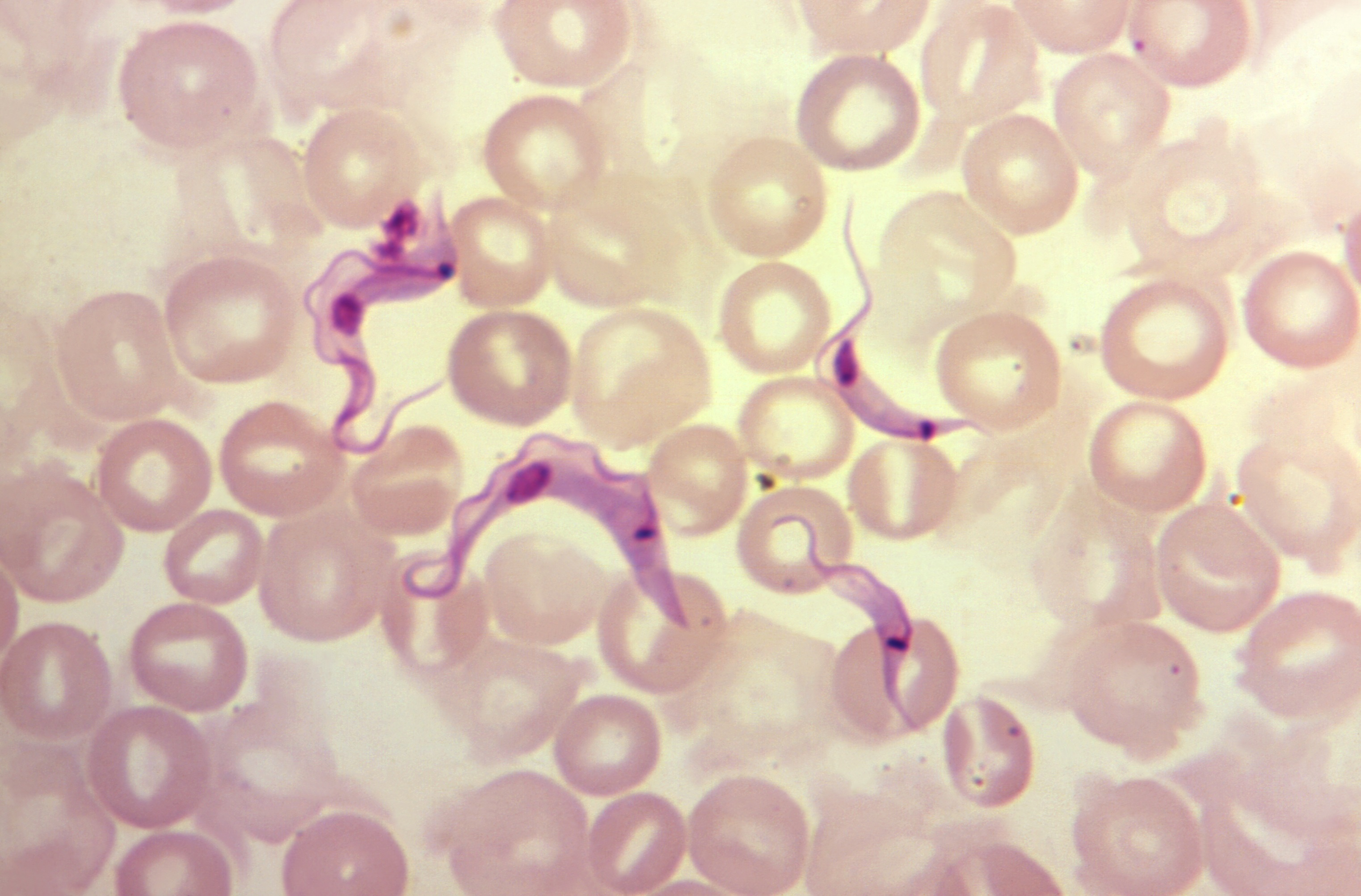
T. cruzi trypomastigotes seen in a blood smear

The presence of T. cruzi in the blood is diagnostic of Chagas disease. During the acute phase of infection, it can be detected by microscopic examination of fresh anticoagulated blood, or its buffy coat, for motile parasites; or by preparation of thin and thick blood smears stained with Giemsa, for direct visualization of parasites. Blood smear examination detects parasites in 34–85% of cases. The sensitivity increases if techniques such as microhematocrit centrifugation are used to concentrate the blood. On microscopic examination of stained blood smears, T. cruzi trypomastigotes appear as S or U-shaped organisms with a flagellum connected to the body by an undulating membrane. A nucleus and a smaller structure called a kinetoplast are visible inside the parasite's body; the kinetoplast of T. cruzi is relatively large, which helps to distinguish it from other species of trypanosomes that infect humans.

Alternatively, T. cruzi DNA can be detected by polymerase chain reaction (PCR). In acute and congenital Chagas disease, PCR is more sensitive than microscopy, and it is more reliable than antibody-based tests for the diagnosis of congenital disease because it is not affected by the transfer of antibodies against T. cruzi from a mother to her baby (passive immunity). PCR is also used to monitor T. cruzi levels in organ transplant recipients and immunosuppressed people, which allows infection or reactivation to be detected at an early stage.

In chronic Chagas disease, the concentration of parasites in the blood is too low to be reliably detected by microscopy or PCR, so the diagnosis is usually made using serological tests, which detect immunoglobulin G antibodies against T. cruzi in the blood. Two positive serology results, using different test methods, are required to confirm the diagnosis. If the test results are inconclusive, additional testing methods such as Western blot can be used.

Various rapid diagnostic tests for Chagas disease are available. These tests are easily transported and can be performed by people without special training. They are useful for screening large numbers of people and testing people who cannot access healthcare facilities, but their sensitivity is relatively low, and it is recommended that a second method is used to confirm a positive result.

T. cruzi parasites can be grown from blood samples by blood culture, xenodiagnosis, or by inoculating animals with the person's blood. In the blood culture method, the person's red blood cells are separated from the plasma and added to a specialized growth medium to encourage multiplication of the parasite. It can take up to six months to obtain the result. Xenodiagnosis involves feeding the blood to triatomine insects, and then examining their feces for the parasite 30 to 60 days later. These methods are not routinely used, as they are slow and have low sensitivity.

== Prevention ==
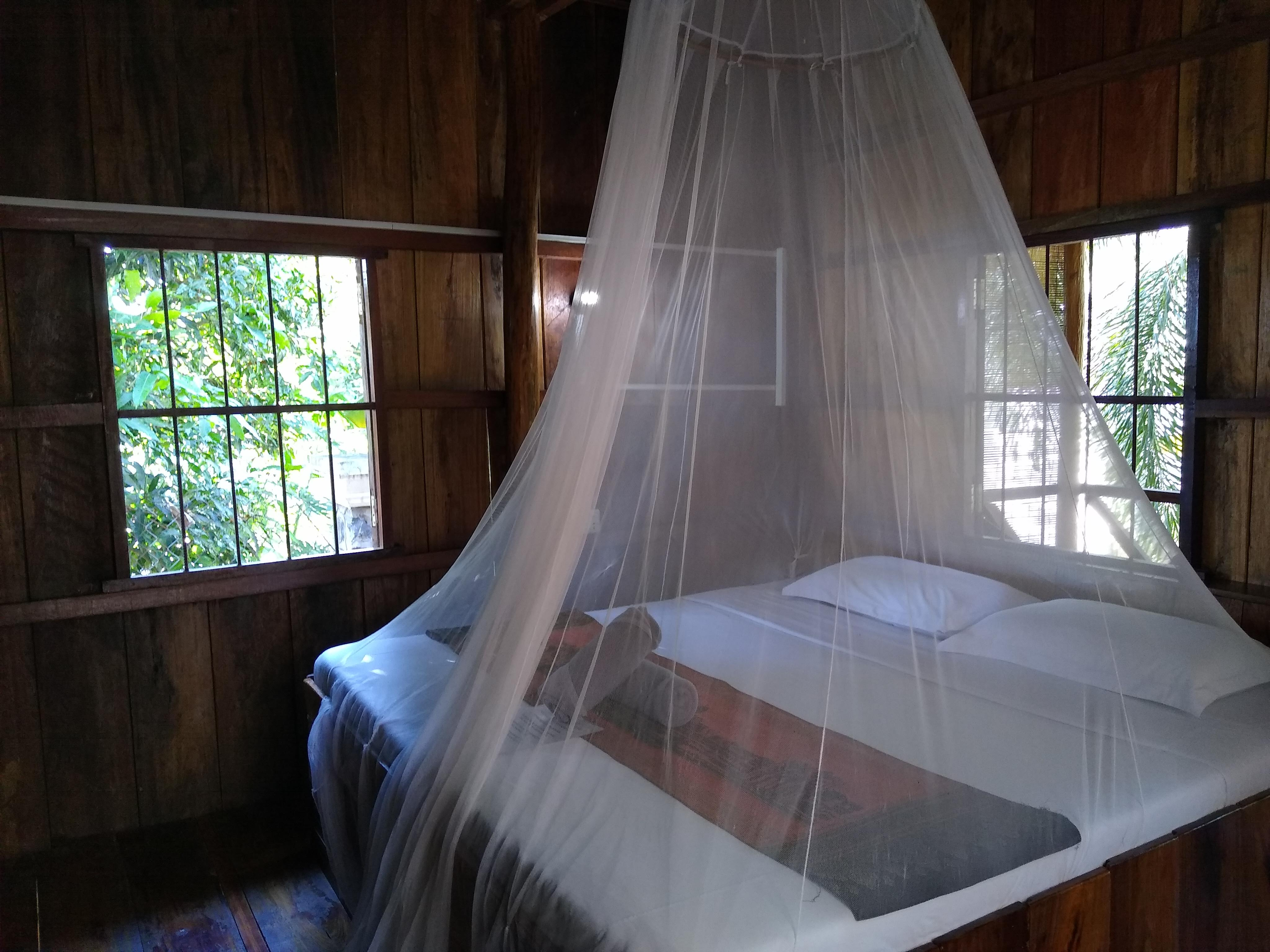
Bed nets can be used in endemic areas to prevent bites from triatomine bugs.

Efforts to prevent Chagas disease have largely focused on vector control to limit exposure to triatomine bugs. Insecticide-spraying programs have been the mainstay of vector control, consisting of spraying homes and the surrounding areas with residual insecticides. This was originally done with organochlorine, organophosphate, and carbamate insecticides, which were supplanted in the 1980s with pyrethroids. These programs have drastically reduced transmission in Brazil and Chile, and eliminated major vectors from certain regions: Triatoma infestans from Brazil, Chile, Uruguay, and parts of Peru and Paraguay, as well as Rhodnius prolixus from Central America. Vector control in some regions has been hindered by the development of insecticide resistance among triatomine bugs. In response, vector control programs have implemented alternative insecticides (e.g. fenitrothion and bendiocarb in Argentina and Bolivia), xenointoxication treatment of domesticated animals (which are also fed on by triatomine bugs) with pesticides, pesticide-impregnated paints, and other experimental approaches. In areas with triatomine bugs, transmission of T. cruzi can be prevented by sleeping under bed nets and by housing improvements that prevent triatomine bugs from colonizing houses.

Blood transfusion was formerly the second-most common mode of transmission for Chagas disease. T. cruzi can survive in refrigerated stored blood, and can survive freezing and thawing, allowing it to persist in whole blood, packed red blood cells, granulocytes, cryoprecipitate, and platelets. The development and implementation of blood bank screening tests have dramatically reduced the risk of infection during a blood transfusion. Nearly all blood donations in Latin American countries undergo Chagas screening. Widespread screening is also common in non-endemic nations with significant populations of immigrants from endemic areas, including the United Kingdom (implemented in 1999), Spain (2005), the United States (2007), France and Sweden (2009), Switzerland (2012), and Belgium (2013). Serological tests, typically ELISAs, are used to detect antibodies against T. cruzi proteins in donor blood.

Other modes of transmission have been targeted by Chagas disease prevention programs. Treating T. cruzi-infected mothers during pregnancy reduces the risk of congenital transmission of the infection. To this end, many countries in Latin America have implemented routine screening of pregnant women and infants for T. cruzi infection, and the World Health Organization recommends screening all children born to infected mothers to prevent congenital infection from developing into chronic disease. Similarly to blood transfusions, many countries with endemic Chagas disease screen organs for transplantation with serological tests.

There is no vaccine against Chagas disease. Several experimental vaccines have been tested in animals infected with T. cruzi and were able to reduce parasite numbers in the blood and heart, but no vaccine candidates had undergone clinical trials in humans as of 2016.

== Management ==
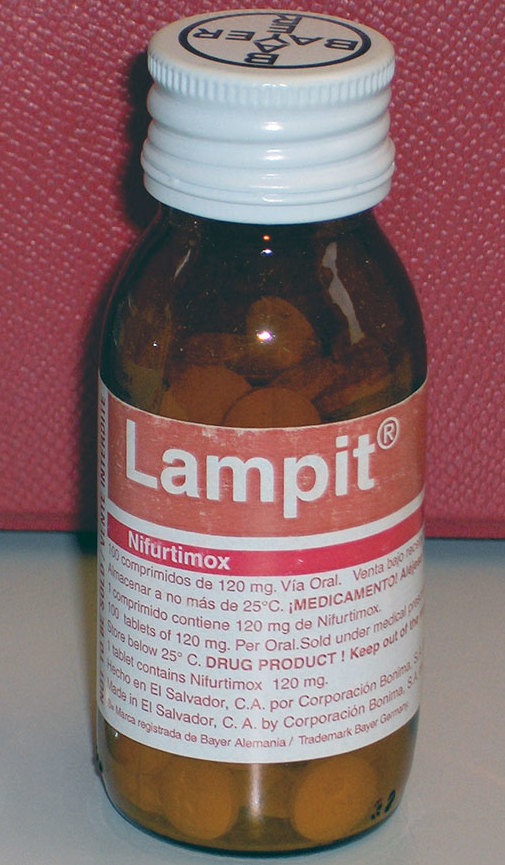
A bottle of nifurtimox tablets

Chagas disease is managed using antiparasitic drugs to eliminate T. cruzi from the body, and symptomatic treatment to address the effects of the infection. As of 2018, benznidazole and nifurtimox were the antiparasitic drugs of choice for treating Chagas disease, though benznidazole is the only drug available in most of Latin America. For either drug, treatment typically consists of two to three oral doses per day for 60 to 90 days. Antiparasitic treatment is most effective early in the course of infection: it eliminates T. cruzi from 50 to 80% of people in the acute phase (WHO: "nearly 100 %"), but only 20–60% of those in the chronic phase. Treatment of chronic disease is more effective in children than in adults, and the cure rate for congenital disease approaches 100% if treated in the first year of life. Antiparasitic treatment can also slow the progression of the disease and reduce the possibility of congenital transmission. Elimination of T. cruzi does not cure the cardiac and gastrointestinal damage caused by chronic Chagas disease, so these conditions must be treated separately. Antiparasitic treatment is not recommended for people who have already developed dilated cardiomyopathy.

Benznidazole is usually considered the first-line treatment because it has milder adverse effects than nifurtimox, and its efficacy is better understood. Both benznidazole and nifurtimox have common side effects that can result in treatment being discontinued. The most common side effects of benznidazole are skin rash, digestive problems, decreased appetite, weakness, headache, and sleeping problems. These side effects can sometimes be treated with antihistamines or corticosteroids, and are generally reversed when treatment is stopped. However, benznidazole is discontinued in up to 29% of cases. Nifurtimox has more frequent side effects, affecting up to 97.5% of individuals taking the drug. The most common side effects are loss of appetite, weight loss, nausea and vomiting, and various neurological disorders including mood changes, insomnia, paresthesia and peripheral neuropathy. Treatment is discontinued in up to 75% of cases. Both drugs are contraindicated for use in pregnant women and people with liver or kidney failure. As of 2019, resistance to these drugs has been reported.

=== Complications ===
In the chronic stage, treatment involves managing the clinical manifestations of the disease. The treatment of Chagas cardiomyopathy is similar to that of other forms of heart disease. Beta blockers and ACE inhibitors may be prescribed, but some people with Chagas disease may not be able to take the standard dose of these drugs because they have low blood pressure or a low heart rate. To manage irregular heartbeats, people may be prescribed anti-arrhythmic drugs such as amiodarone, or have a pacemaker implanted. Blood thinners may be used to prevent thromboembolism and stroke. Chronic heart disease caused by untreated T. cruzi infection is a common reason for heart transplantation surgery. Because transplant recipients take immunosuppressive drugs to prevent organ rejection, they are monitored using PCR to detect reactivation of the disease. People with Chagas disease who undergo heart transplantation have higher survival rates than the average heart transplant recipient.

Mild gastrointestinal disease may be treated symptomatically, such as by using laxatives for constipation or taking a prokinetic drug like metoclopramide before meals to relieve esophageal symptoms. Surgery to sever the muscles of the lower esophageal sphincter (cardiomyotomy) may be performed in more severe cases of esophageal disease, and surgical removal of the affected part of the organ may be required for advanced megacolon and megaesophagus.

== Epidemiology ==
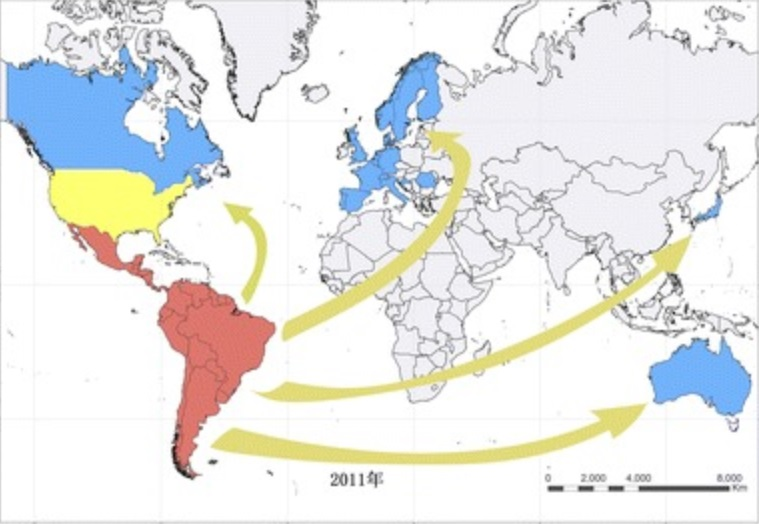
Epidemiology of Chagas disease circa 2011: red is endemic countries where spread is through vectors; yellow is endemic countries where spread is occasionally through vectors; blue is non-endemic countries where spread is through blood transfusions and migration.

Disability-adjusted life years due to Chagas disease in 2016. Grey indicates no data. Otherwise, colors get increasingly dark red for each order of magnitude increase in DALY burden: 0, white. Up to 1,000 DALYs, yellow. 1,001 to 10,000 DALYs, orange. 10,001 to 100,000 DALYs, light red. Greater than 100,000 DALYs, dark red.

In 2019, an estimated 6.5 million people worldwide had Chagas disease, with approximately 173,000 new infections and 9,490 deaths each year. The disease resulted in a global annual economic burden estimated at US$7.2 billion in 2013, 86% of which is borne by endemic countries. Chagas disease results in the loss of over 800,000 disability-adjusted life years each year.

The endemic area of Chagas disease stretches from the southern United States to northern Chile and Argentina, with Bolivia (6.1%), Argentina (3.6%), and Paraguay (2.1%) exhibiting the highest prevalence of the disease. Within continental Latin America, Chagas disease is endemic to 21 countries: Argentina, Belize, Bolivia, Brazil, Chile, Colombia, Costa Rica, Ecuador, El Salvador, French Guiana, Guatemala, Guyana, Honduras, Mexico, Nicaragua, Panama, Paraguay, Peru, Suriname, Uruguay, and Venezuela. In endemic areas, due largely to vector control efforts and screening of blood donations, annual infections and deaths have fallen by 67% and more than 73% respectively from their peaks in the 1980s to 2010. Transmission by insect vector and blood transfusion has been completely interrupted in Uruguay (1997), Chile (1999), and Brazil (2006), and in Argentina, vectorial transmission had been interrupted in 13 of the 19 endemic provinces as of 2001. During Venezuela's humanitarian crisis, vectorial transmission has begun occurring in areas where it had previously been interrupted, and Chagas disease seroprevalence rates have increased. Transmission rates have also risen in the Gran Chaco region due to insecticide resistance and in the Amazon basin due to oral transmission.

While the rate of vector-transmitted Chagas disease has declined throughout most of Latin America, the rate of orally transmitted disease has risen, possibly due to increasing urbanization and deforestation bringing people into closer contact with triatomines and altering the distribution of triatomine species. Orally transmitted Chagas disease is of particular concern in Venezuela, where 16 outbreaks have been recorded between 2007 and 2018.

Chagas exists in two different ecological zones. In the Southern Cone region, the main vector lives in and around human homes. In Central America and Mexico, the main vector species lives both inside dwellings and in uninhabited areas. In both zones, Chagas occurs almost exclusively in rural areas, where T. cruzi also circulates in wild and domestic animals. T. cruzi commonly infects more than 100 species of mammals across Latin America including opossums (Didelphis spp.), armadillos, marmosets, bats, various rodents and dogs all of which can be infected by the vectors or orally by eating triatomine bugs and other infected animals. For entomophagous animals this is a common mode. Didelphis spp. are unique in that they do not require the triatomine for transmission, completing the life cycle through their own urine and feces. Veterinary transmission also occurs through vertical transmission through the placenta, blood transfusion and organ transplants.

As with other infectious diseases, climate change will have an effect on the distribution and the risk of transmission of Chagas disease. The specific effects vary, depending on the geographical region, disease-carrying species, the exact climate change scenario, and many other factors.

=== Non-endemic and hypoendemic countries ===
Though Chagas is traditionally considered a disease of rural Latin America, international migration has dispersed those with the disease to numerous non-endemic countries, primarily in North America and Europe. As of 2020, approximately 300,000 infected people are living in the United States, and in 2018 it was estimated that 30,000 to 40,000 people in the United States had Chagas cardiomyopathy. The vast majority of cases in the United States occur in immigrants from Latin America, but local transmission is possible. Eleven triatomine species are native to the United States, and some southern states have persistent cycles of disease transmission between insect vectors and animal reservoirs, which include woodrats, possums, raccoons, armadillos and skunks. However, locally acquired infection is very rare: only 28 cases were documented from 1955 to 2015. Taking into account the local reservoir and transmission to humans, some scientists have proposed reclassifying Chagas disease as endemic to the US, specifically "hypoendemic" to reflect the low transmission.

As of 2013, the cost of treatment in the United States was estimated to be US$900 million annually (global cost $7 billion), which included hospitalization and medical devices such as pacemakers.

Chagas disease affected approximately 68,000 to 123,000 people in Europe as of 2019. Spain, which has a high rate of immigration from Latin America, has the highest prevalence of the disease. It is estimated that 50,000 to 70,000 people in Spain are living with Chagas disease, accounting for the majority of European cases. The prevalence varies widely within European countries due to differing immigration patterns. Italy has the second highest prevalence, followed by the Netherlands, the United Kingdom, and Germany.

== History ==
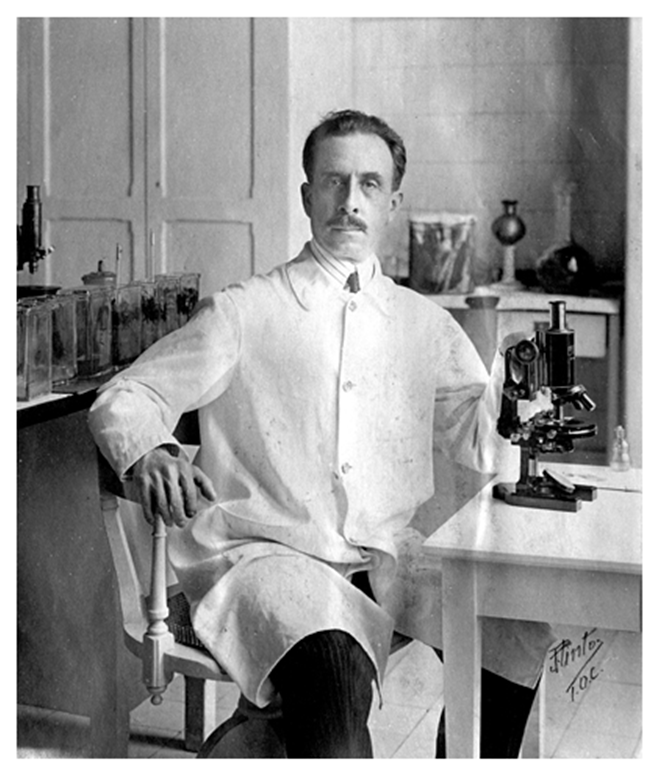
Carlos Chagas, in his laboratory at Instituto Oswaldo Cruz

T. cruzi likely circulated in South American mammals long before the arrival of humans on the continent. T. cruzi has been detected in ancient human remains across South America, from a 9000-year-old Chinchorro mummy in the Atacama Desert, to remains of various ages in Minas Gerais, to an 1100-year-old mummy as far north as the Chihuahuan Desert near the Rio Grande. Many early written accounts describe symptoms consistent with Chagas disease, with early descriptions of the disease sometimes attributed to Miguel Diaz Pimenta (1707), Luís Gomes Ferreira (1735), and Theodoro J. H. Langgaard (1842).

The formal description of Chagas disease was made by Carlos Chagas in 1909 after examining a two-year-old girl with fever, swollen lymph nodes, and an enlarged spleen and liver. Upon examination of her blood, Chagas saw trypanosomes identical to those he had recently identified from the hindgut of triatomine bugs and named Trypanosoma cruzi in honor of his mentor, Brazilian physician Oswaldo Cruz. He sent infected triatomine bugs to Cruz in Rio de Janeiro, who showed the bite of the infected triatomine could transmit T. cruzi to marmoset monkeys as well. In just two years, 1908 and 1909, Chagas published descriptions of the disease, the organism that caused it, and the insect vector required for infection. Almost immediately thereafter, at the suggestion of Miguel Couto, then professor of the Faculdade de Medicina do Rio de Janeiro, the disease was widely referred to as "Chagas disease". Chagas' discovery brought him national and international renown, but in highlighting the inadequacies of the Brazilian government's response to the disease, Chagas attracted criticism to himself and to the disease that bore his name, stifling research on his discovery and likely frustrating his nomination for the Nobel Prize in 1921.

In the 1930s, Salvador Mazza rekindled Chagas disease research, describing over a thousand cases in Argentina's Chaco Province. In Argentina, the disease is known as mal de Chagas-Mazza in his honor. Serological tests for Chagas disease were introduced in the 1940s, demonstrating that infection with T. cruzi was widespread across Latin America. This, combined with successes eliminating the malaria vector through insecticide use, spurred the creation of public health campaigns focused on treating houses with insecticides to eradicate triatomine bugs. The 1950s saw the discovery that treating blood with crystal violet could eradicate the parasite, leading to its widespread use in transfusion screening programs in Latin America. Large-scale control programs began to take form in the 1960s, first in São Paulo, then various locations in Argentina, then national-level programs across Latin America. These programs received a major boost in the 1980s with the introduction of pyrethroid insecticides, which did not leave stains or odors after application and were longer-lasting and more cost-effective. Regional bodies dedicated to controlling Chagas disease arose through support of the Pan American Health Organization, with the Initiative of the Southern Cone for the Elimination of Chagas Diseases launching in 1991, followed by the Initiative of the Andean countries (1997), Initiative of the Central American countries (1997), and the Initiative of the Amazon countries (2004).

== Research ==
=== Treatments ===
Fexinidazole, an antiparasitic drug approved for treating African trypanosomiasis, has shown activity against Chagas disease in animal models. As of 2019, it is undergoing phase II clinical trials for chronic Chagas disease in Spain. Other drug candidates include GNF6702, a proteasome inhibitor that is effective against Chagas disease in mice and is undergoing preliminary toxicity studies, and AN4169, which has had promising results in animal models. More recently, has been tested AVN-944, an IMPDH inhibitor currently in Phase II clinical trials, has been shown to be active against Trypanosoma cruzi amastigotes in an in vitro cardiomyoblast infection model. Pointing out IMPDH as a novel target to treat Chagas disease.

Several experimental vaccines have been tested in animals. In addition to subunit vaccines, some approaches have involved vaccination with attenuated T. cruzi parasites or organisms that express some of the same antigens as T. cruzi but do not cause human disease, such as Trypanosoma rangeli or Phytomonas serpens. DNA vaccination has also been explored. As of 2019, vaccine research has mainly been limited to small animal models.

=== Diagnostic tests ===
As of 2018, standard diagnostic tests for Chagas disease were limited in their ability to measure the effectiveness of antiparasitic treatment, as serological tests may remain positive for years after T. cruzi is eliminated from the body, and PCR may give false-negative results when the parasite concentration in the blood is low. Several potential biomarkers of treatment response are under investigation, such as immunoassays against specific T. cruzi antigens, flow cytometry testing to detect antibodies against different life stages of T. cruzi, and markers of physiological changes caused by the parasite, such as alterations in coagulation and lipid metabolism.

Another research area is the use of biomarkers to predict the progression of chronic disease. Serum levels of tumor necrosis factor alpha, brain and atrial natriuretic peptide, and angiotensin-converting enzyme 2 have been studied as indicators of the prognosis of Chagas cardiomyopathy.

T. cruzi shed acute-phase antigen (SAPA), which can be detected in blood using ELISA or Western blot, has been used as an indicator of early acute and congenital infection. An assay for T. cruzi antigens in urine has been developed to diagnose congenital disease.

== See also ==
- Drugs for Neglected Diseases Initiative
- Chagas: Time to Treat campaign
