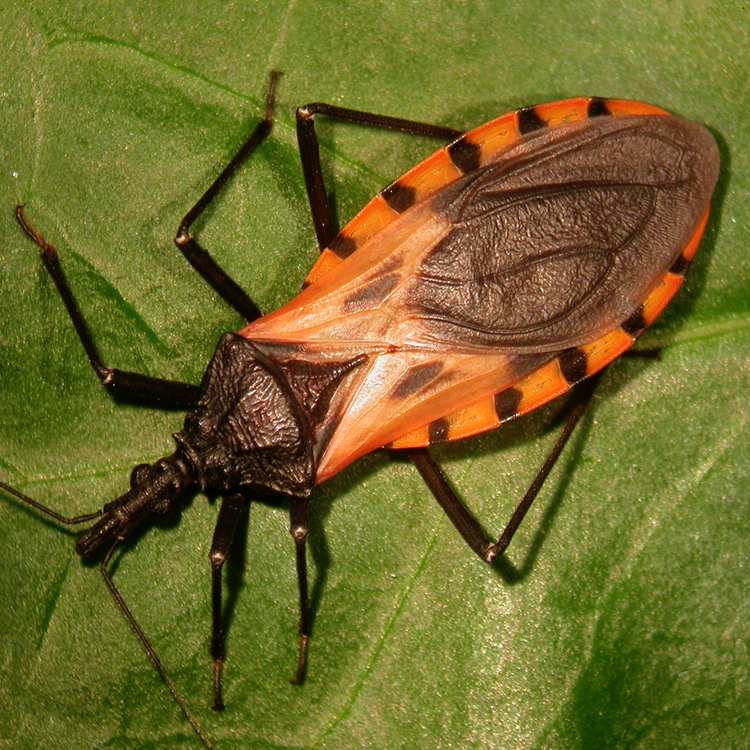

Scientific classification
- Kingdom: Animalia
- Phylum: Arthropoda
- Class: Insecta
- Order: Hemiptera
- Suborder: Heteroptera
- Family: Reduviidae
- Genus: Triatoma
- Species: T. dimidiata

Binomial name
- Triatoma dimidiata Latreille, 1811

= Triatoma dimidiata =

Species of true bug

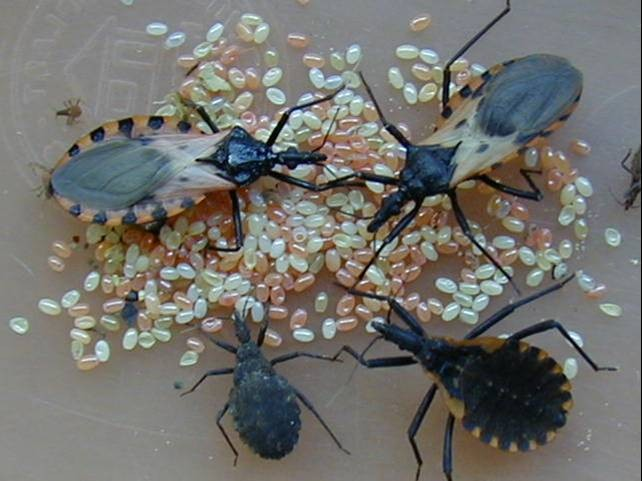
Different stages and eggs of T. dimidiata.

Triatoma dimidiata is a blood-sucking insect whose range extends from northern South America (Colombia, Venezuela, Ecuador, and Peru), throughout all the countries of Central America and into Southern Mexico. It is among the most important carriers of Trypanosoma cruzi, the flagellate protozoan that causes Chagas disease. Dimidiata has been found in rock piles, caves occupied by bats, hollow trees occupied by mammals or birds, and other diverse ecotopes. However, their presence in human abodes is usually happenstance; people tend to bring them indoors with their firewood. When in the nymph form they may camouflage themselves from predators by scraping dust over their dorsal abdomen, a behavior also observed in T. phyllosoma, T. nigromaculata, Panstrongylus geniculatus, P. megistus and P. herreri nymphs. Moreover, due to geological past in Mesoamerica such as forest loss and rising temperatures, there has been an increase in Triatomine bugs infestation.
