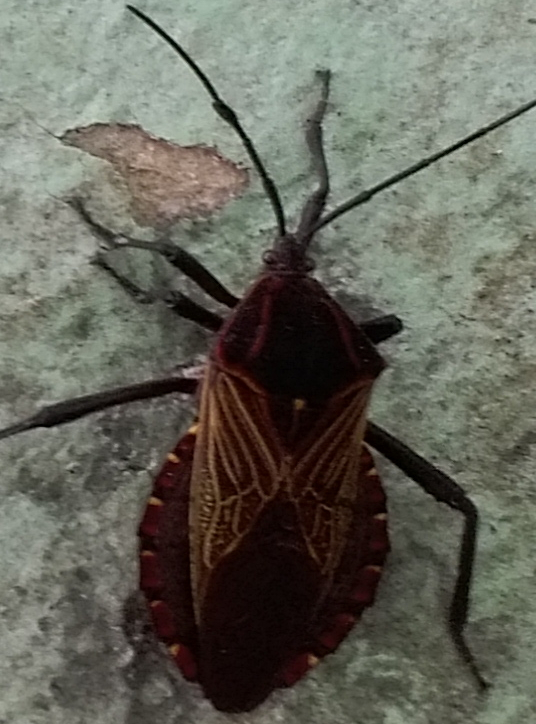

Scientific classification
- Kingdom: Animalia
- Phylum: Arthropoda
- Clade: Pancrustacea
- Class: Insecta
- Order: Hemiptera
- Suborder: Heteroptera
- Family: Reduviidae
- Genus: Triatoma
- Species: T. rubrovaria

Binomial name
- Triatoma rubrovaria (Blanchard in Blanchard and Brullé, 1843)

= Triatoma rubrovaria =

Species of true bug

Triatoma rubrovaria is a species of triatomine that is ubiquitous to Uruguay, neighboring parts of northeastern Argentina, and in the southern states of Paraná and Rio Grande do Sul in Brazil. It was earlier reported as T. (triatoma) rubrovaria, a sylvatic species believed to be a highly competent vector of Trypanosoma cruzi, the causative agent of Chagas disease.

== Habitat ==
They are commonly found among piles of exfoliate rocks known as pedregales and in various peridomestic environments. Though it is generally rare, the occurrence of domiciliary and peridomiciliary invasion of T. rubrovaria has become increasingly prevalent in Rio Grande do Sul, where it has become the most frequently captured triatomine species since the control of T. infestans.
