= Triatoma sherlocki =

Scientific classification
- Kingdom: Animalia
- Phylum: Arthropoda
- Clade: Pancrustacea
- Class: Insecta
- Order: Hemiptera
- Suborder: Heteroptera
- Family: Reduviidae
- Genus: Triatoma
- Species: T. sherlocki

Binomial name
- Triatoma sherlocki Papa, Jurberg, Carcavallo, Cerqueira & Barata, 2002

Species of insect

Triatoma sherlocki is a species of heteropteran insect in the family Reduviidae and subfamily Triatominae. Like other members of its subfamily, commonly known as "kissing bugs", it is a hematophagous insect of medical relevance as a potential vector of the protozoan Trypanosoma cruzi, the causative agent of Chagas disease.

== Taxonomy and discovery ==
The species was described in 2002. The primary research leading to the identification and description of Triatoma sherlocki was conducted by the Italian researcher Alberto Papa, associated with the School of Public Health of the University of São Paulo, in collaboration with scientists Jurberg, Carcavallo, Cerqueira, and Barata. The original description was published in the scientific journal Entomología y Vectores.

Phylogenetic studies based on mitochondrial gene analysis indicate that T. sherlocki is closely related to other endemic Brazilian species within the genus Triatoma, particularly positioning within the Triatoma brasiliensis species complex.

== Description ==
Morphologically, Triatoma sherlocki shares many characteristics with other triatomines, but presents a distinctive trait related to its wings. Unlike many related species, T. sherlocki is characterized by shorter wings that end before the seventh urotergite. This feature previously led researchers to hypothesize a reduced flight capacity, although laboratory observations have demonstrated that the species possesses mobility and dispersal capabilities.

== Distribution and habitat ==
Triatoma sherlocki is endemic to northeastern Brazil, particularly found in the state of Bahia. The specimens on which the original description was based were collected in the municipality of Gentio do Ouro.

The insect is typical of the Caatinga biome, a semiarid environment characterized by shrubby vegetation. Its natural ecotope consists of rocky outcrops, where it shelters inside fissures, cracks, and holes in exposed rocks, which provide protection from predators and favorable microclimates. It frequently shares these spaces with other triatomine species.

== Medical importance ==
Although originally a predominantly sylvatic species (associated with natural environments), Triatoma sherlocki poses public health concerns due to its susceptibility to infection by Trypanosoma cruzi.

It has been observed that the species has the capacity to invade and, in some cases, colonize peridomestic environments and human dwellings in search of blood meals. This anthropophilic behavior exposes local populations to the risk of contracting Chagas disease, making T. sherlocki a vector of epidemiological interest in rural areas of Bahia state.

== Etymology ==
The species is named after Dr. Ítalo Rodrigues de Araújo Sherlock, a doctor and entomologist, lead researcher at the Oswaldo Cruz Foundation at the Gonçalo Moniz Research Center (Salvador-BA), who has dedicated his life to studying the vectors of Leishmaniasis and Chagas Disease.

== Furher reading ==
- Almeida CE, Oliveira HL, Correia N, Dornak LL, Gumiel M, Neiva VL, et al. (2012). "Dispersion capacity of Triatoma sherlocki, Triatoma juazeirensis and laboratory-bred hybrids". Acta Tropica. 122 (1): 71–79. doi:10.1016/j.actatropica.2011.12.001. ISSN 0001-706X.
