= Triatoma indictiva =

Scientific classification
- Kingdom: Animalia
- Phylum: Arthropoda
- Class: Insecta
- Order: Hemiptera
- Suborder: Heteroptera
- Family: Reduviidae
- Genus: Triatoma
- Species: T. indictiva

Binomial name
- Triatoma indictiva Neiva, 1912

Species of true bug

Triatoma indictiva is an arthropod in the assassin bug family of Reduviidae, and is an important vector of Trypanosoma cruzi. T. cruzi is the protozoan that causes Chagas Disease, which affects approximately eight million people a year in the western hemisphere alone. Triatoma indictiva is found in Mexico and throughout the southern United States, including Arizona and Texas.

== Physical characteristics and development ==
Triatoma indictiva is between 20 and 30 millimetres (0.79 and 1.18 in) long when fully developed and can be identified taxonomically by their pear shape, tapered beak, observing the length of the scape and the red vestiges on its side. T. inductiva are paurometabolous and undergo 3 life stages including: egg, nymph and adult. The head and thorax of T. inductiva are black except for the red markings of its side and the slightly lighter colored third section of the leg. T. indictiva has a narrow head and tri-segmented antennae, with black forewings that cover the abdomen.

== Habitat ==
Triatoma indictiva are generally nidicolous (born immature) and are found in wooded areas or birds nests, but also can be found inside a house or other man-made structures. T. indictiva has been reported in Mexico, Arizona, and Texas. It is believed that T. indictiva is more commonly found in dwellings in Mexico and poorer regions, because it is easier for a colony to form in an open residence, bringing them more frequently into contact with people. Due to the fact that T. indictiva is established throughout much of Mexico, especially in areas with poor economic conditions, they are difficult to manage.

== Feeding ==
Triatoma indictiva are hematophagous (blood-sucking) and mainly feed on mammals, including humans, but they also feed on birds and reptiles. In their nymphal stages, T. indictiva can easily switch between vertebrate and invertebrate hosts, but the reasons that cause the switch is currently unknown. Adult T. indictiva, when feeding on humans bite around the lips or face, which is how the term "kissing bug" was formed. This is dangerous because, T. indictiva occasionally defecate during or after a blood meal, which can leave behind fecal matter containing T. cruzi.

== Vector of Chagas disease ==
T. indictiva is one of the main vectors of T. cruzi, the hemoflagellate protozoan that causes Chagas disease. T. cruzi is transmitted through infectious feces left by T. indictiva after a blood meal. T. cruzi then usually enters the vertebrate by contaminating the bite site or through a nearby mucous membrane. Enzootic infection is prevalent across the southern United States, where there are 24 reservoir species and triatomine vectors, including T. indictiva reported in 28 states. Only 7 autochthonous human cases of Chagas disease have been reported in the U.S. from 1955-2006, which is considerably lower than the rates in Central and South America. Fewer locally-acquired human Chagas disease cases in the U.S. is presumably due to better awareness and better economic conditions keeping the vectors outside the home. Triatoma spp. in the U.S., including T. indictiva, have slower times for defecation following a blood meal compared to South American species, which could be an additional reason reducing the risk of acquiring Chagas disease in the U.S.
