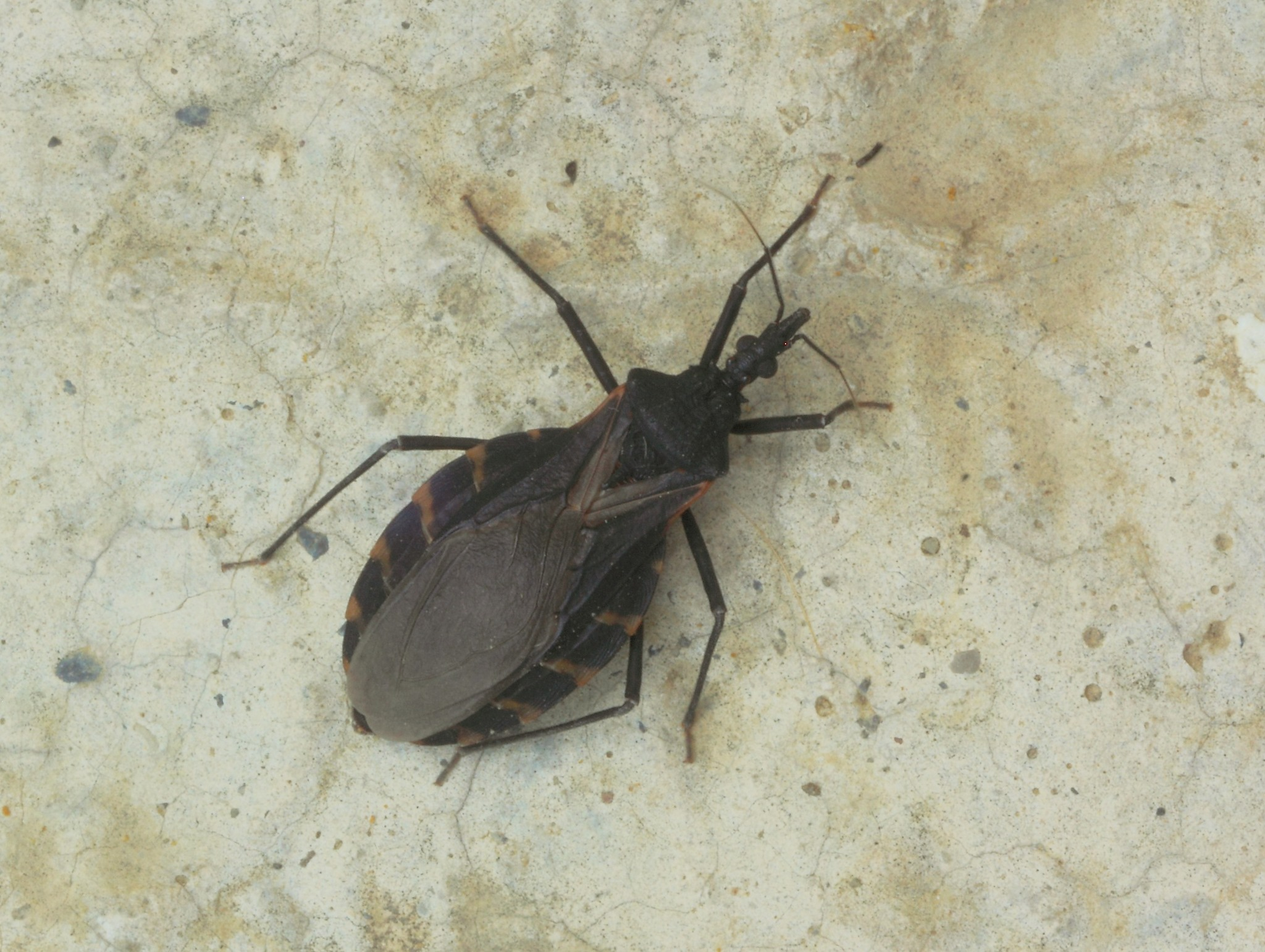

Scientific classification
- Domain: Eukaryota
- Kingdom: Animalia
- Phylum: Arthropoda
- Class: Insecta
- Order: Hemiptera
- Suborder: Heteroptera
- Family: Reduviidae
- Genus: Triatoma
- Species: T. gerstaeckeri

Binomial name
- Triatoma gerstaeckeri (Stal, 1859)

= Triatoma gerstaeckeri =

Species of true bug

Triatoma gerstaeckeri is an assassin bug in the genus Triatoma (kissing bugs). It is an important vector of Trypanosoma cruzi, the causative agent of Chagas disease. The range of T. gerstaeckeri is from the south-western United States (New Mexico, Texas) to north-eastern Mexico. T. gerstaeckeri goes through three stages during its paurometabolous life cycle: egg, nymphal instars and adult.

== Physical characteristics ==
T. gerstaeckeri is between 20 and 30 mm long when fully developed. It is all black except for their yellow horizontal lines outside of the pronotum. The tip of its mouthparts have hairs, but the rest of the mouthparts do not. T. gerstaeckeri have long, narrow legs and a flat head. The first segment of its antennae is shorter than the clypeus on the insect's head. T. gerstaeckeri have tubercles on its sides, and it has a round posterior that is very wrinkly. It has black forewings that cover the abdomen; the base of these forewings are yellowish orange.

== Habitat ==
T. gerstaeckeri is mostly found in the dry climates of northern Mexico, southern/central Texas and New Mexico where there is a lot of scrubby vegetation. Other Triatoma species are found throughout the United States. In Texas, 63% of the T. gerstaeckeri identified were found near houses. Out of 156 specimens of T. gerstaeckeri tested for the presence of T. cruzi in Texas, 55% were infected. In Mexico, 94% of the T. gerstaeckeri identified were found near houses.

== Role in disease ==
T. gerstaeckeri is a reservoir for the parasite T. cruzi, which causes Chagas Disease. This is a very relevant disease in the Western Hemisphere because there are about 56,000 new incidents of Chagas Disease every year and about 12,000 deaths annually caused by this disease. All blood-feeding arthropods in the genus Triatoma are vectors of T. cruzi, so these numbers are not caused by T. gerstaeckeri alone. Chagas Disease is spread when an infected triatomine defecates on or near a host, causing the parasite to enter the body of the host, usually through the site of a wound. This is usually how T. cruzi is transmitted, but it can also occur during blood transfusion, organ donation or the consumption of contaminated food or drink. T. cruzi is not transmitted directly by biting. The most common animal hosts of T. gerstaeckeri are woodrats, but raccoons, opossums, humans and dogs are also common. There is no vaccine for Chagas Disease, so to decrease the prevalence of the disease, the spread of the T. gerstaeckeri and other Triatomine bugs must be limited.

== Development and life cycle ==
T. gerstaeckeri undergoes gradual metamorphosis (paurometabolous development) which means that there are three stages to its life cycle: egg, nymph and adult. The life cycle of T. gerstaeckeri begins when the female lays eggs. The eggs of T. gerstaeckeri are white when laid, but turn light pink shortly thereafter. The weight range of the eggs is from .832 mg to 1.125 mg. Female T. gerstaeckeri lay more eggs when there are changing temperatures, but a higher percentage of eggs hatch if there is a constant temperature. Females lay eggs for the duration of their life. Next, T. gerstaeckeri goes through a series of molts. There are five of these sub-stages in the life cycle of T. gerstaeckeri, called its five nymphal instars. The time of development for all stages is longer when temperatures are dropped. The average development time of egg through fifth instar for T. gerstaeckeri at 27 degrees Celsius is 213.9 days; with the temperature range from 18 to 30 degrees Celsius these same stages took an average of 361.9 days to develop. The highest percentage of nymphs molted when their blood meals were from mammals, particularly squirrels. The percentage weight gain for T. gerstaeckeri due to blood feeding is highest during the first instar. T. gerstaeckeri then become adults and individuals mate and reproduce to start the cycle over again. T. gerstaeckeri has a life cycle of nine to fourteen months.

== Notes ==
- Crawford, Britnee A., and Christopher M. Kribs-Zaleta. "Vector Migration and Dispersal Rates for Sylvatic Trypanosoma Cruzi Transmission." Ecological Complexity 14 (2013): 146–47. Web.
- Kjos, Sonia A., Paula L. Marcet, and Ellen M. Dotson. "Identification of Bloodmeal Sources and Trypanosoma Cruzi Infection in Triatomine Bugs from Residential Settings in Texas, the United States." Journal of Medical Entomology 50.5 (2013): 1126–127. Web of Science. Web.
- Myers, P., R. Espinosa, C. S. Parr, T. Jones, G. S. Hammond, and T. A. Dewey. "Animal Diversity Web." ADW: Triatoma Gerstaeckeri: CLASSIFICATION. Regents of the University of Michigan, 2012. Web. 24 Oct. 2013.
- Pippin, Warren F. "The Biology and Vector Capability of Triatoma Sanguisuga Texana Usinger and Triatoma Gerstaeckeri (Stal) Compared with Rhodnius Prolixus (Stal) (Hemiptera: Triatominae)." Journal of Medical Entomology 7 (1970): 30+. Web.
- Sandoval-Ruiz, César A., Luis Cervantesperedo, Fredy S. Mendoza-Palmero, and Sergio Ibáñez-Bernal. "The Triatominae (Hemiptera: Heteroptera: Reduviidae) of Veracruz, Mexico: Geographic Distribution, Taxonomic Redescriptions, and a Key." Zootaxa 3487 (2012): 16. Web.
- Sarkar, Sahotra, Stavana Strutz, Chissa-Louise Rivaldi, Blake Sissel, David Frank, and Victor Sanchez-Cordero. "Chagas Disease Risk in Texas." NCBI. N.p., 5 Oct. 2010. Web.
- Sonia, Kjos A., Karen F. Snowden, and Jimmy K. Olson. "Biogeography and Trypanosoma Cruzi Infection Prevalence of Chagas Disease Vectors in Texas, USA." Vector-Borne and Zoonotic Diseases 9 (2009): 44+. Web.
- "Triatoma Gerstaeckeri." Centers for Disease Control and Prevention. Centers for Disease Control and Prevention, 02 Nov. 2010. Web. 30 Oct. 2013.
