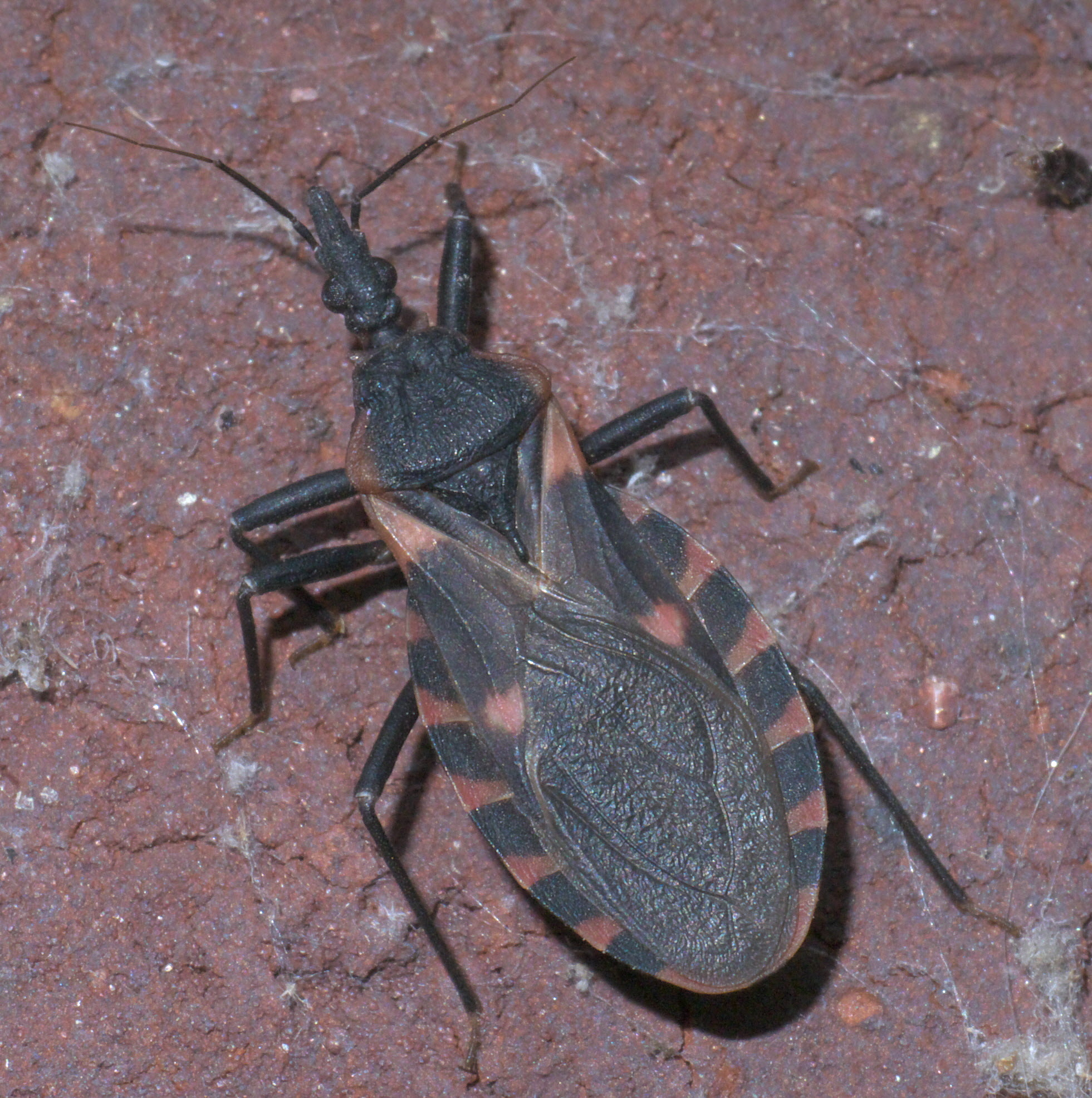

Scientific classification
- Domain: Eukaryota
- Kingdom: Animalia
- Phylum: Arthropoda
- Class: Insecta
- Order: Hemiptera
- Suborder: Heteroptera
- Family: Reduviidae
- Genus: Triatoma
- Species: T. sanguisuga

Binomial name
- Triatoma sanguisuga (LeConte, 1855)

Synonyms
- Conorhinus sanguisuga LeConte, 1855; Conorhinus sanguisugus (LeConte, 1855)

= Triatoma sanguisuga =

Species of true bug

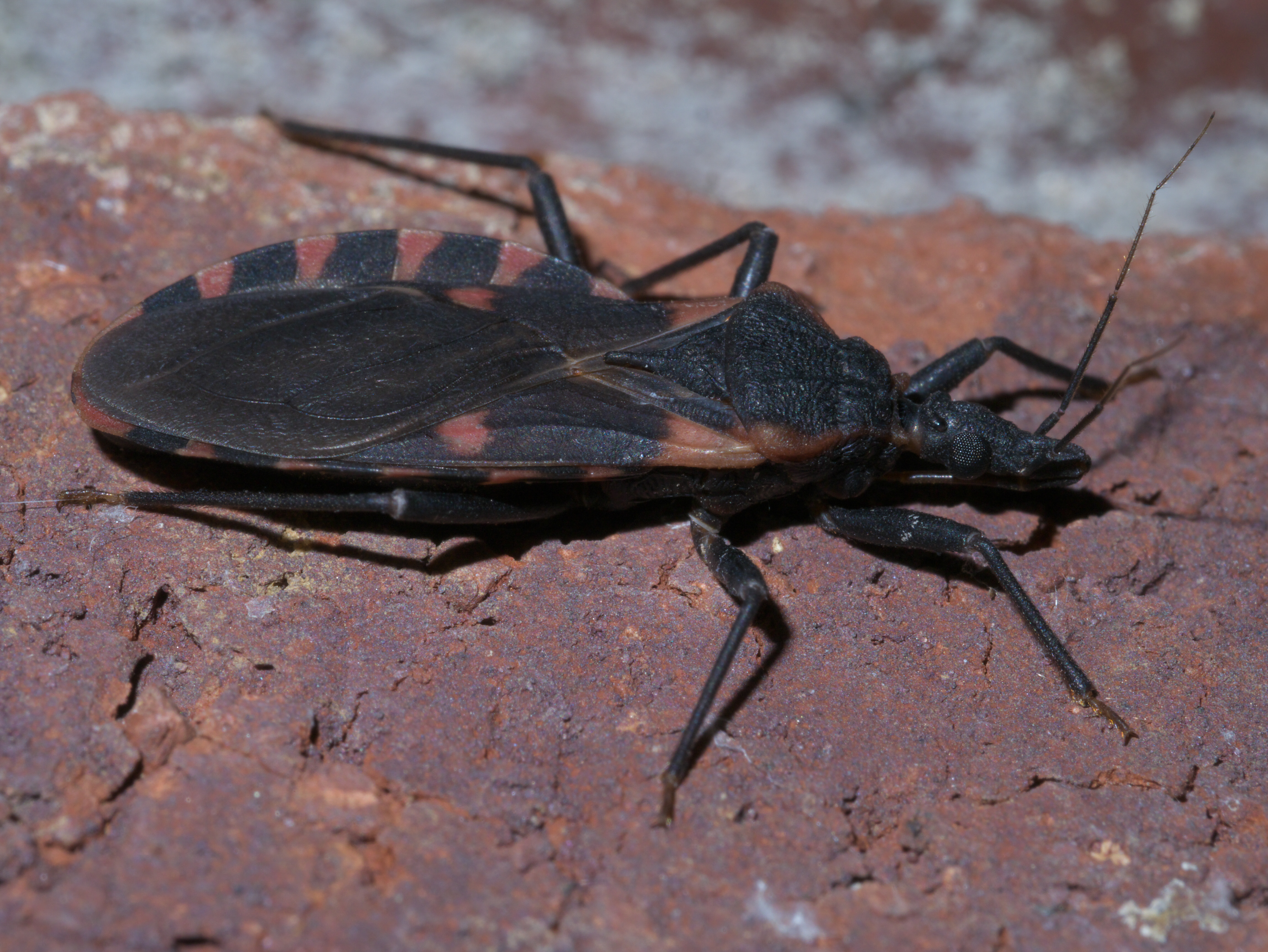
Triatoma sanguisuga

Triatoma sanguisuga, also known as the eastern bloodsucking conenose, is an insect of the Triatominae subfamily, known as kissing bugs.

== Taxonomy ==
It was first described by John Lawrence LeConte in 1855 and named Conorhinus sanguisuga.

== Description ==
They are generally 16 to 21 mm long, black or dark brown, with six reddish-orange spots along each side of a wide abdomen. They are winged, have kinked, six-segmented antennae, and have a slender, tapered proboscis used for feeding.

== Distribution ==
It is found throughout North America and Latin America, and is common in the Southeastern United States.. Its range within the eastern United States is south of Pennsylvania, in the midwest north to Ohio and Missouri and in the southwest to Arizona.

== Life cycle ==
The female Triatoma sanguisuga typically lays eggs four to six days after a blood meal. One female may lay hundreds of eggs in its lifetime. After the egg hatches, the immature bug takes a blood meal and molts eight times before reaching maturity. Triatoma sanguisuga feeds on blood from mammals such as raccoons, rats, dogs, cats, and humans. In addition, tree frogs can be a significant source of food.

== Chagas disease ==
Triatoma sanguisuga is a known vector for Trypanosoma cruzi, a zooflagellate protozoan that inhabits the blood and causes Chagas disease. An estimated six to eight million people are currently infected with Chagas disease, primarily in South America. There are currently around 28,000 new cases of Chagas disease annually, a significant decrease from 700,000 new cases diagnosed in 1990.

Like other species of kissing bugs, Triatoma sanguisuga is known to bite humans in the face, usually around the mouth or eyes, and feed off the blood. This normally occurs during sleep. These bites are usually not particularly painful, but they are irritating. It is common for the sleeping victim to scratch or rub their face near the bite, which may cause any feces deposited by the insect to enter the site of the bite. If the insect is infected with Trypanosoma cruzi, this can infect the human and cause Chagas disease.

However, Triatoma sanguisuga does not defecate while feeding as does the South American Triatoma infestans, making it much less likely to transmit the pathogen Trypanosoma cruzi to its human hosts. Even so, at one location in Louisiana, 40% of Triatoma sanguisuga were found to contain the pathogen Trypanosoma cruzi, and 38% of these had fed on humans. In neighboring Texas, though, human blood has rarely been detected in any species of Triatoma.

In the United States, documented vectorborne cases of Chagas disease are rare. There have been a total of seven cases of human infections from any species of Triatoma reported in Texas, California, Tennessee, and Louisiana.

Triatoma sanguisuga can be controlled in the home by using screens on all windows and doors, and sealing all cracks in walls and ceilings. In addition, vacuuming and general cleaning will help remove a suitable habitat for the bugs.
