= Triatoma pallidipennis =

Scientific classification
- Kingdom: Animalia
- Phylum: Arthropoda
- Clade: Pancrustacea
- Class: Insecta
- Order: Hemiptera
- Suborder: Heteroptera
- Family: Reduviidae
- Genus: Triatoma
- Species: T. pallidipennis

Binomial name
- Triatoma pallidipennis Stål, 1872

Species of assassin bug native to Mexico

Triatoma pallidipennis is a species of assassin bug that belongs to the subfamily Triatominae (kissing bugs). It is widely distributed in Mexico. It is a major vector of Trypanosoma cruzi, a parasitic euglenoid which causes Chagas disease.

It seems that the immune response of T. pallidipennis against bacterial species like E. coli is enhanced by feeding off of mammalian blood. It may influence the capacity for transmitting T. cruzi.
