= T. platensis =

T. platensis may refer to:

- Toxodon platensis, an extinct mammal species of the late Pliocene and Pleistocene epochs indigenous to South America
- Triatoma platensis, an assassin bug species

== See also ==
- Platensis
