= Ataenius punctatohirsutus =

Scientific classification
- Kingdom: Animalia
- Phylum: Arthropoda
- Clade: Pancrustacea
- Class: Insecta
- Order: Coleoptera
- Suborder: Polyphaga
- Infraorder: Scarabaeiformia
- Family: Scarabaeidae
- Genus: Ataenius
- Species: A. punctatohirsutus

Binomial name
- Ataenius punctatohirsutus Schmidt, 1909

Species of beetle

Ataenius punctatohirsutus is a species of beetle of the family Scarabaeidae. It is found in Argentina.

== Description ==
Adults reach a length of about 5–6.5 mm (0.20–0.26 in). They have an elongate-oblong, moderately shiny, partially setaceous, dark castaneous to piceous body, with the legs reddish.

== Life history ==
Specimens have been collected in abandoned nests of birds occupied by field mouses, and also collected with Triatoma platensis.
