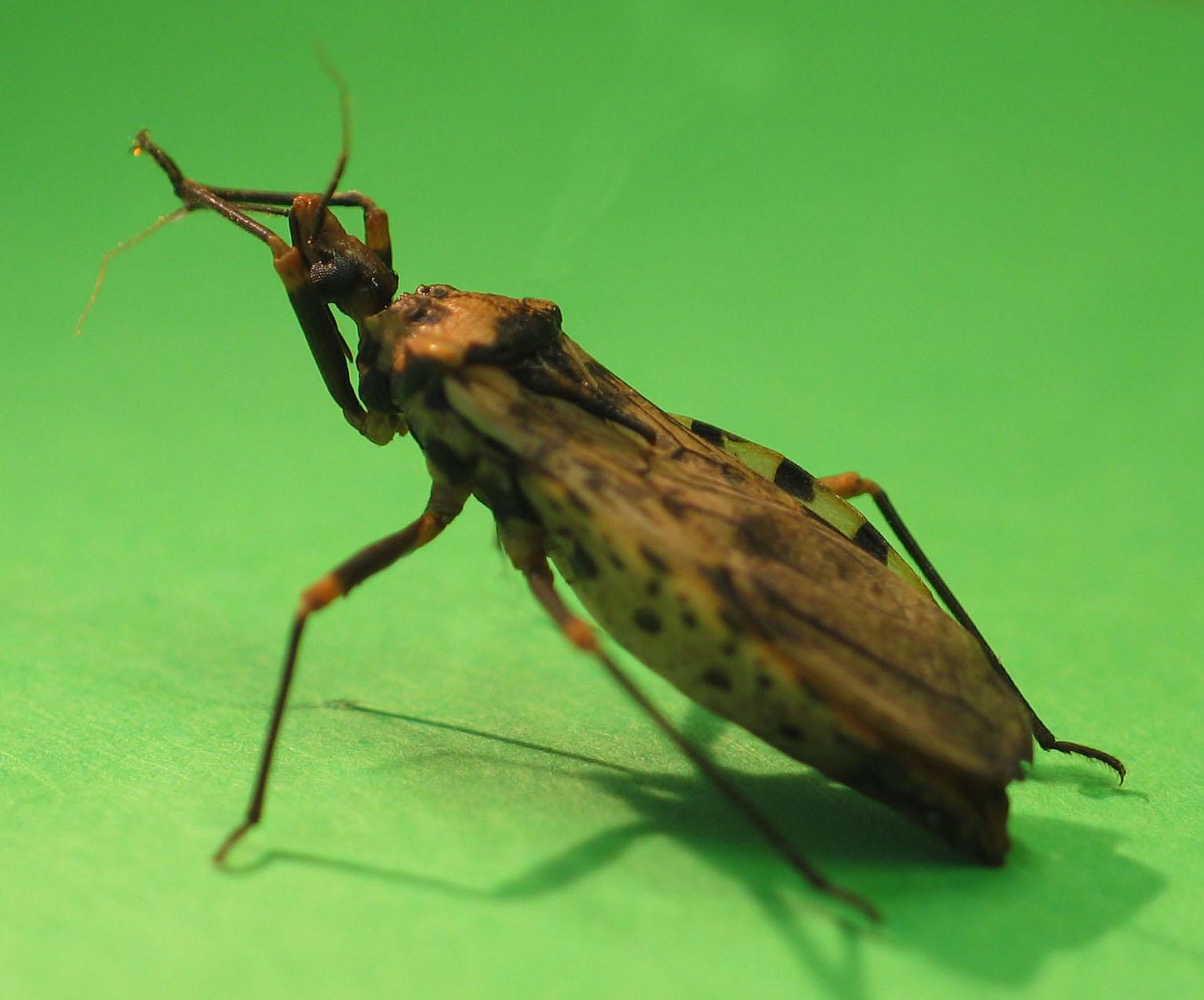
- Panstrongylus geniculatus

Scientific classification
- Domain: Eukaryota
- Kingdom: Animalia
- Phylum: Arthropoda
- Class: Insecta
- Order: Hemiptera
- Suborder: Heteroptera
- Family: Reduviidae
- Subfamily: Triatominae
- Tribe: Triatomini
- Genus: Panstrongylus; Berg, 1879

Species
- See text.

= Panstrongylus =

Genus of true bugs

Panstrongylus is a genus of insects that belongs to the subfamily Triatominae. Its members are found from Mexico into South America.

== Species ==
- Panstrongylus chinai (Del Ponte, 1929) (Tc)
- Panstrongylus diasi Pinto & Lent, 1946
- Panstrongylus geniculatus (Latreille 1811) (Tc)
- Panstrongylus guentheri Berg, 1879 (Tc)
- Panstrongylus howardi (Neiva, 1911) (Tc) (endemic to Ecuador)
- Panstrongylus humeralis (Usinger, 1939) (Tc)
- Panstrongylus lenti Galvão & Palma, 1968
- Panstrongylus lignarius (Walker, 1873) (Tc)
- Panstrongylus lutzi (Neiva & Pinto, 1923b) (Tc)
- Panstrongylus megistus (Burmeister, 1835) (Tc)
- Panstrongylus mitarakaensis (Bérenger & Blanchet, 2007)
- Panstrongylus rufotuberculatus (Champion, 1899) (Tc)
- Panstrongylus tupynambai Lent, 1942 (Tc)

(Tc) means associated with Trypanosoma cruzi
