= Triatoma melanica =

Scientific classification
- Domain: Eukaryota
- Kingdom: Animalia
- Phylum: Arthropoda
- Class: Insecta
- Order: Hemiptera
- Suborder: Heteroptera
- Family: Reduviidae
- Genus: Triatoma
- Species: T. melanica

Binomial name
- Triatoma melanica Neiva & Lent, 1941

Species of true bug

Triatoma melanica is a hematophagous insect, a Chagas disease vector, included in the Triatominae group. It occurs in the north of Minas Gerais state, Brazil, and is found almost exclusively in silvatic environment. However, sporadically it may also invade houses. T. melanica was originally described as Triatoma brasiliensis melanica Neiva & Lent, 1941. Recently, it was redescribed with a new specific status, due to its distinct morphology, genetics, and biogeographic characteristics.
