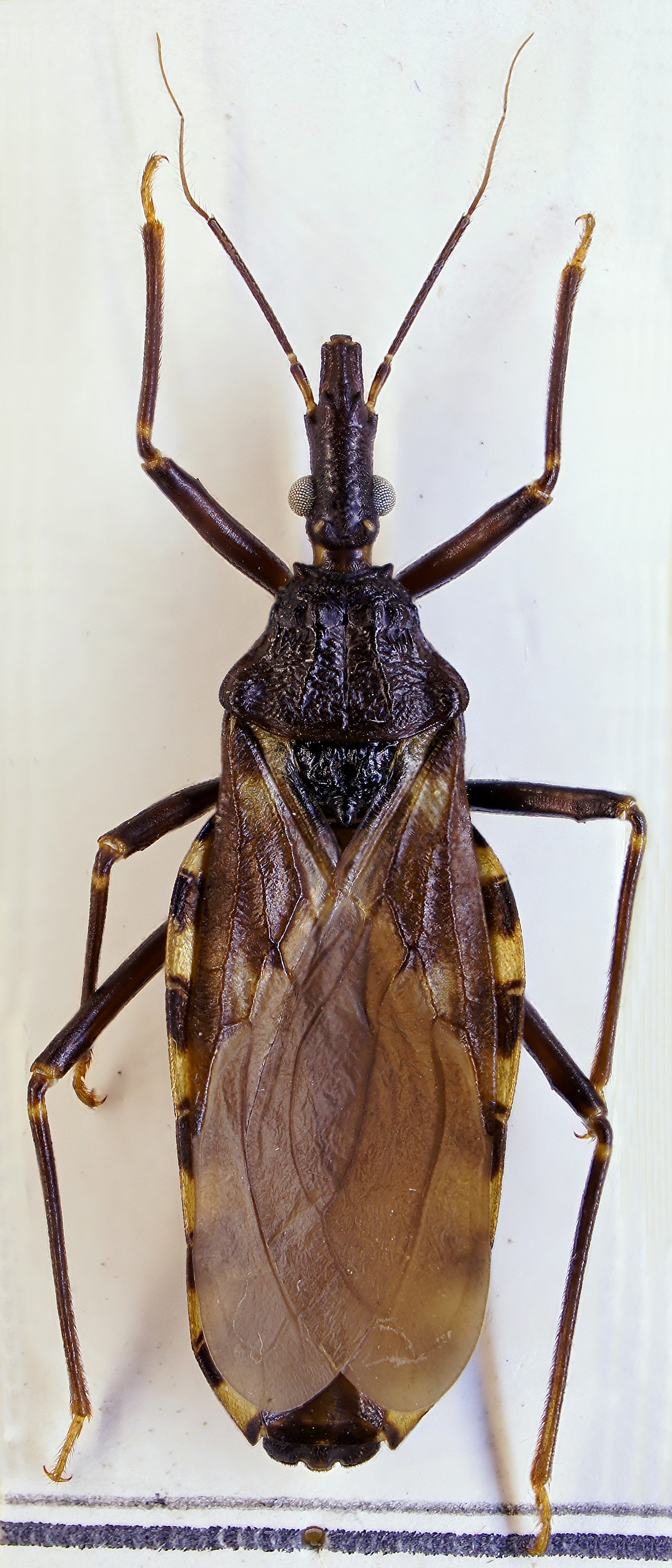
- Adult of Triatoma infestans

Scientific classification
- Kingdom: Animalia
- Phylum: Arthropoda
- Clade: Pancrustacea
- Class: Insecta
- Order: Hemiptera
- Suborder: Heteroptera
- Family: Reduviidae
- Genus: Triatoma
- Species: T. infestans

Binomial name
- Triatoma infestans Klug, 1834

Synonyms
- Triatoma infestans melanosoma Martínez, Olmedo & Carcavallo, 1987

= Triatoma infestans =

Blood-sucking bug that spreads disease

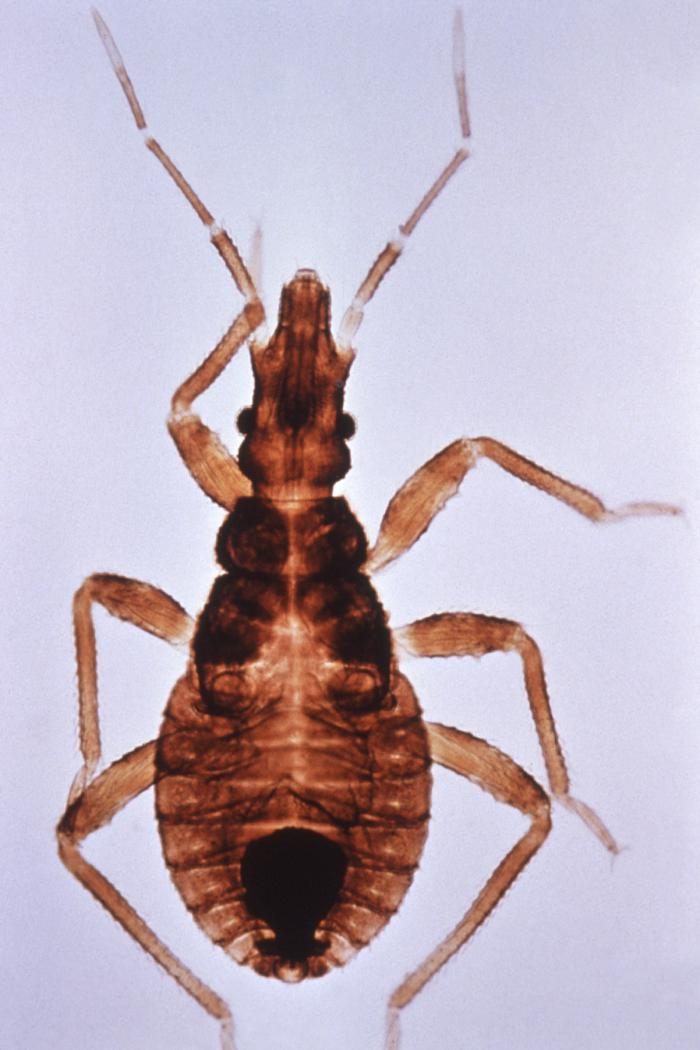
Triatoma infestans nymph — dorsal view

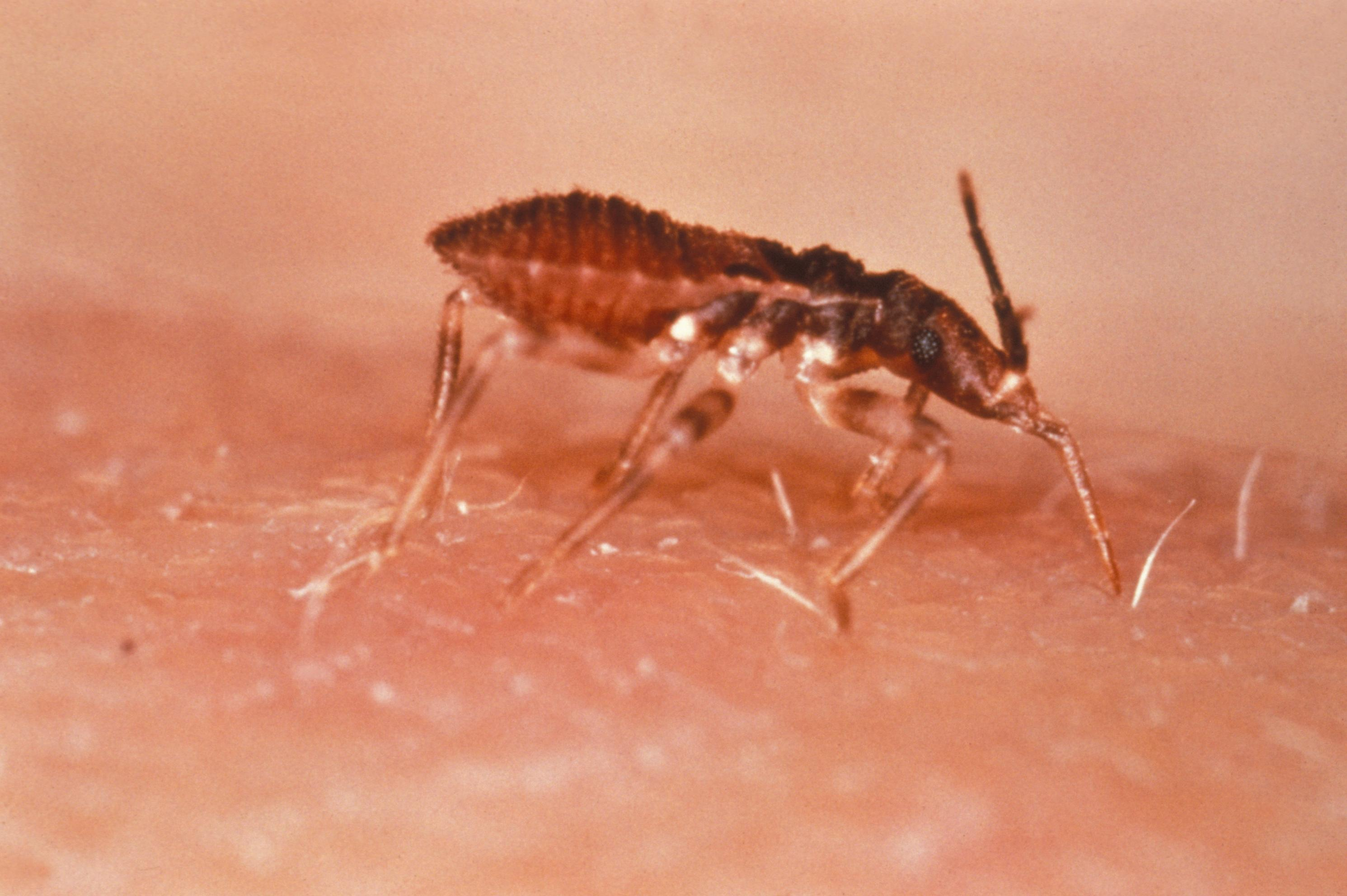
Triatoma infestans 1st instar nymph feeding on a human host

Triatoma infestans, commonly called winchuka or vinchuca in Argentina, Bolivia, Uruguay and Chile, barbeiro in Brazil, chipo in Venezuela and also known as "kissing bug" or "barber bug" in English, is a blood-sucking bug (like virtually all the members of its subfamily Triatominae) and the most important vector of Trypanosoma cruzi which can lead to Chagas disease. It is widespread in the Southern Cone countries of South America. (Note: p. 102, "Between 1913 and 1924 it became evident that the disease was not confined to Brazil; with some epidemiological variants, it was diagnosed in EI Salvador, Venezuela, Peru, and Argentina. From then on, reports of new cases from almost all the countries in the Western Hemisphere indicated its wide distribution (211).") This region has joined the control intervention called Southern Cone Initiative managed by the PAHO.

During the Beagle survey voyage, Charles Darwin noted in his journal for 26 March 1835 having "experienced an attack, & it deserves no less a name, of the Benchuca, the great black bug of the Pampas. It is most disgusting to feel soft wingless insects, about an inch long, crawling over ones body; before sucking they are quite thin, but afterwards round & bloated with blood, & in this state they are easily squashed." Richard Keynes describes this Benchuca as being Triatoma infestans. Darwin is speculated to have died from chronic Chagas disease.

== Distribution ==
T. infestans has both a wide range of habitats/ecologies and geographic areas it inhabits - the former being the reason for the latter. (Note: p. 104, "Its remarkable adaptability to different climatic conditions easily explains its wide-spread distribution (242).")

=== Ecological distribution ===
In South America T. infestans is almost an exclusively domestic species, (Note: p. 102, "With the arrival of man, the consequent disturbance of the natural foci enabled some triatomine vectors to be introduced, either actively or passively, into the new artificial ecotopes. Those insects that had a broad ecological valence became adapted to their new niches. Thus, from exoanthropic insects they became partially or almost entirely synanthropic, occupying the household environment but with some species still preserving their natural biotopes. In this way, man and some of his domestic animals became involved in the epidemiological chain, converting the disease into a true anthropozoonosis. The ratio of domestic and sylvatic cycles depends mainly on the species of vector involved and on the socioeconomic conditions prevalent in the new environment, which prompted Prata (178) to declare that Chagas' disease today is the result of ignorance and poverty. In some areas certain species of vector have become so adapted to the house that the transmission cycle involves only man and domestic animals, a situation that could well have existed for several centuries. In other areas sylvatic foci still exist where man is not involved, and combinations of these situations occur as well.") (Note: p. 104, "The most domestic of these bugs is T. infestans...") especially as a household pest in the Cochabamba Valley in Bolivia and parts of Paraguay and Argentina. (Note: p. 104-5, "... and it is the principal vector in extensive areas of Chile (69, 70, 149), Argentina (71), Uruguay (155), Bolivia (33, 224), Paraguay (41), Brazil (11), and southern Peru (104). The southern limit of the species seems to be in the Province of Chubut, Argentina, near the 45th parallel (110), and it has been observed as high as 3682 m above sea level in that country (44). In Brazil this species has recently (1955-1964) spread widely, probably carried in the luggage of immigrants from the south up to the northeastern State of Pernambuco (128); in the same manner, it could easily invade still other areas of the country. ... In Peru a similar situation occurred as the species was transported by man north to Lima (214). The relationship of T. infestans with man has been longstanding; it has been recognized as a household pest in different foci, such as the Cochabamba Valley in Bolivia and some parts of Paraguay and Argentina, since the early seventeenth century (124). Nevertheless it still maintains a few natural biotopes in Argentina (28, 138, 228), Paraguay (227), and Brazil (12, 23).")

There remain a few freeliving populations in Argentina, Paraguay, and Brazil.

Tends to displace other Triatominae vectors of Chagas including Panstrongylus megistus, (Note: p. 105, "Panstrongylus megistus ... It seems to compete disadvantageously with T. infestans but moves into houses when the latter is eliminated by insecticides (7).") T. sordida, T. brasiliensis, and T. pseudomaculata.

=== Geographical distribution ===
Brazil (only widespread from 1955-1964, likely by immigrants from the south to Pernambuco, likely continuing to be spread by internal migration), El Salvador, Venezuela, Peru (anthropic transportation), Argentina (especially as a household pest in some areas), Paraguay (especially as a household pest in some areas). In Chile's Atacama Region the vinchuca has been noted to be common in Inca de Oro and Quebrada Chañaral Alto.

== Biology ==
=== Defecation ===
Defecation is central to the T. cruzi transmission cycle of Triatomines. There is no direct transmission by feeding, instead deposition of parasites is associated with a bloodmeal but occurs solely by defecation. Trumper and Gorla 1991 find transmission to be inversely correlated with vector density: Crowded areas tend to have T. infestans interrupting each other, and interrupted feedings do not provide as much as a completed bloodmeal. T. infestans is unlikely to defecate when not sated and so rarely transmits. Low vector density areas therefore have high rates of transmission.

== See also ==
- Triatominae
- Triatoma protracta
