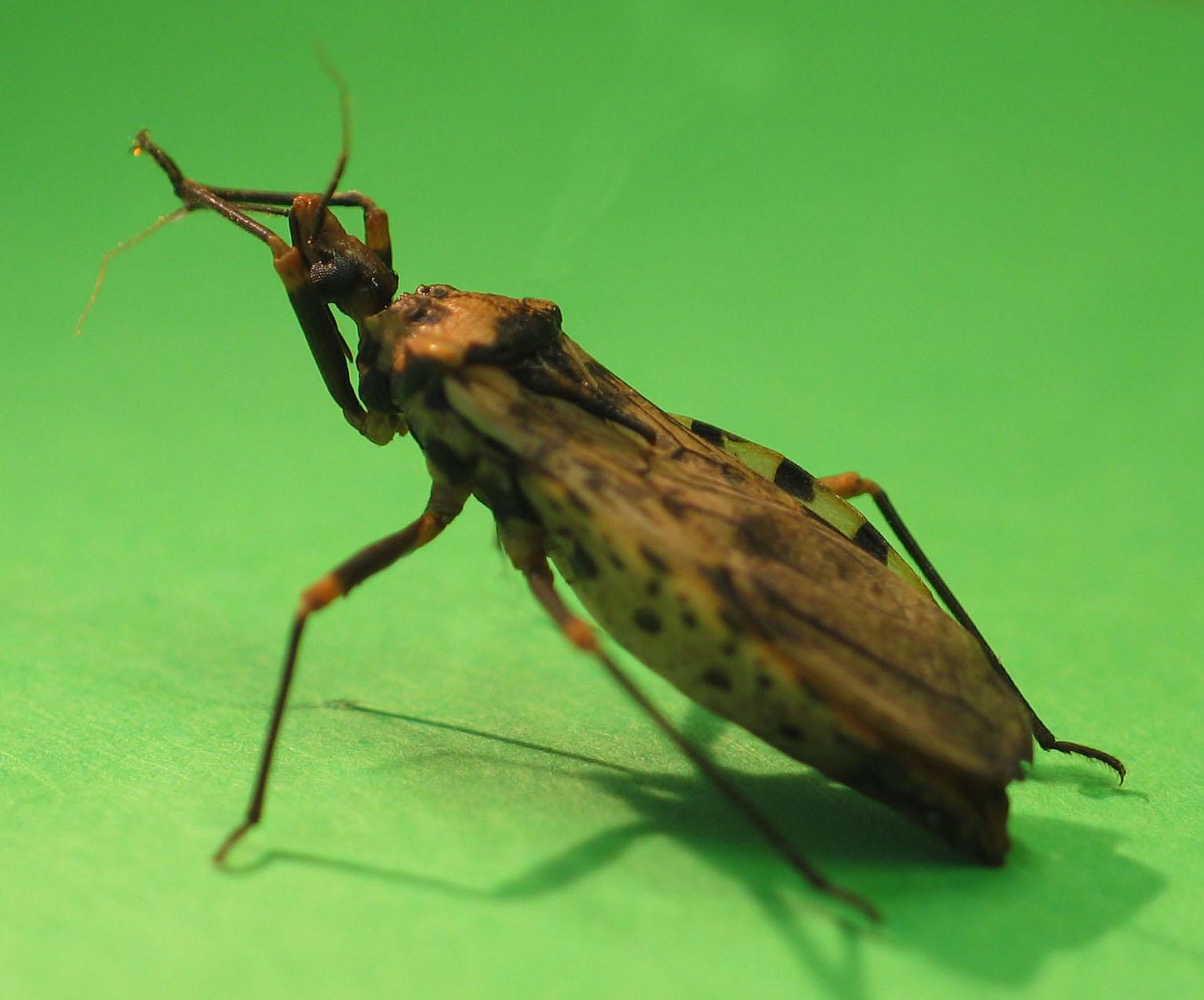

Scientific classification
- Kingdom: Animalia
- Phylum: Arthropoda
- Clade: Pancrustacea
- Class: Insecta
- Order: Hemiptera
- Suborder: Heteroptera
- Family: Reduviidae
- Genus: Panstrongylus
- Species: P. geniculatus

Binomial name
- Panstrongylus geniculatus (Latreille, 1811)

= Panstrongylus geniculatus =

Species of true bug

Panstrogylus geniculatus is a blood-sucking sylvatic insect noted as a putative vector of minor importance in the transmission of Trypanosoma cruzi to humans; this is a parasite, which causes Chagas disease. The insect is described as sylvatic; subsisting primarily in humid forests, and is also known to inhabit vertebrate nesting places such as those of the armadillo (dasypus novemcinctus or dasypus), and is also involved in enzootic transmission of T. cruzi to those species. It has wide distribution throughout 16 Latin American countries.

There have been few scientific studies of this particular species because of the low number of collected specimens and difficulties in rearing and maintaining populations in the laboratory. However, currently P. geniculatus is receiving attention as a potential vector of Chagas disease (American trypanosomiasis) due to reports of this species invading the domestic and peridomestic habitats over a vast area: Venezuela, Colombia, Brazil, Peru, Ecuador, and Argentina.

P. geniculatus is apparently in the process of domiciliation, using the same strategies as highly domesticated species like Triatoma infestans and Rhodnius prolixus. This is also the case for other sylvatic triatomine species (Triatominae) that are experiencing similar ecological pressures originating from human disruption of the natural habitat.

== Prevalence in Venezuela ==
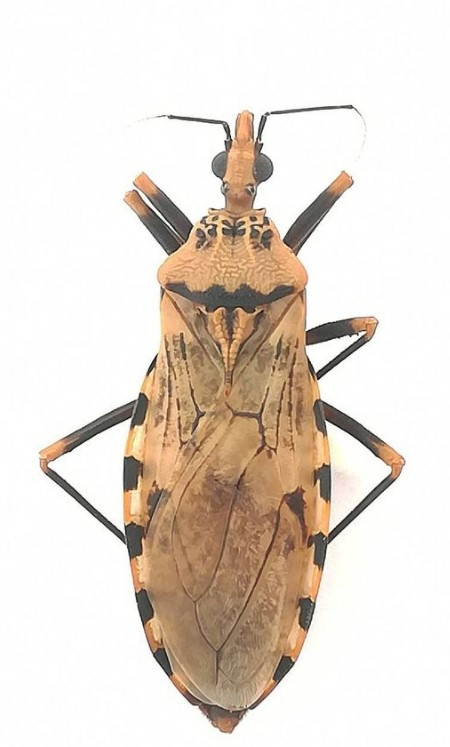
Panstrongylus geniculatus

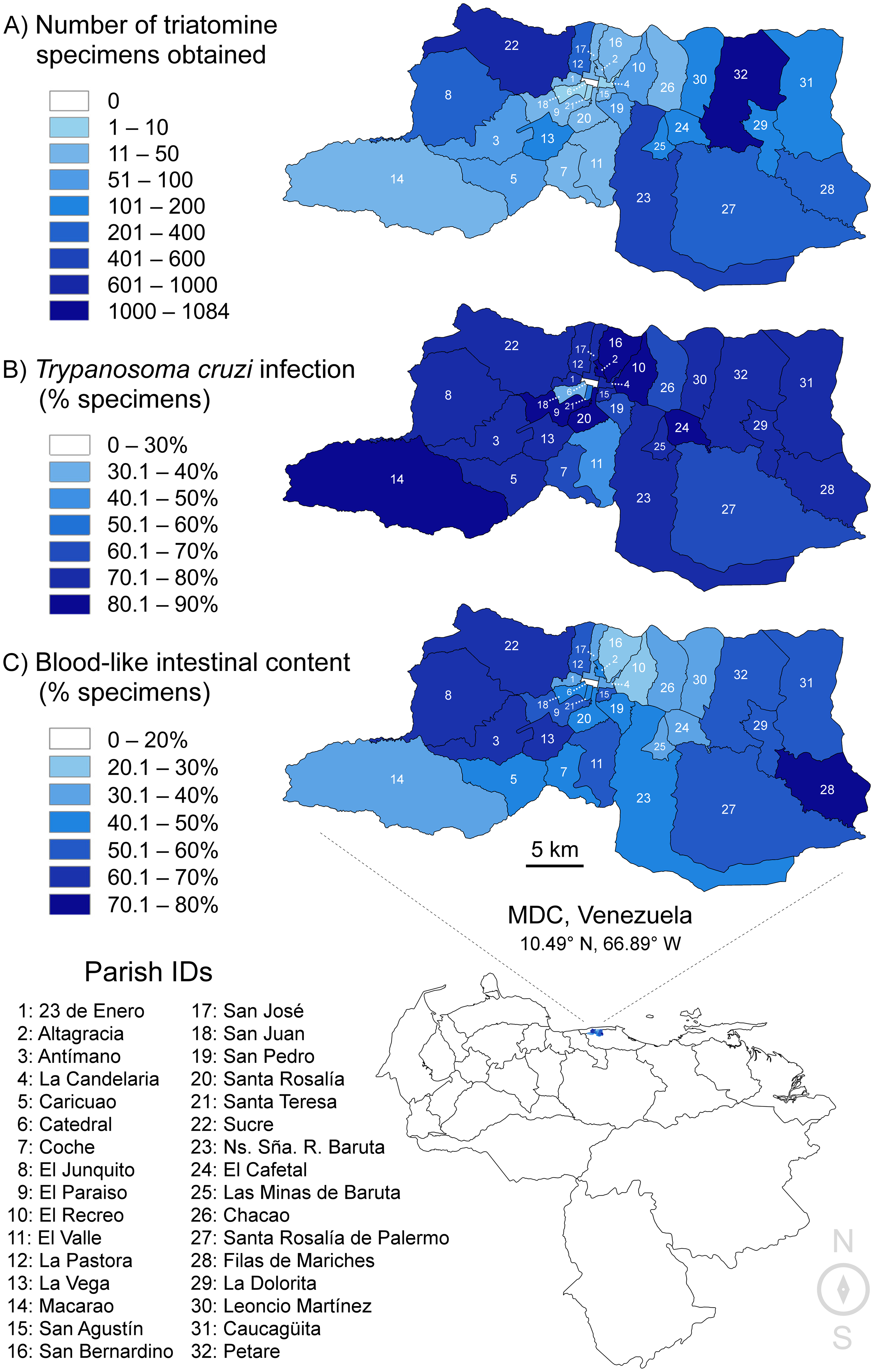
A. Numbers of triatomine specimens obtained, B Rates of natural T. cruzi infection in triatomine specimens an C potential bloodmeal Triatomines from each MDC parish for the collection period 2007–2019

A 2005 study conducted by the Universidad Central de Venezuela, used Panstrongylus specimens collected from Caracas City and the neighboring areas of Miranda and Vargas States. Through the use of a dot-ELISA test and other techniques to determine the presence of Trypanosoma cruzi, it was found through the examination of feces that 67 of the 88 (76.1%) specimens collected were carrying the parasite and that 53 (60.2%) of those reacted positively to human antiserum. A 2014 publication of citizen science–based domiciliary triatomine collection carried out between 2007 and 2013 in the MDC has advanced understanding of urban T. cruzi prevalence, this publication shows the geographical distribution of triatomine bugs in Caracas, natural infection of triatomine bugs with T. cruzi, the presence of blood in the stomachs of the triatomine bugs and a study of the nymphal stages of P. geniculatus in Caracas. A total of 3551 triatomines were captured from 31 of the 32 parishes surveyed. The vast majority of these were identified as P. geniculatus (98.96%), followed by Triatoma nigromaculata (0.59%), Triatoma maculata (0.39%) and Rhodnius prolixus (0.06%). For 2023 a recent publication demonstrates risk of urban Chagas disease transmission in Caracas, Venezuela by vector mapping and bloodmeal metabarcoding.
