= Triatoma carrioni =

Scientific classification
- Domain: Eukaryota
- Kingdom: Animalia
- Phylum: Arthropoda
- Class: Insecta
- Order: Hemiptera
- Suborder: Heteroptera
- Family: Reduviidae
- Genus: Triatoma
- Species: T. carrioni

Binomial name
- Triatoma carrioni Larrousse, 1926

Species of true bug

Triatoma carrioni is a blood-sucking bug and probable vector of the flagellate protozoan that causes Chagas disease. It was discovered by F. Larrousse in 1926.

Type: National Museum of Natural History, Smithsonian Institution, Washington DC.

Paratype M: FIOCRUZ, Rio de Janeiro.

Type locality: Loja Province, Ecuador.

Distribution: South Ecuador, North Peru.

Biology: silvatic, rodent nests and opossum lodges; also peridomestic, and occasionally in houses.
