= Triatoma recurva =

Scientific classification
- Kingdom: Animalia
- Phylum: Arthropoda
- Clade: Pancrustacea
- Class: Insecta
- Order: Hemiptera
- Suborder: Heteroptera
- Family: Reduviidae
- Genus: Triatoma
- Species: T. recurva

Binomial name
- Triatoma recurva (Stål, 1868)

Species of true bug

Triatoma recurva is a species of kissing bug in the family Reduviidae. It is found in Central America and North America. Like all of the kissing bugs in the genus Triatoma, it is an obligate blood feeder that primarily targets vertebrates. However, individuals can consume the hemolymph of arthropods, and can develop to maturity on a diet consisting entirely of cockroaches.
