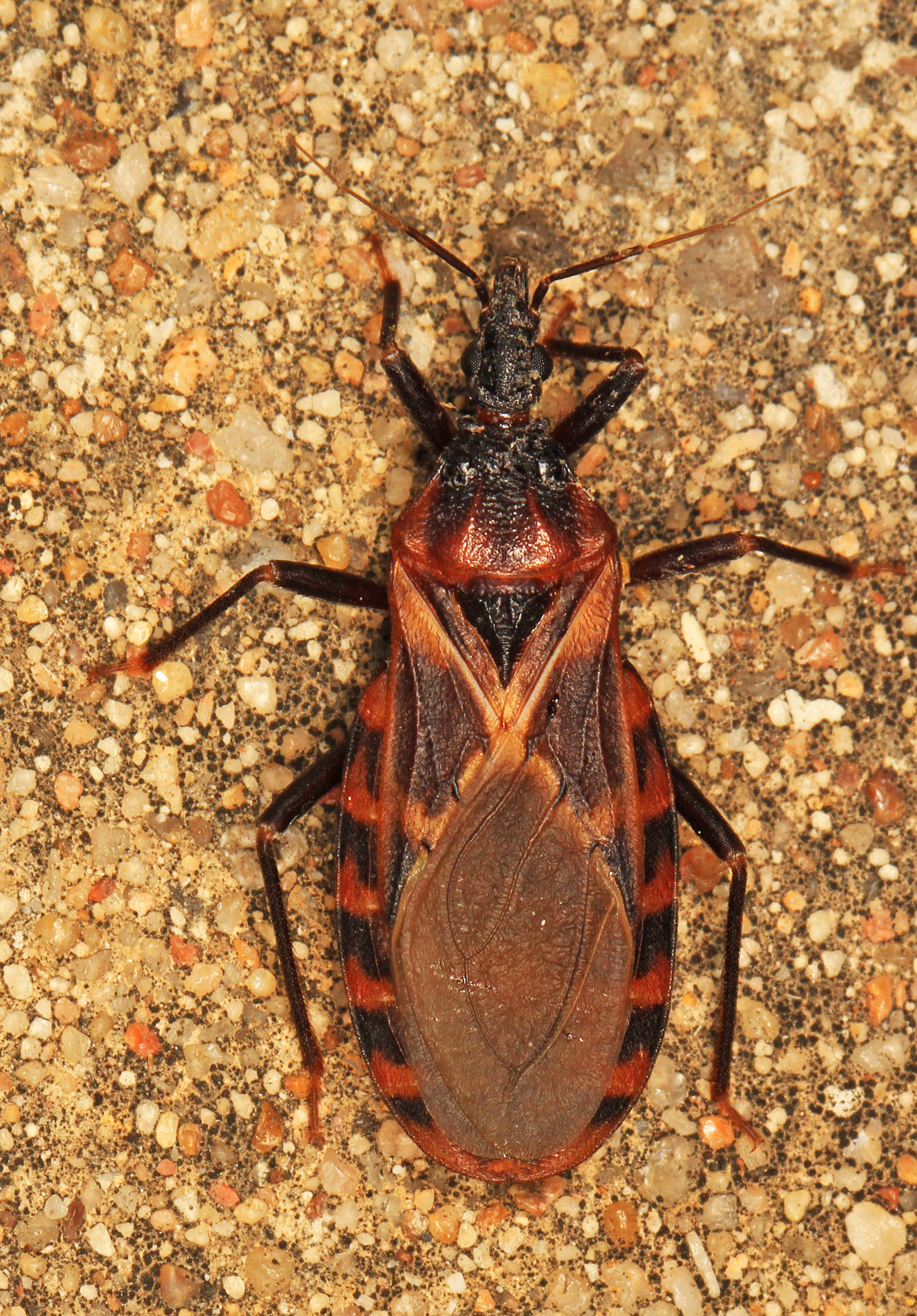

Scientific classification
- Kingdom: Animalia
- Phylum: Arthropoda
- Clade: Pancrustacea
- Class: Insecta
- Order: Hemiptera
- Suborder: Heteroptera
- Family: Reduviidae
- Genus: Triatoma
- Species: T. lecticularia

Binomial name
- Triatoma lecticularia (Stål, 1859)

= Triatoma lecticularia =

Species of true bug

Triatoma lecticularia is a species of kissing bug in the family Reduviidae. It is found in Central America and North America.
