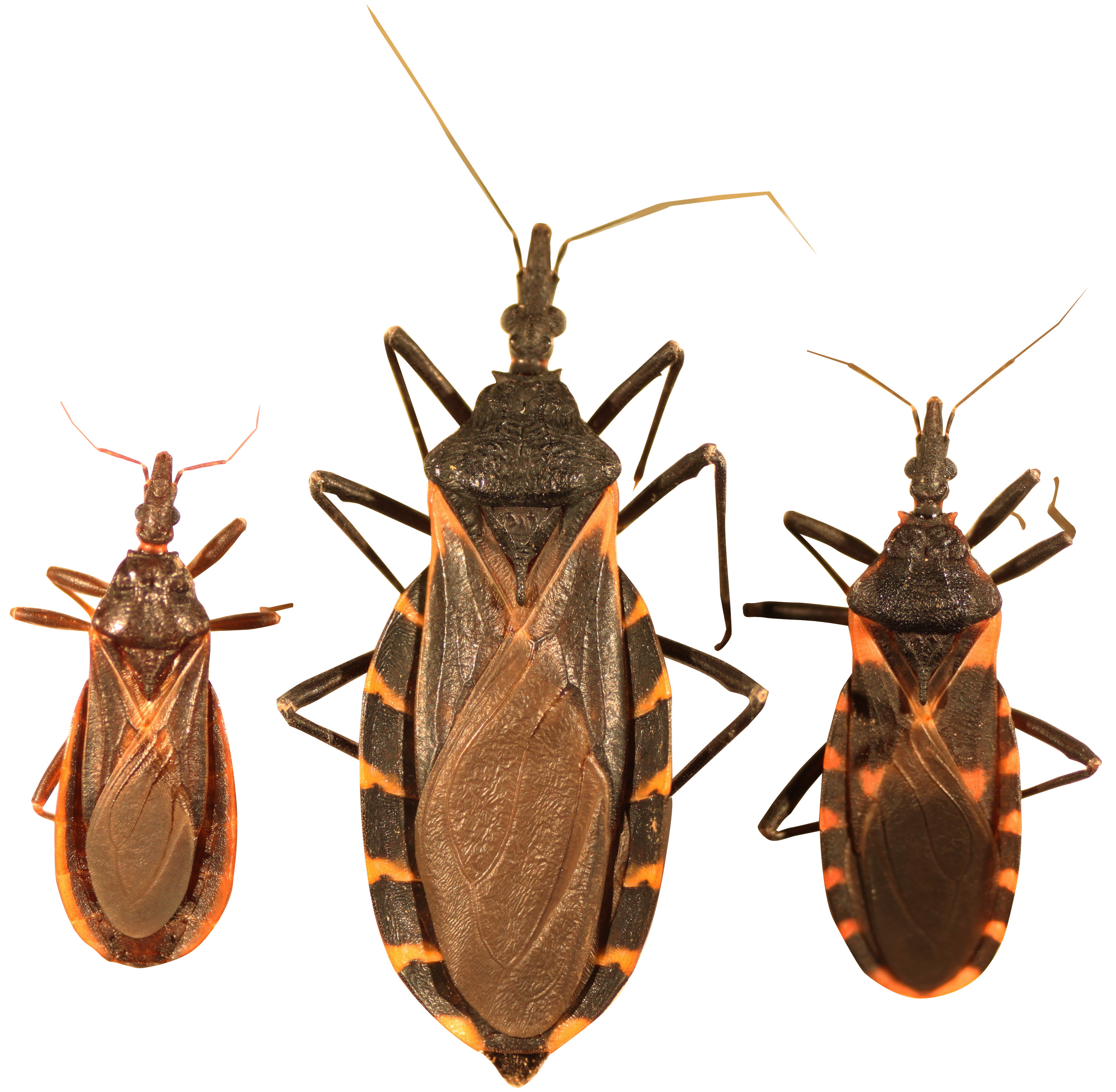
- (Left to right) Triatoma protracta, the most common species in the western U.S.; Triatoma gerstaeckeri, the most common species in Texas; Triatoma sanguisuga, the most common species in the eastern U.S.

Scientific classification
- Kingdom: Animalia
- Phylum: Arthropoda
- Clade: Pancrustacea
- Class: Insecta
- Order: Hemiptera
- Suborder: Heteroptera
- Family: Reduviidae
- Tribe: Triatomini
- Genus: Triatoma; Laporte, 1832

Species
- See text.

= Triatoma =

Genus of true bugs

Triatoma is a genus of assassin bug in the subfamily Triatominae (kissing bugs). The members of Triatoma (like all members of Triatominae) are blood-sucking insects that can transmit serious diseases, such as Chagas disease. Their saliva may also trigger allergic reactions in sensitive individuals, up to and including severe anaphylactic shock.

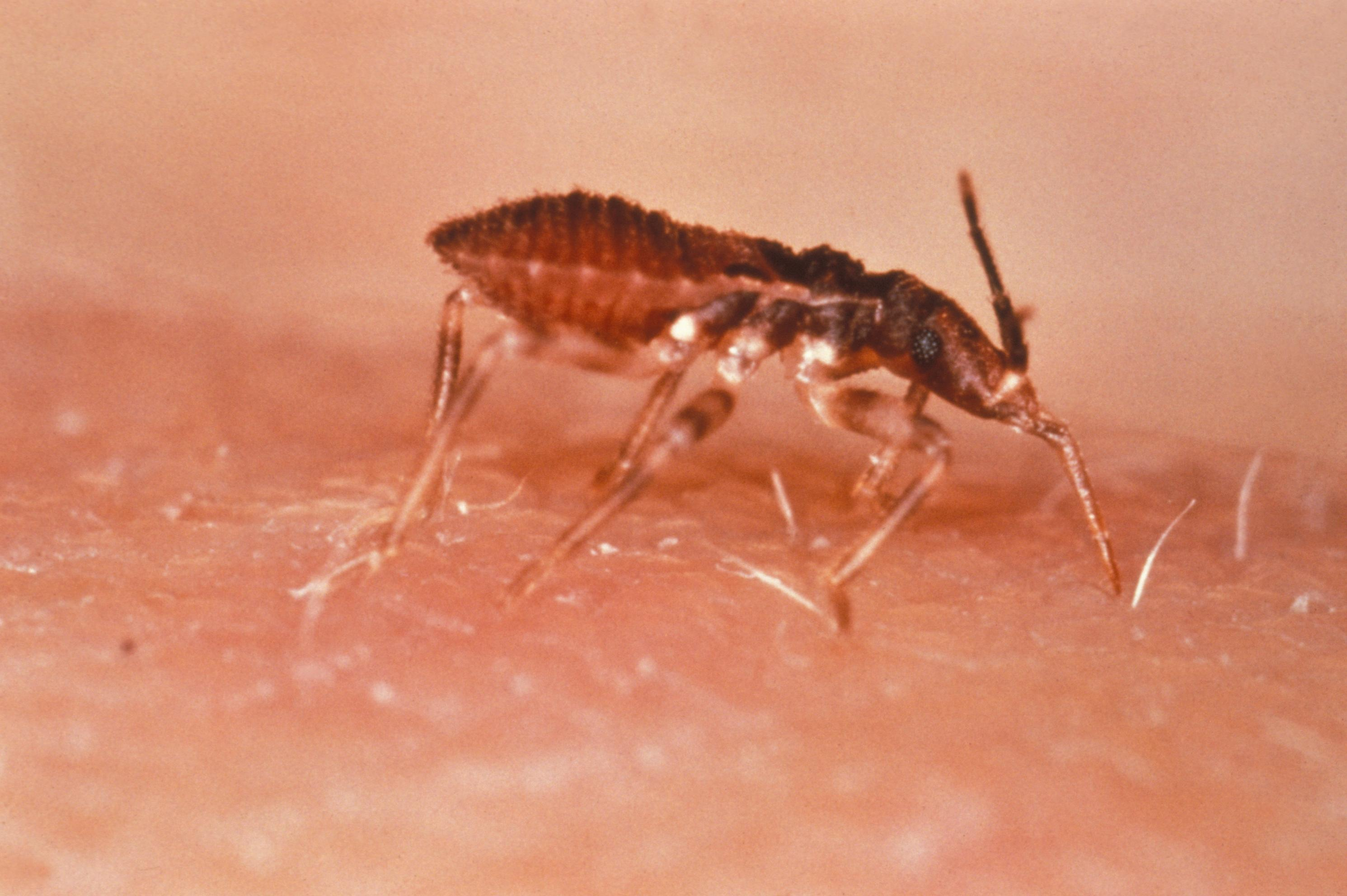
Triatoma infestans

== Species ==
These are species according to reliable sources. While most species are found in the New World, a few are known from the Old World. NOTE: The designation (Tc) signifies that the species is associated with Trypanosoma cruzi.

- Triatoma amicitiae Lent, 1951
- Triatoma arthurneivai Lent & Martins, 1940
- Triatoma bahiensis Sherlock & Serafim, 1967
- Triatoma baratai Carcavallo & Jurberg, 2000
- Triatoma barberi Usinger, 1939
- Triatoma bolivari Carcavallo, Martínez & Pelaez, 1984
- Triatoma boliviana Avendaño, 2007
- Triatoma bouvieri Larrousse, 1924
- Triatoma brailovskyi Martínez, Carcavallo & Pelaez, 1984
- Triatoma brasiliensis Neiva, 1911
- Triatoma breyeri Del Ponte, 1929, possible synonym of Mepraia breyeri
- Triatoma carcavalloi Jurberg, Rocha & Lent, 1998
- Triatoma carrioni Larrousse, 1926
- Triatoma cavernicola Else & Cheong, 1977
- Triatoma circummaculata (Stål, 1859)
- Triatoma costalimai Verano & Galvão, 1959
- Triatoma deaneorum Galvão, Souza & Lima, 1967
- Triatoma delpontei Romaña & Abalos, 1947
- Triatoma dimidiata (Latreille, 1811) (Tc) [important vector in parts of Mexico, Central America, Colombia and Ecuador].
- Triatoma dispar Lent, 1950
- Triatoma garciabesi Carcavallo, 1967
- Triatoma gerstaeckeri (Stål, 1859)
- Triatoma gomeznunezi Martínez, Carcavallo & Jurberg, 1994
- Triatoma guasayana Wygodzinsky & Abalos, 1949
- Triatoma guazu Lent & Wygodzinsky, 1979
- Triatoma hegneri Mazzotti, 1940
- Triatoma huehuetenanguensis Lima-Cordón, 2019 (Tc)
- Triatoma incrassata Usinger, 1939
- Triatoma indictiva Neiva, 1912
- Triatoma infestans (Klug, 1834)
- Triatoma jatai Gonçalves, 2013
- Triatoma juazeirensis Costa & Felix, 2007
- Triatoma jurbergi Carcavallo, Galvão & Lent, 1998
- Triatoma klugi Carcavallo, Jurberg, Lent & Galvão, 2001
- Triatoma lecticularia (Stål, 1859)
- Triatoma lenti Sherlock & Serafim, 1967
- Triatoma leopoldi (Schouteden, 1933)
- Triatoma limai Del Ponte, 1929
- Triatoma maculata (Erichson, 1848)
- Triatoma matogrossensis Leite & Barbosa, 1953
- Triatoma melanocephala Neiva & Pinto, 1923
- Triatoma mexicana (Herrich-Schaeffer, 1848)
- Triatoma migrans Breddin, 1903
- Triatoma mopan Dorn, 2018 (Tc)
- Triatoma neotomae Neiva, 1911
- Triatoma nigromaculata (Stål, 1872)
- Triatoma nitida Usinger, 1939
- Triatoma oliveirai (Neiva, Pinto & Lent, 1939)
- Triatoma pallidipennis Stål, 1872 (Tc)
- Triatoma patagonica Del Ponte, 1929
- Triatoma peninsularis Usinger, 1940
- Triatoma petrochiae Pinto & Barreto, 1925
- Triatoma pintodiasi Jurberg, Cunha & Rocha, 2013
- Triatoma platensis Neiva, 1913
- Triatoma protracta (Uhler, 1894) (western conenose)
- Triatoma pseudomaculata Correa & Espínola, 1964
- Triatoma pugasi Lent, 1953
- Triatoma recurva (Stål, 1868)
- Triatoma rubida (Uhler, 1894)
- Triatoma rubrofasciata (De Geer, 1773)
- Triatoma rubrovaria (Blanchard, 1843)
- Triatoma ryckmani Zeledón & Ponce, 1972
- Triatoma sanguisuga (Leconte, 1856) (eastern blood-sucking conenose)
- Triatoma sherlocki Papa, Jurberg, Carcavallo, Cerqueira & Barata, 2002
- Triatoma sinaloensis Ryckman, 1962
- Triatoma sinica Hsiao, 1965
- Triatoma sordida (Stal, 1859)
- Triatoma tibiamaculata (Pinto, 1926)
- Triatoma vandae Carcavallo, Jurberg, Rocha, Galvão, Noireau & Lent, 2002
- Triatoma venosa (Stal, 1872)
- Triatoma vitticeps (Stål, 1859)
- Triatoma williami Galvão, Souza & Lima, 1965
- Triatoma wygodzinskyi Lent, 1951

Fossil taxa:

- †Triatoma dominicana Poinar, 2005
