= Triatoma juazeirensis =

Scientific classification
- Domain: Eukaryota
- Kingdom: Animalia
- Phylum: Arthropoda
- Class: Insecta
- Order: Hemiptera
- Suborder: Heteroptera
- Family: Reduviidae
- Genus: Triatoma
- Species: T. juazeirensis

Binomial name
- Triatoma juazeirensis Costa & Felix, 2007

Species of true bug

Triatoma juazeirensis is an assassin bug, a Chagas disease vector which occurs in the State of Bahia, Brazil. It is found in natural and artificial environments infesting mainly the peridomiciliary areas but it may also colonize the intradomicile. T. juazeirensis can be distinguished from the other members of the brasiliensis complex by its entire dark pronotum and legs.
