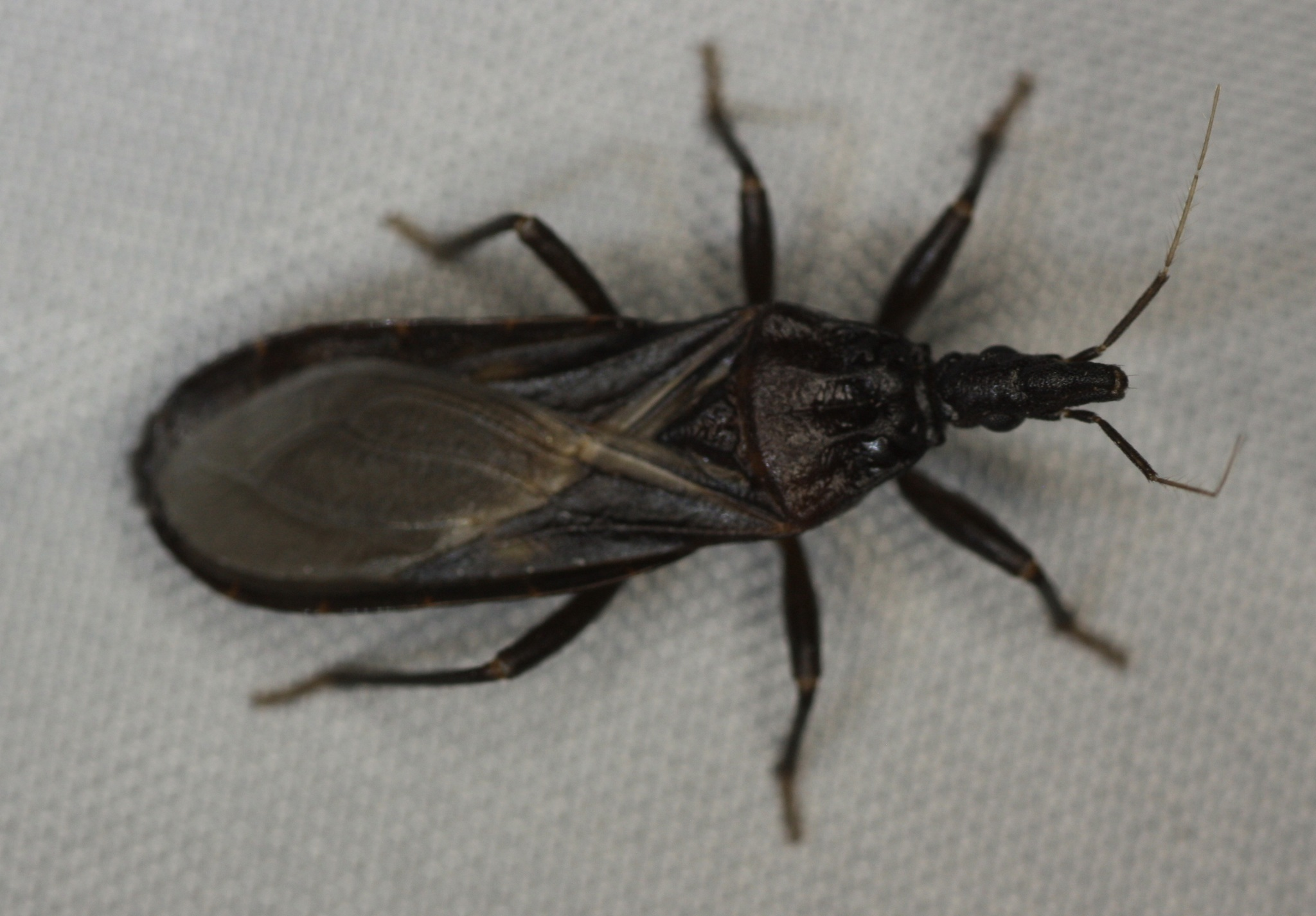

Scientific classification
- Domain: Eukaryota
- Kingdom: Animalia
- Phylum: Arthropoda
- Class: Insecta
- Order: Hemiptera
- Suborder: Heteroptera
- Family: Reduviidae
- Genus: Triatoma
- Species: T. protracta

Binomial name
- Triatoma protracta Uhler, 1894

= Triatoma protracta =

Blood-sucking bug, spreading disease

Triatoma protracta is a species of bugs in the family Reduviidae. It is known commonly as the western bloodsucking conenose. It is distributed in the western United States and Mexico.

This species and other "kissing bugs" are vectors of Trypanosoma cruzi, the protozoan that causes Chagas disease.

This species is between 0.5 and 0.75 inches long. It is dark brown to black in color with a lighter margin along the abdomen. The wings lie flat across the back. The "beak" has three segments and curls beneath the head. The nymph is similar in appearance but it is smaller and lacks wings.

This insect and others of its genus live in the nests of animals such as pack rats (genus Neotoma). They become pests when they invade houses. They bite humans, producing irritation to the skin and sometimes severe allergic reactions. The insects are also known to have three subspecies including:

- T. protracta woodi
- T. protracta protracta
- T. protracta navajoensis
