= Triatoma rubida =

Scientific classification
- Domain: Eukaryota
- Kingdom: Animalia
- Phylum: Arthropoda
- Class: Insecta
- Order: Hemiptera
- Suborder: Heteroptera
- Family: Reduviidae
- Genus: Triatoma
- Species: T. rubida

Binomial name
- Triatoma rubida (Uhler, 1894)

Species of true bug

Triatoma rubida is a species of kissing bug in the family Reduviidae. It is found in Central America and North America.

== Subspecies ==
These two subspecies belong to the species Triatoma rubida:

- Triatoma rubida rubida (Uhler, 1894)
- Triatoma rubida uhleri Neiva, 1911
