= Triatoma neotomae =

Scientific classification
- Domain: Eukaryota
- Kingdom: Animalia
- Phylum: Arthropoda
- Class: Insecta
- Order: Hemiptera
- Suborder: Heteroptera
- Family: Reduviidae
- Genus: Triatoma
- Species: T. neotomae

Binomial name
- Triatoma neotomae Neiva, 1911

Species of true bug

Triatoma neotomae is a species of kissing bug in the family Reduviidae. It is found in Central America and North America.
