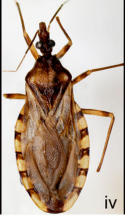

Scientific classification
- Kingdom: Animalia
- Phylum: Arthropoda
- Clade: Pancrustacea
- Class: Insecta
- Order: Hemiptera
- Suborder: Heteroptera
- Family: Reduviidae
- Genus: Triatoma
- Species: T. sordida

Binomial name
- Triatoma sordida (Stål, 1859)

= Triatoma sordida =

Species of true bug

Triatoma sordida is an assassin bug (Family Reduviidae) within the genus Triatoma. This species consists of three subspecies. Also referred to as kissing bugs, T. sordida are most well known for their role as a secondary vector of Chagas disease. Inhabiting warm, dry climates, T. sordida are widely distributed throughout South America, occupying houses, farming structures, and wild habitats. Pest control is currently focused on insecticide application. However, biological controls utilizing fungi appear promising.

== Phylogeny ==
The genus Triatoma currently consists of eight complexes and nine subcomplexes. T. sordida belongs to the T. sordida subcomplex, which consists of six species. Within the T. sordida subcomplex, there are three variants of T. sordida species, T. sordida sensu stricto, T. sordida La Paz and T. sordida Argentina. The former, may be found in Bolivia, Brazil, Argentina, and Paraguay, while T. sordida Argentina can be found in its namesake geographical region.

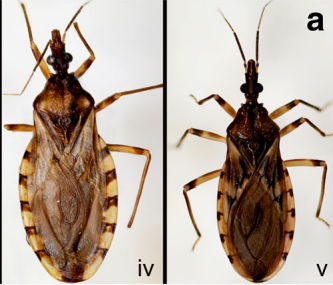
Figure 1. T. sordida Argentina (left) and T. sordida sensu stricto (right)

== Reproduction and life cycle ==
The dispersal ability of this species increases the difficulty in which reproduction can be studied. However, researchers understand that females are inseminated by male counterparts, then females choose a suitable location for oviposition. The eggs then incubate for approximately 23 days, emerging as first instar nymphs at approximately 24 days. The average life cycle of T. sordida from egg to adult is approximately 213 days, consisting of the egg stage, five nymphal stages, and the adult stage.T. sordida are hemimetabolous and reproduce many times per lifetime.

== Morphology ==
=== General ===
Triatoma sordida have sucking mouthparts used to gain external access to their blood host and two sets of membranous, overlapping wings. In addition, stridulation, or sound production, may be achieved by rubbing the proboscis against a grooved organ located on its ventral surface adjacent to the head. Sexual dimorphism is noted in this species, as males and females differ in sensilla pattern on their antennae and females are often longer.

=== Female external reproductive anatomy ===
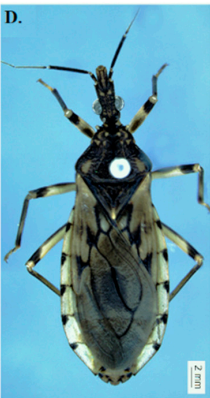
Figure 2. T. sordida sensu stricto Female

Little work has been dedicated to the characterization of female genitals, as it was incorrectly thought that the structures were not pertinent to species identification. Recent work utilizing scanning electron microscopy (SEM) technology, however, has allowed researchers to photograph and characterize external anatomy to assist in species identification. When viewed from above, the female genitals of Triatoma sordida sensu stricto take a trapezoidal shape (Figure 3). When examining the last-most segment, near the posterior portion of the genitals, a rounded shape is taken. However, when viewed from behind, this same structure appears almost circular.

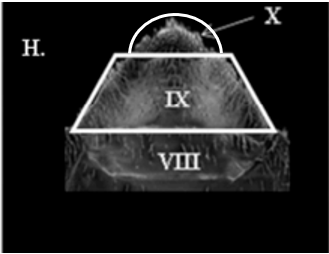
Figure 3. SEM photograph of female T. sordida external genitals

=== Male internal reproductive anatomy ===
The male internal reproductive components generally consist of two systems, the reproductive and accessory reproductive organs. The former include seminal vesicles and the testis, where sperm is held, while the latter consists of four glands that connect to the seminal vesicle.

== Habitat ==
Individuals of this subcomplex may be found in wild, domestic, and peridomestic habitats. Species within T. sordida have a large geographical range which they inhabit, including Argentina, Bolivia, Brazil, and Paraguay. There is noted preference for hot, dry climates, with organisms of this species occupying dead, dried out trees, chicken coops, and rural houses.

== Vectors of disease ==
The Triatoma genera are important vectors of Chagas disease, transmitting the parasite Trypanosoma cruzi via their frass. When bitten, it is common that a person will accidentally smear the feces into the open wound. However, transmission is possible through blood products, vertical transmission, and contaminated food.

Due to its frequent occurrence with avian hosts, it was believed that T. sordida prefer such. However, studies confirm the species' preference for mammalian hosts. Although, it was found that individuals who fed on avian hosts lived longer, this perceived cost is outweighed by the fitness benefits of mammalian blood, as females who fed on mouse blood had higher fecundity.

== Control ==
Laboratory studies confirm the success of a pyrethroid insecticide, called deltamethrin, as a control for T. sordida, as long as the treatment is applied twice. The efficacy of insecticides targeted toward T. infestans on T. sordida has also been tested, proving a decrement to T. sordida populations. However, shortly thereafter T. sordida populations recovered. As a result of findings of a new fungal species of Evlachovaea on deceased Triatoma sordida, researchers investigated the viability of this fungi as a biological control agent. Their findings suggest that Evlachovaea can increase mortality of third-instar Triatoma sordida nymphs, but only if humidity is favourable to fungal production.
