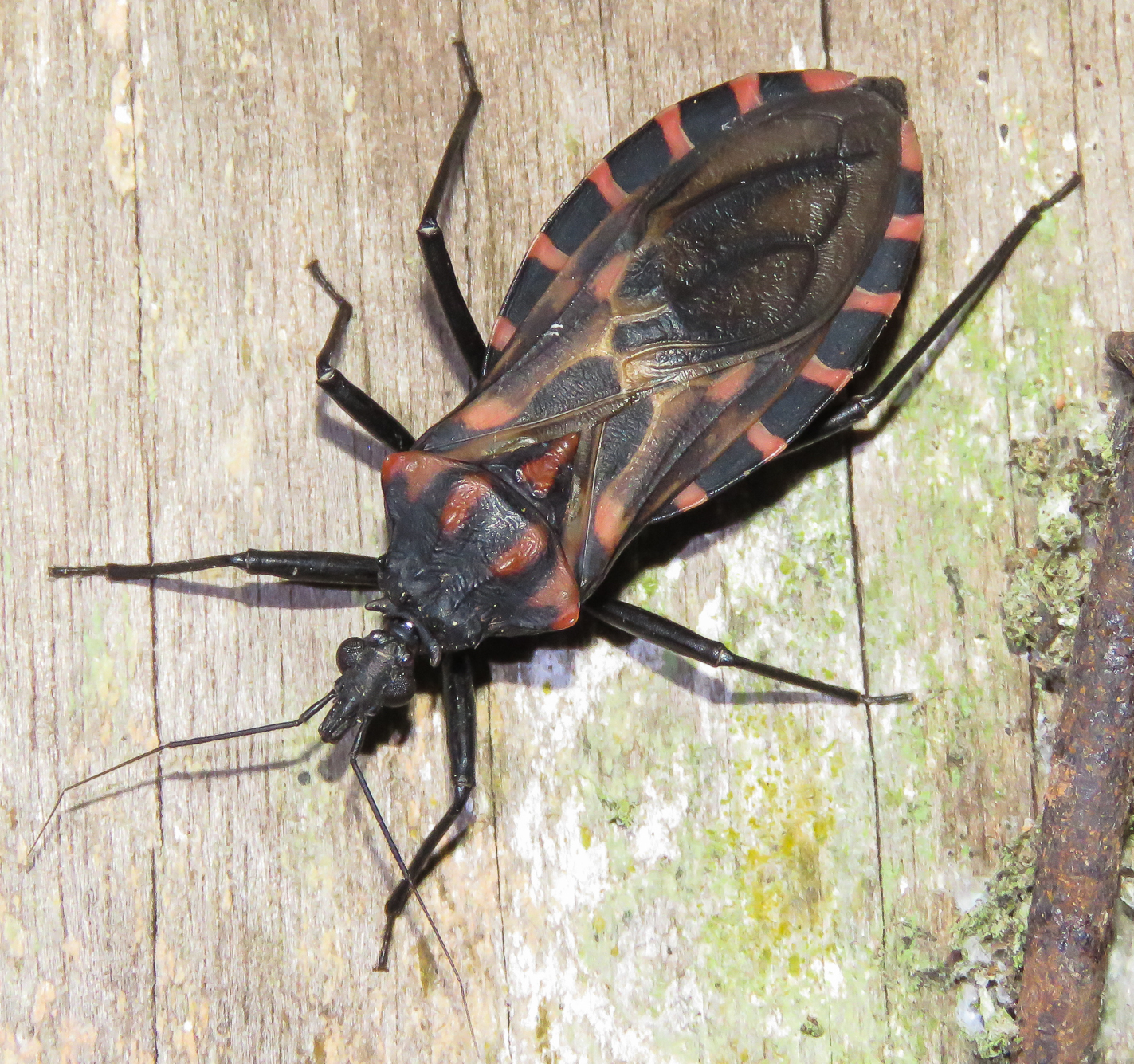

Scientific classification
- Kingdom: Animalia
- Phylum: Arthropoda
- Class: Insecta
- Order: Hemiptera
- Suborder: Heteroptera
- Family: Reduviidae
- Genus: Panstrongylus
- Species: P. megistus

Binomial name
- Panstrongylus megistus Burmeister, 1835

= Panstrongylus megistus =

Species of blood-drinking insect

Panstrongylus megistus is a blood-drinking insect in the subfamily Triatominae. It is found in the Guianas, Brazil, Bolivia, Paraguay, Uruguay and Argentina. It is an important vector of Trypanosoma cruzi (the causative agent of Chagas disease), found particularly in Brazil. Besides humans, P. megistus is known to feed on birds, rodents, horses, dogs, opossums and bats.

P. megistus is frequently found in domestic dwellings in Brazil, while in other countries it is largely a wild species. Within Brazil, the P. megistus's range stretches from the northeast to the south of the country, corresponding roughly with the Atlantic Forest region, though the species also occupies parts of the caatinga and cerrado ecoregions. The states of Bahia and Minas Gerais have the highest populations of P. megistus in Brazil. In southern parts of the country, domestic colonization is rare.

The species was described in 1835 by Hermann Burmeister, who termed it Conorhinus megistus. It was identified as a vector for Chagas disease in Carlos Chagas's original 1909 description of the condition. The insects are typically black in colour with red markings.
