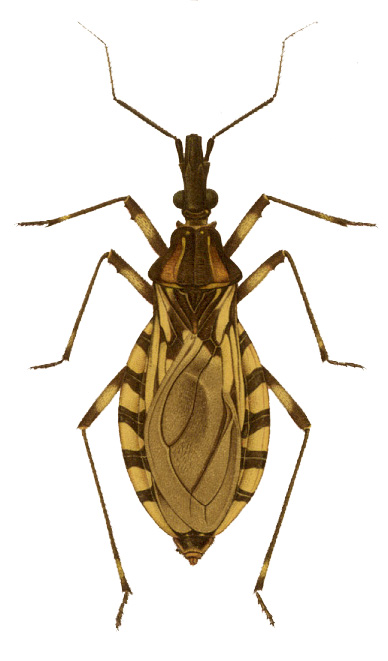

Scientific classification
- Kingdom: Animalia
- Phylum: Arthropoda
- Clade: Pancrustacea
- Class: Insecta
- Order: Hemiptera
- Suborder: Heteroptera
- Family: Reduviidae
- Genus: Triatoma
- Species: T. brasiliensis

Binomial name
- Triatoma brasiliensis Neiva, 1911

= Triatoma brasiliensis =

Species of true bug

Triatoma brasiliensis is now considered the most important Chagas disease vector in the semiarid areas of northeastern Brazil. T. brasiliensis occurs in 12 Brazilian states, including Maranhão, Piauí, Ceará, Rio Grande do Norte, and Paraíba.

T. brasiliensis is native to this part of Brazil, and thus persists in the natural environment. This species of Kissing Bug has the greatest potential to spread Chagas disease due to its distribution over large areas where numerous people reside. Triatoma species are commonly called Kissing Bugs because they bite around the mouth where skin is thinner. T. brasiliensis also has the greatest potential to colonize new areas and spread throughout northeastern parts of Brazil. This makes control problematic (see #Control below).

== Life Cycle ==
Female triatomids deposit small eggs in secluded areas. After 8 to 10 days the first of five nymph stages emerges. A full blood meal is required before continuing onto the next nymph state. The cycle from egg to adult can take up to two years in nature. Adults are obligate blood feeders that feed primarily at night and hide during the day. T. brasiliensis becomes infected with Trypanosoma cruzi when they feed on infected hosts such as humans, dogs, cats, and other mammals. T. brasiliensis then transfers T. cruzi through feces on the new host's skin. It is not known how long the adults can survive in the wild but an infected bug can serve as a vector for up to three years.

== Control ==
The current control method of Chagas disease is to control the vector population. The control strategies against this vector are very complex due to its capacity to infest natural and artificial environments presenting high levels of population density. Simple spraying methods are not as effective for T. brasiliensis as they are for other Triatoma species. Suggested methods of control currently include spraying more frequently with higher surveillance or to devise a strategy that attacks T. brasiliensis in sylvatic foci such as spraying palm trees.

== Notes ==
- B. F. Eldridge, J. D. Edman. Medical Entomology: A Textbook on Public Health and Veterinary Problems Caused by Arthropods. Great Briton: MPG Books Limited, Bodmin, Cornwall, 2004. Print.
- Costa, J; Almeida, CE; Dotson, EM; Lins, A; Vinhaes, M; Silveira, AC; Beard, CB (2003a). "The epidemiologic importance of Triatoma brasiliensis as a Chagas disease vector in Brazil: a revision of domiciliary captures during 1993-1999". Mem Inst Oswaldo Cruz. 98 (4): 443–449. doi:10.1590/s0074-02762003000400002. hdl:1807/8079. PMID 12937751.
- Costa, J.; Dornak, L.; Almeida, C.; Peterson, A. (2014). "Distributional potential of the Triatoma brasiliensis species complex at present and under scenarios of future climate conditions". Parasites & Vectors. 7: 238. doi:10.1186/1756-3305-7-238. PMC 4046994. PMID 24886587.
- Costa, J; Almeida, CE; Dujardin, JP; Beard, CB (2003b). "Crossing experiments detect genetic incompatibility among populations of Triatoma brasiliensis Neiva, 1911 (Heteroptera, Reduviidae, Triatominae)". Mem Inst Oswaldo Cruz. 98 (5): 637–639. doi:10.1590/s0074-02762003000500009. hdl:1807/8114. PMID 12973530.
- Lent, H; Wygodzinsky, P (1979). "Revision of the Triatominae (Hemiptera, Reduviidae), and their significance as vectors of Chagas disease". Bull Am Mus Nat Hist. 163: 123–520.
- Diotaiuti, L; Faria-Filho, OF; Carneiro, FC; Dias, JC; Pires, HH; Schofield, CJ (2000). "Aspectos operacionais do controle de Triatoma brasiliensis". Cad Saúde Pública. 16 (Supl. 2): 61–67. doi:10.1590/S0102-311X2000000800006.
- Miles, Michael A; Feliciangeli, M Dora; Antonieta (2003). "American Trypanosomiasis (Chagas' Disease) and the Role of Molecular Epidemiology in Guiding Control Strategies". British Medical Journal. 326 (7404): 1444–1448. doi:10.1136/bmj.326.7404.1444. PMC 1126319. PMID 12829559.
