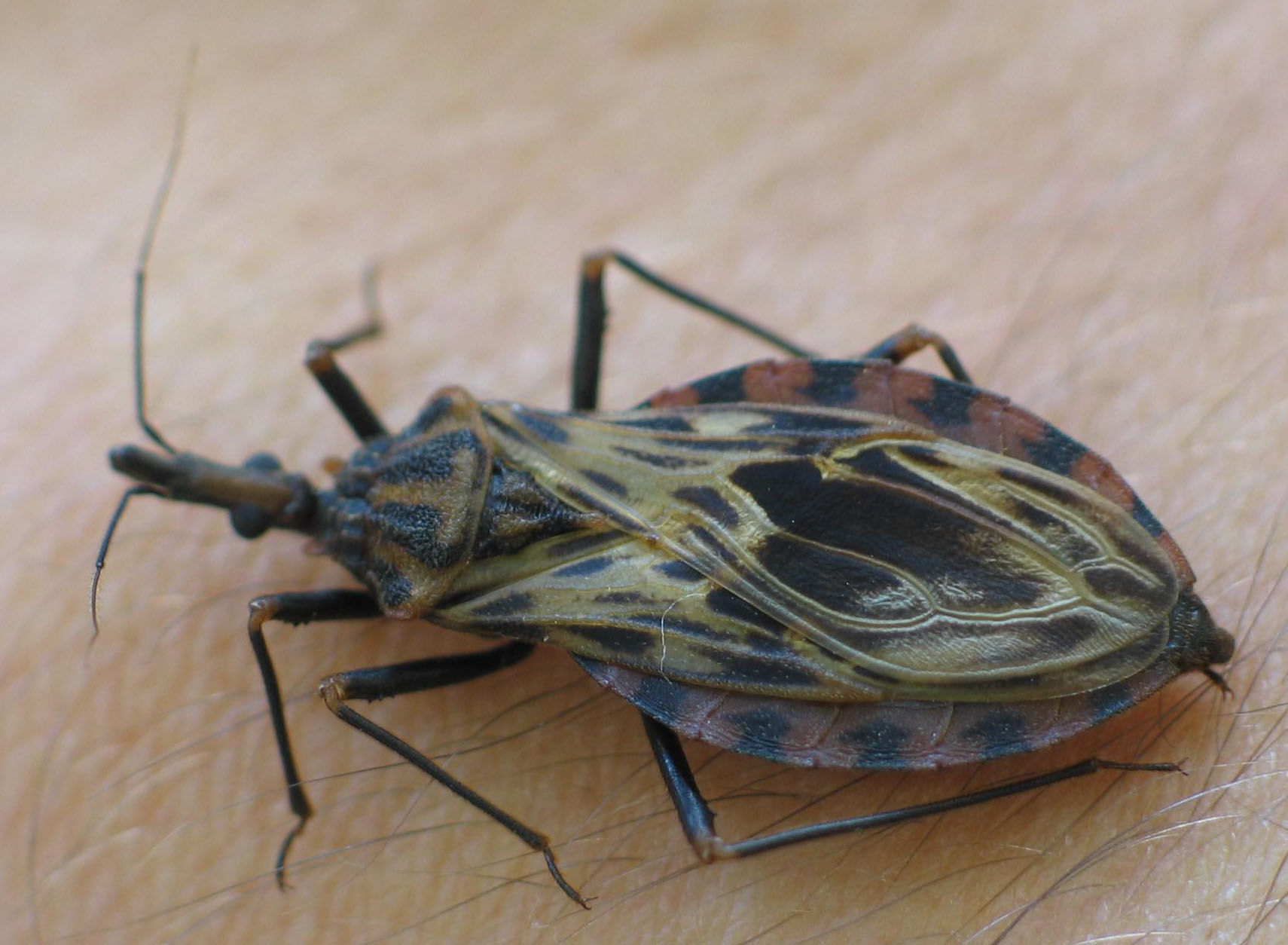

Scientific classification
- Kingdom: Animalia
- Phylum: Arthropoda
- Clade: Pancrustacea
- Class: Insecta
- Order: Hemiptera
- Suborder: Heteroptera
- Family: Reduviidae
- Genus: Triatoma
- Species: T. nigromaculata

Binomial name
- Triatoma nigromaculata Stål, 1859

= Triatoma nigromaculata =

Species of true bug

Triatoma nigromaculata is a sylvatic species of insect usually found in hollow trees, in vertebrate nests on trees and occasionally in human dwellings. It usually lives in relatively humid forests at high altitudes on mountain regions and foot hills (300 to 1700 m above sea level). As all members of the subfamily Triatominae, T. nigromaculata is a blood-sucking bug and a potential vector of Chagas disease. This species is distributed mainly in Venezuela (Aragua, Barinas, Bolívar, Cojedes, Delta Amacuro, Distrito Capital, Lara, Mérida, Monagas, Portuguesa, Sucre and Yaracuy), but some specimens have also been found in Perú and Colombia (Cauca).
