= Triatoma platensis =

Scientific classification
- Kingdom: Animalia
- Phylum: Arthropoda
- Clade: Pancrustacea
- Class: Insecta
- Order: Hemiptera
- Suborder: Heteroptera
- Family: Reduviidae
- Genus: Triatoma
- Species: T. platensis

Binomial name
- Triatoma platensis Neiva, 1913

Species of true bug

Triatoma platensis is an ornitophilic species of triatomine in the family Reduviidae. It is found in Argentina, Bolivia, Brazil, Paraguay and Uruguay. The species was originally described by Neiva in 1913. Its presence in southern Brazil was documented in 1991, when specimens were reported from the state of Rio Grande do Sul. This record confirmed that the species occurs within Brazilian territory as part of its broader South American distribution. T. platensis is recognized as a distinct taxon in both the Integrated Taxonomic Information System and the Global Biodiversity Information Facility. These databases place the species within the genus Triatoma, a group of reduviid bugs belonging to the subfamily Triatominae.
