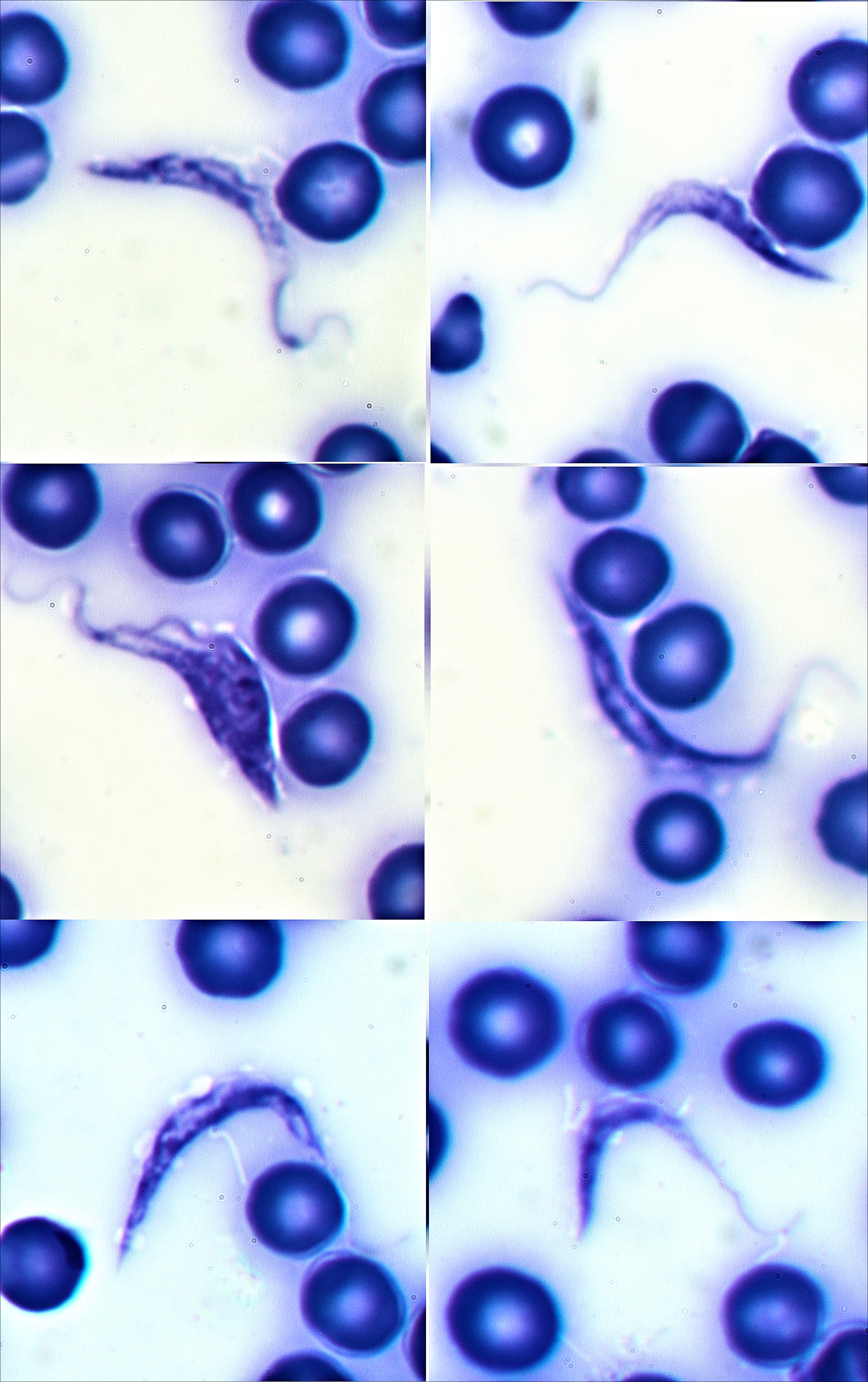
- Trypanosoma cruzi in human blood Giemsa stain. They are typically seen as a C-shape and have a more pronounced kinetoplast compared to other species.

Scientific classification
- Domain: Eukaryota
- Supergroup: Discoba
- Phylum: Euglenozoa
- Class: Kinetoplastea
- Order: Trypanosomatida
- Family: Trypanosomatidae
- Genus: Trypanosoma
- Subgenus: Schizotrypanum
- Species: T. cruzi

Binomial name
- Trypanosoma cruzi Chagas, 1909

= Trypanosoma cruzi =

Species of parasitic euglenoids (protozoans)

Trypanosoma cruzi is a species of parasitic kinetoplastid which causes Chagas disease. Among the protozoa, the trypanosomes characteristically bore tissue in another organism and feed on blood (primarily) and also lymph. This behaviour causes disease or the likelihood of disease that varies with the organism: Chagas disease and sleeping sickness in humans, dourine and surra in horses, and a brucellosis-like disease in cattle. Parasites need a host body and the haematophagous insect triatomine (descriptions "assassin bug", "cone-nose bug", and "kissing bug") is the major vector in accord with a mechanism of infection. The triatomine likes the nests of vertebrate animals for shelter, where it bites and sucks blood for food. Individual triatomines infected with protozoa from other contact with animals transmit trypanosomes when the triatomine deposits its faeces on the host's skin surface while blood feeding. Penetration of the infected faeces is further facilitated by the scratching of the bite area by the human or animal host.

== Etymology ==
The specific name "cruzi" is an honor to Brazilian scientist Oswaldo Cruz, who was the teacher of the discoverer: Carlos Chagas.

== Life cycle ==
The Trypanosoma cruzi life cycle starts in an animal reservoir, usually mammals, wild or domestic, including humans. A triatomine bug serves as the vector. While taking a blood meal from an infected host, it ingests T. cruzi. In the triatomine bug (the principal species of which in terms of parasite transmission to humans being Triatoma infestans) the parasite goes into the epimastigote stage, making it possible to reproduce. After reproducing through binary fission, the epimastigotes move onto the rectal cell wall of the kissing bug, where they become infectious. Infectious T. cruzi are called metacyclic trypomastigotes. When the triatomine bug subsequently takes a blood meal from a host, it defecates—its waste containing T. cruzi propagation stages. As a result, Trumper and Gorla 1991 find transmission success centers around the triatomine's defecation behaviors. Alternatively, in nature and in most recent cases of epidemiological outbreaks, infection occurs through the oral ingestion of parasites (mainly through a lack of infected food disinfection in the case of human infection). The trypomastigotes are in the feces and are capable of swimming into the host's cells using flagella, a characteristic swimming tail dominant in the Euglenoid class of protists. The trypomastigotes enter the host through the bite wound or by crossing mucous membranes. The host cells contain macromolecules such as laminin, thrombospondin, heparin sulphate, and fibronectin that cover their surface. These macromolecules are essential for adhesion between parasite and host and for the process of host invasion by the parasite. The trypomastigotes must cross a network of proteins that line the exterior of the host cells in order to make contact and invade the host cells. The molecules and proteins on the cytoskeleton of the cell also bind to the surface of the parasite and initiate host invasion.

== Life cycle forms of Trypanosoma cruzi ==
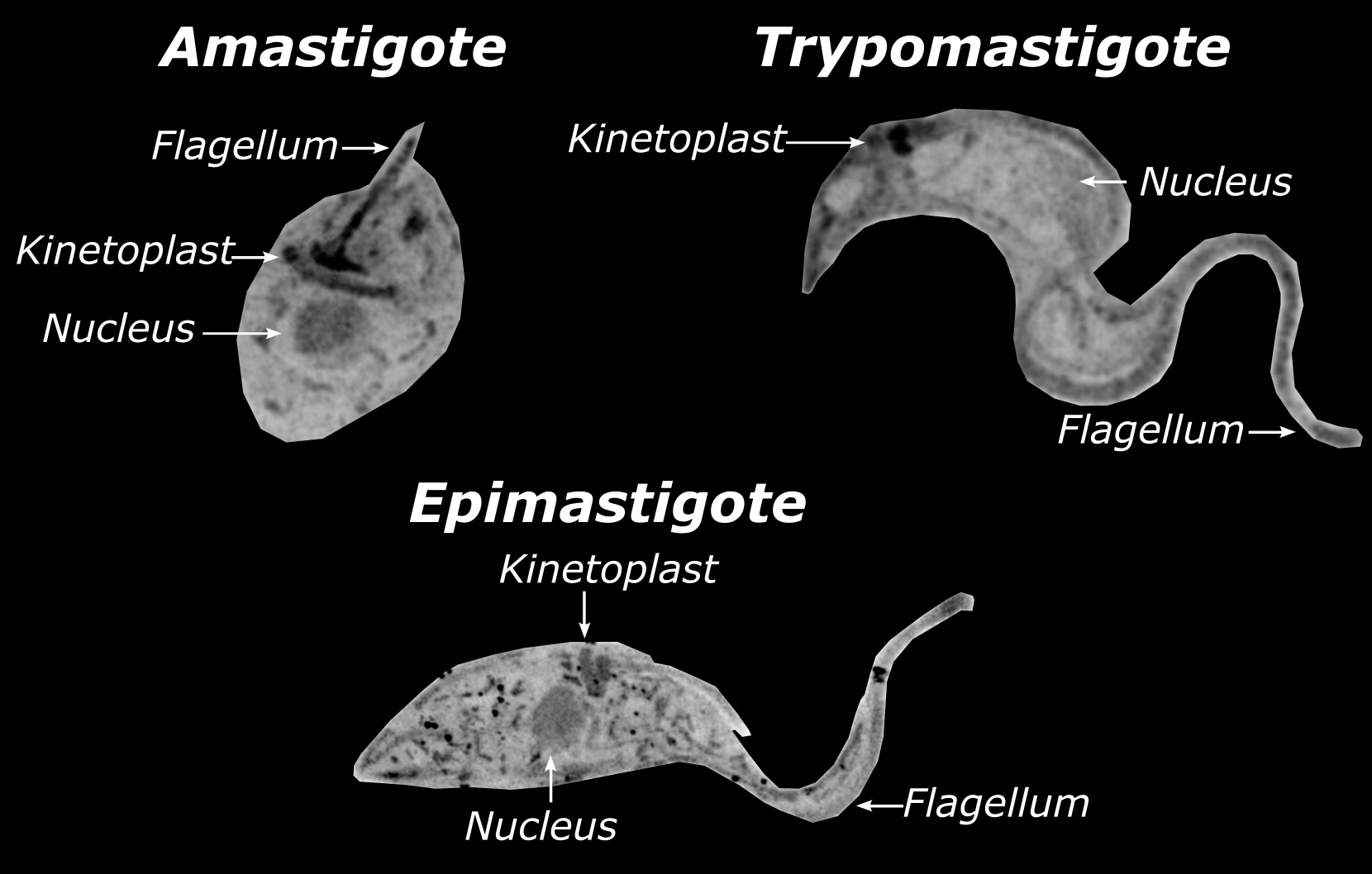

Trypanosoma cruzi exhibits three major morphological forms during its complex life cycle: epimastigote, trypomastigote, and amastigote stages. The epimastigote form develops and multiplies in the midgut of the triatomine vector. It is an elongated, flagellated stage that divides by binary fission. Toward the end of the insect phase, epimastigotes migrate to the hindgut and differentiate into metacyclic trypomastigotes, which are the infective, non-dividing forms excreted with the insect’s feces. After entering the mammalian host through mucous membranes or skin lesions, metacyclic trypomastigotes invade host cells and transform into amastigotes. Amastigotes are intracellular, rounded forms with a short flagellum; they multiply in the cytoplasm by binary fission. Following several replication cycles, they differentiate into cell-derived trypomastigotes (also known as bloodstream trypomastigotes), which are released when the host cell ruptures. These trypomastigotes circulate in the bloodstream and can infect new cells or be ingested by another triatomine, where they revert to epimastigotes, completing the cycle.

== Pathophysiology ==
Trypanosomiasis in humans progresses with the development of the trypanosome into a trypomastigote in the blood and into an amastigote in tissues. As the infection progresses, the number of infected cells increases, as well as the number of amastigotes per infected cell (APC). If the average of APC is one or close to one, the infection has just begun. A higher APC means that amastigotes have started to replicate.

The acute form of trypanosomiasis is usually unnoticed, although it may manifest itself as a localized swelling at the site of entry. In this form appears elevated parasitism, myocarditis, and changes in the myocardial gene expression. The chronic form may develop 30 to 40 years after infection and affect internal organs (e.g., the heart, the oesophagus, the colon, and the peripheral nervous system). Affected people may die from heart failure and severe heart lesions.

Acute cases are treated with nifurtimox and benznidazole, but no effective therapy for chronic cases is currently known.

=== Cardiac manifestations ===
Researchers of Chagas disease have demonstrated several processes that occur with all cardiomyopathies. The first event is an inflammatory response. Following inflammation, cellular damage occurs. Finally, in the body's attempt to recover from the cellular damage, fibrosis begins in the cardiac tissue.

Another cardiomyopathy found in nearly all cases of chronic Chagas disease is thromboembolic syndrome. Thromboembolism describes thrombosis, the formation of a clot, and its main complication is embolism, the carrying of a clot to a distal section of a vessel and causing blockage there. This occurrence contributes to the death of a patient by four means: arrhythmias, stasis secondary to cardiac dilation, mural endocarditis, and cardiac fibrosis. These thrombi also affect other organs such as the brain, spleen and kidney.

==== Myocardial biochemical response ====
Subcellular findings in murine studies with induced T. cruzi infection revealed that the chronic state is associated with the persistent elevation of phosphorylated (activated) extracellular-signal-regulated kinase (ERK), AP-1, and NF-κB. Also, the mitotic regulator for G1 progression, cyclin D1 was found to be activated. Although there was no increase in any isoform of ERK, there was an increased concentration of phosphorylated ERK in mice infected with T. cruzi. It was found that within seven days the concentration of AP-1 was significantly higher in T. cruzi–infected mice when compared to the control. Elevated levels of NF-κB have also been found in myocardial tissue, with the highest concentrations being found in the vasculature. It was indicated through Western blot that cyclin D1 was upregulated from day 1 to day 60 post-infection. It was also indicated through immunohistochemical analysis that the areas that produced the most cyclin D1 were the vasculature and interstitial regions of the heart.

==== Rhythm abnormalities ====
Conduction abnormalities are also associated with T. cruzi. At the base of these conduction abnormalities is a depopulation of parasympathetic neuronal endings on the heart. Without proper parasympathetic innervations, one could expect to find not only chronotropic but also inotropic abnormalities. It is true that all inflammatory and non-inflammatory heart disease may display forms of parasympathetic denervation; this denervation presents in a descriptive fashion in Chagas disease. It has also been indicated that the loss of parasympathetic innervations can lead to sudden death due to a severe cardiac failure that occurs during the acute stage of infection.

Another conduction abnormality presented with chronic Chagas disease is a change in ventricular repolarization, which is represented on an electrocardiogram as the T-wave. This change in repolarization inhibits the heart from relaxing and properly entering diastole. Changes in the ventricular repolarization in Chagas disease are likely due to myocardial ischemia. This ischemia can also lead to fibrillation. This sign is usually observed in chronic Chagas disease and is considered a minor electromyocardiopathy.

==== Epicardial lesions ====
Villous plaque is characterized by exophytic epicardial thickening, meaning that the growth occurs at the border of the epicardium and not the center of mass. Unlike milk spots and chagasic rosary, inflammatory cells and vasculature are present in villous plaque. Since villous plaque contains inflammatory cells it is reasonable to suspect that these lesions are more recently formed than milk spots or chagasic rosary.

== Motility ==
When mammalian cells are present, trypomastigotes move in a sub diffusive fashion in short periods of time, but under control conditions their motion is diffusive.

Parasites increase their mean speed; they explore smaller areas at short time scales and show a preference to be located nearby cells' periphery. The extent of these changes depends on the cell type. Therefore, T. cruzi trypomastigotes can sense mammalian cells and modify their motility patterns to prepare themselves for infection.

=== Parasite reorientation ===
Epimastigotes, which are the culture forms of T. cruzi, swim in the direction of their flagellum, due to tip-to-base symmetrical flagellar beats, that are interrupted by base-to-tip highly asymmetric beats. Switching between both beating modes facilitates parasite reorientation, allowing many movements and trajectories. Epimastigote motility is characterized by alternation of quasi-rectilinear and restricted and complex paths.

== Invasion efficiency ==
The invasion efficiency is positively correlated with the average parasite mean speed, and negatively correlated with the mean square displacement (MSD). Therefore, the motility modifications undergone by the parasites in the presence of mammalian cells may be functionally related to the cell invasion process.

Moreover, different parasite strains infect different tissues with a variable invasion efficiency, due to the high genetic and phenotypic variability found among T. cruzi strains. T. cruzi trypomastigotes are capable of sensing mammalian cells to a different degree, depending on the cell type, and can modify their motility patterns to increase their invasion efficiency.

== Virulence chemistry ==
T. cruzi does not produce prostaglandins itself. Instead Pinge-Filho et al. 1999 finds that the parasite induces mice to overproduce 2-series prostaglandins themselves. These PG_{2}s are immunosuppressive and so aid in immune evasion.

Imipramines are trypanocidal. Doyle & Weinbach 1989 find imipramine and various of its derivatives – 3-Chlorimipramine, 2-Nitroimipramine, and 2-Nitrodesmethylimipramine – are trypanocidal in vitro. They find 2-Nitrodesmethylimipramine is the most effective among them.

== Epidemiology ==
T. cruzi transmission has been documented in the Southwestern U.S., and warming trends may allow vector species to move north. U.S. domestic and wild animals are reservoirs for T. cruzi. Triatomine species in the southern U.S. have taken human blood meals, but because triatomines do not favor typical U.S. housing, risk to the U.S. population is very low.

Chagas disease's geographical occurrence happens worldwide but high-risk individuals include those who don't have access to proper housing. Its reservoir is in wild animals but its vector is a kissing bug. This is a contagious disease and can be transmitted through a number of ways: congenital transmission, blood transfusion, organ transplantation, consumption of uncooked food that has been contaminated with feces from infected bugs, and accidental laboratory exposure.

Over 130 species of kissing bugs can transmit this parasite

Six taxonomic subunits are recognised.

New data in 2024 suggests the prevalence of Trypanosoma cruzi infection among solid organ transplant recipients in the U.S. is on the rise, highlighting the need for enhanced screening protocols. The research revealed that lung transplant recipients had the highest prevalence of positive serology at 21%, followed by heart recipients at 14%, compared to lower rates in liver (6%) and kidney (5%) transplant recipients.

== Clinical ==
The incubation period is five to fourteen days after a host comes in contact with feces. Chagas disease undergoes two phases, which are the acute and the chronic phase. The acute phase can last from two weeks to two months but can go unnoticed because symptoms are minor and short-lived. Symptoms of the acute phase include swelling, fever, fatigue, and diarrhea. The chronic phase causes digestive problems, constipation, heart failure, and pain in the abdomen.

Diagnostic methods include microscopic examination, serology, or the isolation of the parasite by inoculating blood into a guinea pig, mouse, or rat.

No vaccines are available. The most used method for epidemiological management and disease prevention resides within vector control, mainly by the use of insecticides and taking preventative measures such as applying bug repellent on the skin, wearing protective clothing, and staying in higher quality hotels when traveling. Investing in quality housing would be ideal to decrease risk of contracting this disease.

== Genetic exchange ==
Genetic exchange has been identified among field populations of T. cruzi. This process appears to involve genetic recombination as well as a meiotic mechanism. Despite the capability for sexual reproduction, natural populations of T. cruzi exhibit clonal population structures. It appears that frequent sexual reproduction events occur primarily between close relatives resulting in an apparent clonal population structure.

== See also ==
- List of parasites (human)
