= Pachylaelaps karawaiewi =

Scientific classification
- Domain: Eukaryota
- Kingdom: Animalia
- Phylum: Arthropoda
- Subphylum: Chelicerata
- Class: Arachnida
- Order: Mesostigmata
- Family: Pachylaelapidae
- Genus: Pachylaelaps
- Species: P. karawaiewi

Binomial name
- Pachylaelaps karawaiewi Berlese, 1920

Species of mite

Pachylaelaps karawaiewi is a species of mite in the family Pachylaelapidae. It is found in Europe.
