= E. nepalensis =

E. nepalensis may refer to:

- Ebertius nepalensis, a ground beetle
- Elaphoidella nepalensis, a freshwater copepod
- Elaphrolaelaps nepalensis, a mite with a single pair of spiracles positioned laterally on the body
- Endelus nepalensis, a jewel beetle
- Epicauta nepalensis, a blister beetle
- Episcardia nepalensis, a fungus moth
- Eria nepalensis, a flowering plant
- Erigone nepalensis, a carnivorous spider
- Erioptera nepalensis, a crane fly
