= Sphaerolaelaps holothyroides =

Scientific classification
- Domain: Eukaryota
- Kingdom: Animalia
- Phylum: Arthropoda
- Subphylum: Chelicerata
- Class: Arachnida
- Order: Mesostigmata
- Family: Pachylaelapidae
- Genus: Sphaerolaelaps
- Species: S. holothyroides

Binomial name
- Sphaerolaelaps holothyroides (Leonardi, 1896)

Species of mite

Sphaerolaelaps holothyroides is a species of mite in the family Pachylaelapidae.
