= Mirabulbus qinbaensis =

Scientific classification
- Kingdom: Animalia
- Phylum: Arthropoda
- Subphylum: Chelicerata
- Class: Arachnida
- Order: Mesostigmata
- Family: Bulbogamasidae
- Genus: Mirabulbus
- Species: M. qinbaensis

Binomial name
- Mirabulbus qinbaensis Liu & Ma, 2001

Species of mite

Mirabulbus qinbaensis is a species of mite in the family Pachylaelapidae.
