= Pachylaelaps siculus =

Scientific classification
- Domain: Eukaryota
- Kingdom: Animalia
- Phylum: Arthropoda
- Subphylum: Chelicerata
- Class: Arachnida
- Order: Mesostigmata
- Family: Pachylaelapidae
- Genus: Pachylaelaps
- Species: P. siculus

Binomial name
- Pachylaelaps siculus Berlese, 1921

Species of mite

Pachylaelaps siculus is a species of mite in the family Pachylaelapidae.
