= Mirabulbus yadongensis =

Scientific classification
- Kingdom: Animalia
- Phylum: Arthropoda
- Subphylum: Chelicerata
- Class: Arachnida
- Order: Mesostigmata
- Family: Bulbogamasidae
- Genus: Mirabulbus
- Species: M. yadongensis

Binomial name
- Mirabulbus yadongensis (Ma & Wang, 1997)

Species of mite

Mirabulbus yadongensis is a species of mite in the family Pachylaelapidae.
