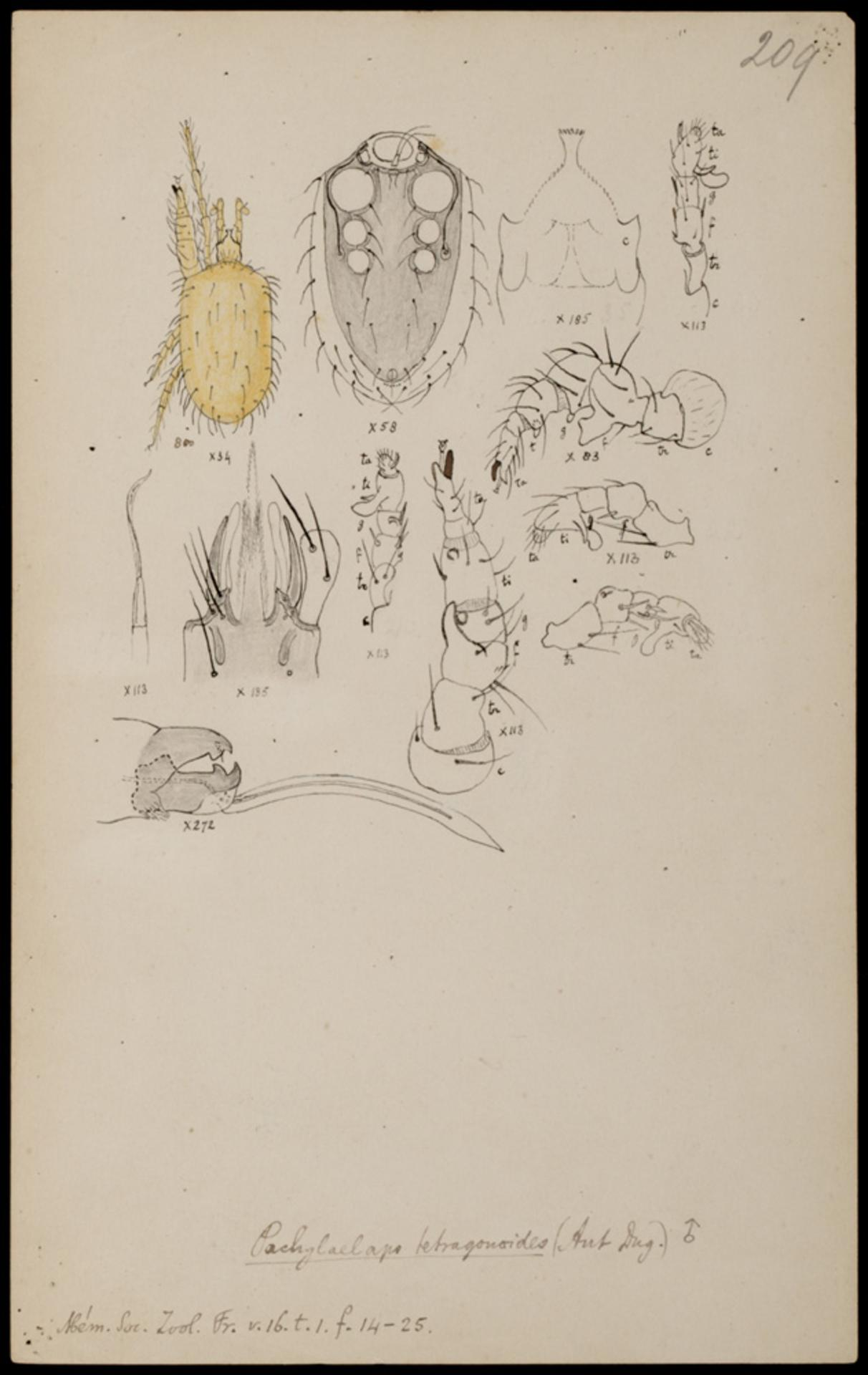
- Description of Pachylaelaps tetragonoides

Scientific classification
- Domain: Eukaryota
- Kingdom: Animalia
- Phylum: Arthropoda
- Subphylum: Chelicerata
- Class: Arachnida
- Order: Mesostigmata
- Family: Pachylaelapidae
- Genus: Pachylaelaps
- Species: P. tetragonoides

Binomial name
- Pachylaelaps tetragonoides (Duges, 1834)

= Pachylaelaps tetragonoides =

Species of mite

Pachylaelaps tetragonoides is a species of mite in the family Pachylaelapidae.
