= Pachylaelaps similis =

Scientific classification
- Kingdom: Animalia
- Phylum: Arthropoda
- Subphylum: Chelicerata
- Class: Arachnida
- Order: Mesostigmata
- Family: Pachylaelapidae
- Genus: Pachylaelaps
- Species: P. similis

Binomial name
- Pachylaelaps similis Mašán & Halliday, 2013

Synonyms
- Pachylaelaps reticulata Hafez & Nasr, 1982; Pachylaelaps reticulatus Berlese, 1904

Species of mite

Pachylaelaps similis is a species of mite in the family Pachylaelapidae.
