= Pachylaelaps australicus =

Scientific classification
- Kingdom: Animalia
- Phylum: Arthropoda
- Subphylum: Chelicerata
- Class: Arachnida
- Order: Mesostigmata
- Infraorder: Gamasina
- Superfamily: Eviphidoidea
- Family: Pachylaelapidae
- Genus: Pachylaelaps
- Species: P. australicus

Binomial name
- Pachylaelaps australicus Womersley, 1942

Species of mite

Pachylaelaps australicus is a species of mite in the family Pachylaelapidae.
