= Brachylaelaps =

Scientific classification
- Domain: Eukaryota
- Kingdom: Animalia
- Phylum: Arthropoda
- Subphylum: Chelicerata
- Class: Arachnida
- Order: Mesostigmata
- Family: Neoparasitidae
- Genus: Brachylaelaps; Berlese, 1910

Genus of mites

Brachylaelaps is a genus of mites in the family Neoparasitidae.

This genus was formerly in the family Pachylaelapidae.
