= Platylaelaps =

Scientific classification
- Kingdom: Animalia
- Phylum: Arthropoda
- Subphylum: Chelicerata
- Class: Arachnida
- Order: Mesostigmata
- Family: Neoparasitidae
- Genus: Platylaelaps; Berlese, 1905

Genus of mites

Platylaelaps is a genus of mites in the family Neoparasitidae.

This genus was formerly in the family Pachylaelapidae.
