= Zygoseius ovatus =

Scientific classification
- Domain: Eukaryota
- Kingdom: Animalia
- Phylum: Arthropoda
- Subphylum: Chelicerata
- Class: Arachnida
- Order: Mesostigmata
- Genus: Zygoseius
- Species: Z. ovatus

Binomial name
- Zygoseius ovatus Karg, 1998

Species of mite

Zygoseius ovatus is a species of mite in the family Pachylaelapidae.
