= Pachyseius humeralis =

Scientific classification
- Domain: Eukaryota
- Kingdom: Animalia
- Phylum: Arthropoda
- Subphylum: Chelicerata
- Class: Arachnida
- Order: Mesostigmata
- Family: Pachylaelapidae
- Genus: Pachyseius
- Species: P. humeralis

Binomial name
- Pachyseius humeralis Berlese, 1910

Species of mite

Pachyseius humeralis is a species of mite in the family Pachylaelapidae. It is found in Europe.
