= Pachylaelaps pectinifer =

Scientific classification
- Domain: Eukaryota
- Kingdom: Animalia
- Phylum: Arthropoda
- Subphylum: Chelicerata
- Class: Arachnida
- Order: Mesostigmata
- Family: Pachylaelapidae
- Genus: Pachylaelaps
- Species: P. pectinifer

Binomial name
- Pachylaelaps pectinifer (G. & R.Canestrini, 1881)

Species of mite

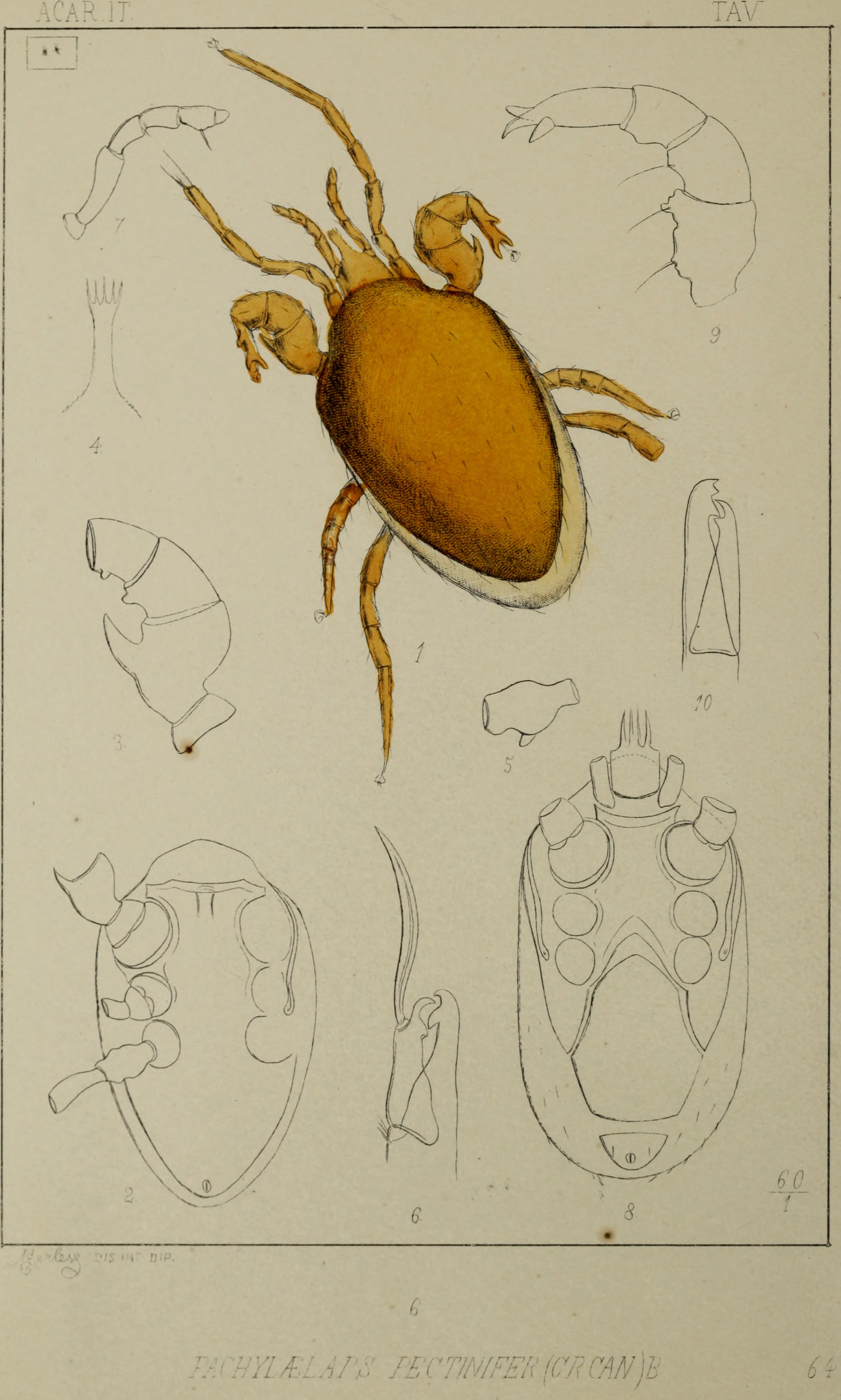
An illustration depicting Pachylaelaps pectinifer from 1892

Pachylaelaps pectinifer is a species of mite in the family Pachylaelapidae. It is found in Europe.
