= Pachylaelaps ensifer =

Scientific classification
- Kingdom: Animalia
- Phylum: Arthropoda
- Subphylum: Chelicerata
- Class: Arachnida
- Order: Mesostigmata
- Family: Pachylaelapidae
- Genus: Pachylaelaps
- Species: P. ensifer

Binomial name
- Pachylaelaps ensifer Oudemans, 1904

Species of mite

Pachylaelaps ensifer is a species of mite in the family Pachylaelapidae.
