= Onchodellus regularis =

Scientific classification
- Domain: Eukaryota
- Kingdom: Animalia
- Phylum: Arthropoda
- Subphylum: Chelicerata
- Class: Arachnida
- Order: Mesostigmata
- Family: Pachylaelapidae
- Genus: Onchodellus
- Species: O. regularis

Binomial name
- Onchodellus regularis (Berlese, 1920)

Species of mite

Onchodellus regularis is a species of mite in the family Pachylaelapidae.
