= Zygoseius alveolaris =

Scientific classification
- Domain: Eukaryota
- Kingdom: Animalia
- Phylum: Arthropoda
- Subphylum: Chelicerata
- Class: Arachnida
- Order: Mesostigmata
- Genus: Zygoseius
- Species: Z. alveolaris

Binomial name
- Zygoseius alveolaris Karg, 1998

Species of mite

Zygoseius alveolaris is a species of mite in the family Pachylaelapidae.
