= Zygoseius =

Scientific classification
- Kingdom: Animalia
- Phylum: Arthropoda
- Subphylum: Chelicerata
- Class: Arachnida
- Order: Mesostigmata
- Superfamily: Eviphidoidea
- Genus: Zygoseius; Berlese, 1917

Genus of mites

Zygoseius is a genus of mites in the superfamily Eviphidoidea. There are about nine described species in Zygoseius.

This genus is currently unplaced within the superfamily, but was formerly in the family Pachylaelapidae.

== Species ==
These nine species belong to the genus Zygoseius:

- Zygoseius alveolaris Karg, 1998
- Zygoseius incisus Karg, 1998
- Zygoseius lindquisti Berlese, 1917
- Zygoseius macroporus Karg & Schorlemmer, 2009
- Zygoseius margaritatus Karg & Schorlemmer, 2009
- Zygoseius ovatus Karg, 1998
- Zygoseius papaver Berlese, 1917
- Zygoseius setoporus Karg, 1998
- Zygoseius triramuli Karg & Schorlemmer, 2009
