= Paralaelaps kibonotensis =

Scientific classification
- Kingdom: Animalia
- Phylum: Arthropoda
- Subphylum: Chelicerata
- Class: Arachnida
- Order: Mesostigmata
- Family: Pachylaelapidae
- Subfamily: Pachylaelapinae
- Tribe: Paralaelapini
- Genus: Paralaelaps
- Species: P. kibonotensis

Binomial name
- Paralaelaps kibonotensis (Trägårdh, 1908)

Types of termite

Paralaelaps kibonotensis is a species of mite in the family Pachylaelapidae.
