= Pachylaelaps dubius =

Scientific classification
- Domain: Eukaryota
- Kingdom: Animalia
- Phylum: Arthropoda
- Subphylum: Chelicerata
- Class: Arachnida
- Order: Mesostigmata
- Family: Pachylaelapidae
- Genus: Pachylaelaps
- Species: P. dubius

Binomial name
- Pachylaelaps dubius Hirschmann & Krauss, 1965

Species of mite

Pachylaelaps dubius is a species of mite in the family Pachylaelapidae.
