= Pachydellus latior =

Scientific classification
- Domain: Eukaryota
- Kingdom: Animalia
- Phylum: Arthropoda
- Subphylum: Chelicerata
- Class: Arachnida
- Order: Mesostigmata
- Family: Pachylaelapidae
- Genus: Pachydellus
- Species: P. latior

Binomial name
- Pachydellus latior (Berlese, 1920)

Species of mite

Pachydellus latior is a species of mite in the family Pachylaelapidae.
