= Pachyseius wideventris =

Scientific classification
- Domain: Eukaryota
- Kingdom: Animalia
- Phylum: Arthropoda
- Subphylum: Chelicerata
- Class: Arachnida
- Order: Mesostigmata
- Family: Pachylaelapidae
- Genus: Pachyseius
- Species: P. wideventris

Binomial name
- Pachyseius wideventris Afifi & Nasr, 1986

Species of mite

Pachyseius wideventris is a species of mite in the family Pachylaelapidae. It is found in Europe.
