= Elaphrolaelaps sternalis =

Scientific classification
- Kingdom: Animalia
- Phylum: Arthropoda
- Subphylum: Chelicerata
- Class: Arachnida
- Order: Mesostigmata
- Infraorder: Gamasina
- Superfamily: Eviphidoidea
- Family: Pachylaelapidae
- Genus: Elaphrolaelaps
- Species: E. sternalis

Binomial name
- Elaphrolaelaps sternalis Ryke, 1959

Species of mite

Elaphrolaelaps sternalis is a species of mite in the family Pachylaelapidae.
