= Pachydellus sculptus =

Scientific classification
- Domain: Eukaryota
- Kingdom: Animalia
- Phylum: Arthropoda
- Subphylum: Chelicerata
- Class: Arachnida
- Order: Mesostigmata
- Family: Pachylaelapidae
- Genus: Pachydellus
- Species: P. sculptus

Binomial name
- Pachydellus sculptus (Berlese, 1920)

Species of mite

Pachydellus sculptus is a species of mite in the family Pachylaelapidae. It is found in Europe.
