= Pachyseius orientalis =

Scientific classification
- Kingdom: Animalia
- Phylum: Arthropoda
- Subphylum: Chelicerata
- Class: Arachnida
- Order: Mesostigmata
- Family: Pachylaelapidae
- Genus: Pachyseius
- Species: P. orientalis

Binomial name
- Pachyseius orientalis Nikolsky, 1982

Species of mite

Pachyseius orientalis is a species of mite in the family Pachylaelapidae.
