= Olopachys scutatus =

Scientific classification
- Domain: Eukaryota
- Kingdom: Animalia
- Phylum: Arthropoda
- Subphylum: Chelicerata
- Class: Arachnida
- Order: Mesostigmata
- Family: Pachylaelapidae
- Genus: Olopachys
- Species: O. scutatus

Binomial name
- Olopachys scutatus Berlese, 1910

Species of mite

Olopachys scutatus is a species of mite in the family Pachylaelapidae.
