= Onchodellus hispani =

Scientific classification
- Kingdom: Animalia
- Phylum: Arthropoda
- Subphylum: Chelicerata
- Class: Arachnida
- Order: Mesostigmata
- Family: Pachylaelapidae
- Genus: Onchodellus
- Species: O. hispani

Binomial name
- Onchodellus hispani (Berlese, 1908)

Species of mite

Onchodellus hispani is a species of mite in the family Pachylaelapidae.
