= Neoparasitus =

Scientific classification
- Kingdom: Animalia
- Phylum: Arthropoda
- Subphylum: Chelicerata
- Class: Arachnida
- Order: Mesostigmata
- Family: Neoparasitidae
- Genus: Neoparasitus; Oudemans, 1901

Genus of mites

Neoparasitus is a genus of mites in the family Pachylaelapidae. There are at least four described species in Neoparasitus.

== Species ==
These four species belong to the genus Neoparasitus:

- Neoparasitus jacobsonianus (Berlese, 1911)
- Neoparasitus molossus (Berlese, 1923)
- Neoparasitus orientalis (Berlese, 1910)
- Neoparasitus quartus (Vitzthum, 1926)
