= Pachylaelaps neoxenillitus =

Scientific classification
- Kingdom: Animalia
- Phylum: Arthropoda
- Subphylum: Chelicerata
- Class: Arachnida
- Order: Mesostigmata
- Infraorder: Gamasina
- Superfamily: Eviphidoidea
- Family: Pachylaelapidae
- Genus: Pachylaelaps
- Species: P. neoxenillitus

Binomial name
- Pachylaelaps neoxenillitus Ma, 1997

Species of mite

Pachylaelaps neoxenillitus is a species of mite in the family Pachylaelapidae.
