= Chaetodellus =

Scientific classification
- Kingdom: Animalia
- Phylum: Arthropoda
- Subphylum: Chelicerata
- Class: Arachnida
- Order: Mesostigmata
- Family: Pachylaelapidae
- Subfamily: Pachylaelapinae
- Tribe: Onchodellini
- Genus: Chaetodellus; Mašán & Halliday, 2013

Genus of mites

Chaetodellus is a genus of mites in the family Pachylaelapidae. There are at least two described species in Chaetodellus.

== Species ==
These two species belong to the genus Chaetodellus:

- Chaetodellus comatus Mašán & Halliday, 2013
- Chaetodellus meganalis (Halliday, 2005)
