= Pachylaelapsoides =

Scientific classification
- Kingdom: Animalia
- Phylum: Arthropoda
- Subphylum: Chelicerata
- Class: Arachnida
- Order: Mesostigmata
- Family: Pachylaelapidae
- Tribe: Onchodellini
- Genus: Pachylaelapsoides; Mašán, 2007
- Species: P. longipedis

Binomial name
- Pachylaelapsoides longipedis Mašán, 2007

Genus of mites

Pachylaelapsoides is a genus of mites in the family Pachylaelapidae. This genus has a single species, Pachylaelapsoides longipedis.
