= Pachysphaerolaelaps =

Scientific classification
- Kingdom: Animalia
- Phylum: Arthropoda
- Subphylum: Chelicerata
- Class: Arachnida
- Order: Mesostigmata
- Family: Pachylaelapidae
- Tribe: Onchodellini
- Genus: Pachysphaerolaelaps; Mašán, 2007
- Species: P. calcariger

Binomial name
- Pachysphaerolaelaps calcariger (Berlese, 1902)

Genus of mites

Pachysphaerolaelaps is a genus of mites in the family Pachylaelapidae. This genus has a single species, Pachysphaerolaelaps calcariger.
