= Olopachys =

Scientific classification
- Kingdom: Animalia
- Phylum: Arthropoda
- Subphylum: Chelicerata
- Class: Arachnida
- Order: Mesostigmata
- Superfamily: Eviphidoidea
- Family: Pachylaelapidae
- Genus: Olopachys; Berlese, 1910

Subgenera
- Olopachylaella Mašán, 2007; Olopachys Berlese, 1910

Genus of mites

Olopachys is a genus of mites in the family Pachylaelapidae. There are about 14 described species in Olopachys.

== Species ==
These 14 species belong to the genus Olopachys:

- Olopachys adsharicus Koroleva, 1976
- Olopachys annae Koroleva, 1976
- Olopachys caucasicus Koroleva, 1976
- Olopachys compositus Koroleva, 1976
- Olopachys crassipes Koroleva, 1976
- Olopachys golubevi Reitblat, 1958
- Olopachys gronychi Mašán, 2007
- Olopachys kacheticus Koroleva, 1976
- Olopachys latiscutus Koroleva, 1976
- Olopachys scutatus (Berlese, 1910)
- Olopachys sklari Koroleva, 1976
- Olopachys suecicus Sellnick, 1950
- Olopachys vlastae Mašán, 2007
- Olopachys vysotskajae Koroleva, 1976
