= Onchodellus =

Scientific classification
- Kingdom: Animalia
- Phylum: Arthropoda
- Subphylum: Chelicerata
- Class: Arachnida
- Order: Mesostigmata
- Family: Pachylaelapidae
- Subfamily: Pachylaelapinae
- Tribe: Onchodellini
- Genus: Onchodellus; Berlese, 1904

Genus of mites

Onchodellus is a genus of mites in the family Pachylaelapidae. There are more than 70 described species in Onchodellus.

== Species ==
These 77 species belong to the genus Onchodellus:

- Onchodellus aegypticus (Hafez & Nasr, 1982)
- Onchodellus ambulacralis (Ryke & Meyer, 1958)
- Onchodellus anovillosus (Berlese, 1920)
- Onchodellus antillanus Turk, 1948
- Onchodellus armatus (André, 1945)
- Onchodellus auricularis (Moraza & Peña, 2005)
- Onchodellus australis (Berlese, 1910)
- Onchodellus bibulus Mašán, 2007
- Onchodellus brachiosus (Hirschmann & Krauss, 1965)
- Onchodellus bregetovae (Koroleva, 1977)
- Onchodellus brevicrinitus (Hirschmann & Krauss, 1965)
- Onchodellus brevis (Berlese, 1920)
- Onchodellus brevisetosus (Gu, Huang & Li, 1991)
- Onchodellus brevisternalis (Koroleva, 1977)
- Onchodellus calcaratus (Koroleva, 1977)
- Onchodellus canariensis (Moraza & Peña, 2005)
- Onchodellus concinnus (Hirschmann & Krauss, 1965)
- Onchodellus copris (Ishikawa, 1984)
- Onchodellus cordiformis (Berlese, 1910)
- Onchodellus ctenophorus (Oudemans, 1901)
- Onchodellus daruma (Ishikawa, 1977)
- Onchodellus davydovae (Alexandrova, 1980)
- Onchodellus dorsalis (Bhattacharyya, 1970)
- Onchodellus eurasius (Vitzthum, 1925)
- Onchodellus facetus (Hirschmann & Krauss, 1965)
- Onchodellus falcifer (Hirschmann & Krauss, 1965)
- Onchodellus falculiger (Berlese, 1910)
- Onchodellus flavus (Lombardini, 1941)
- Onchodellus friedrichi Mašán, 2007
- Onchodellus gansuensis (Ma, 1985)
- Onchodellus glandularis (Moraza & Peña, 2005)
- Onchodellus harukoae (Ishikawa, 1984)
- Onchodellus heliocopridis (Ryke & Meyer, 1958)
- Onchodellus helveticus Mašán, 2007
- Onchodellus hispani (Berlese, 1908)
- Onchodellus intermedius (Moraza & Peña, 2005)
- Onchodellus ishizuchiensis (Ishikawa, 1977)
- Onchodellus islandicus (Sellnick, 1969)
- Onchodellus jurassicus (Schweizer, 1961)
- Onchodellus karawaiewi (Berlese, 1920)
- Onchodellus kievati (Davydova, 1971)
- Onchodellus longus (Costa, 1971)
- Onchodellus michaelcostai Mašán & Halliday, 2014
- Onchodellus minutus (Oudemans, 1901)
- Onchodellus mixtus Mašán, 2007
- Onchodellus monticolus (Vitzthum, 1926)
- Onchodellus montivagus Mašán, 2007
- Onchodellus morazae Mašán & Halliday, 2014
- Onchodellus neglectus Mašán, 2007
- Onchodellus nidicolens (Koroleva, 1977)
- Onchodellus novus (Sellnick, 1943)
- Onchodellus onthophagi Mašán, 2007
- Onchodellus orientalis (Koroleva, 1977)
- Onchodellus parvulus (Koroleva, 1977)
- Onchodellus procerus Mašán, 2007
- Onchodellus quadritus (Gu, Huang & Li, 1991)
- Onchodellus regularis (Berlese, 1920)
- Onchodellus reticulatus (Berlese, 1904)
- Onchodellus roosevelti (Wharton, 1941)
- Onchodellus runculiger (Berlese, 1910)
- Onchodellus setosus (Bhattacharyya, 1970)
- Onchodellus siculus (Berlese, 1892)
- Onchodellus slovacus Mašán, 2014
- Onchodellus spectabilis (Berlese, 1910)
- Onchodellus squamosus (Koroleva, 1977)
- Onchodellus striatifer Mašán, 2007
- Onchodellus strigifer (Berlese, 1892)
- Onchodellus substrictus Mašán, 2007
- Onchodellus tegulifer Mašán, 2007
- Onchodellus tesselatus (Berlese, 1920)
- Onchodellus torocoxus (Gu, Huang & Li, 1991)
- Onchodellus trupchumi (Schweizer, 1961)
- Onchodellus tsengyihsiungi (Ma, Ho & Wang, 2008)
- Onchodellus volkovae (Goncharova & Koroleva, 1974)
- Onchodellus xinghaiensis (Ma, 1985)
- Onchodellus xizangensis (Ma & Wang, 1997)
- Onchodellus zoborensis Mašán, 2007
