= Pachydellus =

Scientific classification
- Kingdom: Animalia
- Phylum: Arthropoda
- Subphylum: Chelicerata
- Class: Arachnida
- Order: Mesostigmata
- Family: Pachylaelapidae
- Subfamily: Pachylaelapinae
- Tribe: Onchodellini
- Genus: Pachydellus; Mašán, 2007

Genus of mites

Pachydellus is a genus of mites in the family Pachylaelapidae. There are about 16 described species in Pachydellus.

== Species ==
These 16 species belong to the genus Pachydellus:

- Pachydellus alojzi Mašán, 2007
- Pachydellus angulatipes (Berlese, 1903)
- Pachydellus badongensis (Liu & Ma, 2003)
- Pachydellus decorus Mašán, 2007
- Pachydellus furcifer (Oudemans, 1902)
- Pachydellus hades (Halliday, 2001)
- Pachydellus ineptus (Hirschmann & Krauss, 1965)
- Pachydellus ivanovi (Koroleva, 1977)
- Pachydellus katarinae Mašán, 2007
- Pachydellus latior (Berlese, 1920)
- Pachydellus problematicus Mašán, 2007
- Pachydellus sculptus (Berlese, 1920)
- Pachydellus sinuatus (Willmann, 1939)
- Pachydellus tablasoti (Schweizer, 1961)
- Pachydellus tereziae Mašán, 2007
- Pachydellus vexillifer (Willmann, 1956)
