= Pseudopachys =

Scientific classification
- Kingdom: Animalia
- Phylum: Arthropoda
- Subphylum: Chelicerata
- Class: Arachnida
- Order: Mesostigmata
- Family: Pachylaelapidae
- Genus: Pseudopachys; Berlese, 1916
- Species: P. parasitizans

Binomial name
- Pseudopachys parasitizans (Berlese, 1916)

Synonyms
- Pseudopachyseiulus ignacii

Genus of mites

Pseudopachys is a genus of mites in the family Pachylaelapidae. This genus has a single species, Pseudopachys parasitizans, found in Europe.
