= Pachyglobolaelaps =

Scientific classification
- Kingdom: Animalia
- Phylum: Arthropoda
- Subphylum: Chelicerata
- Class: Arachnida
- Order: Mesostigmata
- Family: Pachylaelapidae
- Tribe: Onchodellini
- Genus: Pachyglobolaelaps; Mašán, 2014
- Species: P. hallidayi

Binomial name
- Pachyglobolaelaps hallidayi Mašán, 2014

Genus of mites

Pachyglobolaelaps is a genus of mites in the family Pachylaelapidae. This genus has a single species, Pachyglobolaelaps hallidayi.
