= Pachyseiulus =

Scientific classification
- Kingdom: Animalia
- Phylum: Arthropoda
- Subphylum: Chelicerata
- Class: Arachnida
- Order: Mesostigmata
- Family: Pachylaelapidae
- Genus: Pachyseiulus; Moraza & Johnston, 1990
- Species: P. singularis

Binomial name
- Pachyseiulus singularis (Schweizer, 1961)

Genus of mites

Pachyseiulus is a genus of mites in the family Pachylaelapidae. This genus has a single species, Pachyseiulus singularis.
