= Mirabulbus =

Scientific classification
- Kingdom: Animalia
- Phylum: Arthropoda
- Subphylum: Chelicerata
- Class: Arachnida
- Order: Mesostigmata
- Family: Bulbogamasidae
- Genus: Mirabulbus; Liu & Ma, 2001

Genus of mites

Mirabulbus is a genus of mites in the family Pachylaelapidae. There are about five described species in Mirabulbus.

== Species ==
These five species belong to the genus Mirabulbus:

- Mirabulbus lushanensis Ma, 2003
- Mirabulbus punctatus (Ishikawa, 1987)
- Mirabulbus qinbaensis Liu & Ma, 2001
- Mirabulbus scleoides (Ishikawa, 1969)
- Mirabulbus yadongensis (Ma & Wang, 1997)
