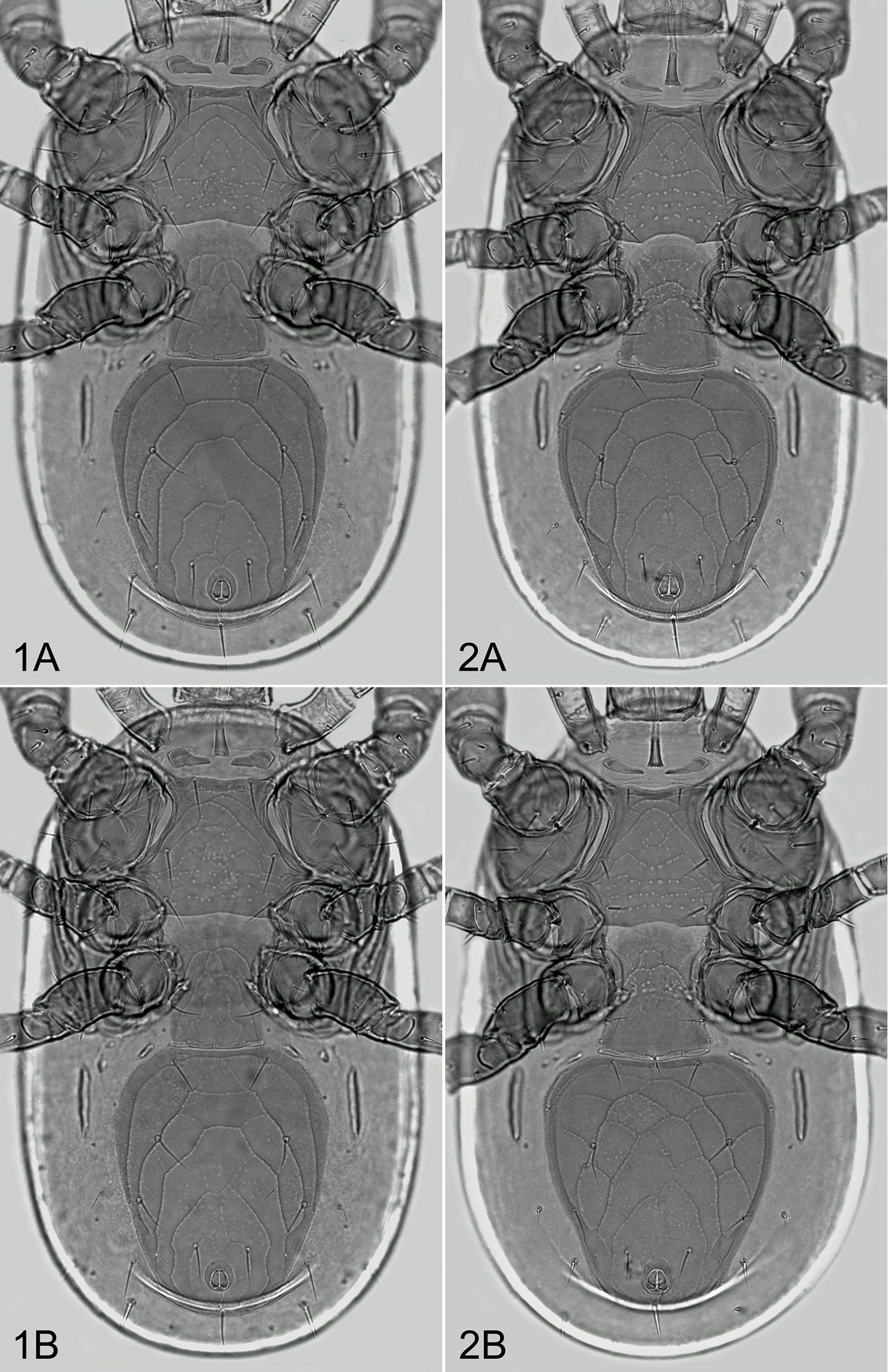
- Pachyseius humeralis and Pachyseius subhumeralis

Scientific classification
- Kingdom: Animalia
- Phylum: Arthropoda
- Subphylum: Chelicerata
- Class: Arachnida
- Order: Mesostigmata
- Family: Pachylaelapidae
- Genus: Pachyseius; Berlese, 1910

= Pachyseius =

Genus of mites

Pachyseius is a genus of mites in the family Pachylaelapidae. There are about 17 described species in Pachyseius.

== Species ==
These 17 species belong to the genus Pachyseius:

- Pachyseius angustiventris Willmann, 1935
- Pachyseius angustus Hyatt, 1956
- Pachyseius cavernicolus Ishikawa, 1989
- Pachyseius chenpengi Ma & Yin, 2000
- Pachyseius cicaki Mašán & Mihál, 2007
- Pachyseius friedrichi Mašán, 2008
- Pachyseius huanrenensis Chen, Bei & Gao, 2009
- Pachyseius humeralis Berlese, 1910
- Pachyseius iraola Moraza, 1993
- Pachyseius morazae Mašán & Mihál, 2007
- Pachyseius morenoi Moraza, 1993
- Pachyseius orientalis Nikolsky, 1982
- Pachyseius pachylaelapoides Mašán & Mihál, 2007
- Pachyseius sinicus Yin, Lu & Lan, 1986
- Pachyseius slavicus Mašán, 2007
- Pachyseius strandtmanni Solomon, 1982
- Pachyseius wideventris Afifi & Nasr, 1984
