= Neopachylaelaps =

Scientific classification
- Kingdom: Animalia
- Phylum: Arthropoda
- Subphylum: Chelicerata
- Class: Arachnida
- Order: Mesostigmata
- Family: Pachylaelapidae
- Tribe: Pachylaelapini
- Genus: Neopachylaelaps; Mašán, 2007
- Species: N. mancus

Binomial name
- Neopachylaelaps mancus Mašán, 2007

Genus of mites

Neopachylaelaps is a genus of mites in the family Pachylaelapidae. This genus has a single species, Neopachylaelaps mancus.
