= Paralaelaps =

Scientific classification
- Kingdom: Animalia
- Phylum: Arthropoda
- Subphylum: Chelicerata
- Class: Arachnida
- Order: Mesostigmata
- Family: Pachylaelapidae
- Subfamily: Pachylaelapinae
- Tribe: Paralaelapini
- Genus: Paralaelaps; Trägårdh, 1908

Genus of mites

Paralaelaps is a genus of mites in the family Pachylaelapidae. There are at least four described species in Paralaelaps.

== Species ==
These four species belong to the genus Paralaelaps:

- Paralaelaps gondarabae Lombardini, 1941
- Paralaelaps kibonotensis (Trägårdh, 1908)
- Paralaelaps major (Berlese, 1918)
- Paralaelaps pietersburgensis Spies & Ryke, 1965
