= Ebertius =

Ebertius nepalensis

Scientific classification
- Domain: Eukaryota
- Kingdom: Animalia
- Phylum: Arthropoda
- Class: Insecta
- Order: Coleoptera
- Suborder: Adephaga
- Family: Carabidae
- Genus: Ebertius; Jedlicka, 1965
- Species: E. nepalensis

Binomial name
- Ebertius nepalensis Jedlicka, 1965

Genus of beetles

Ebertius nepalensis is a species of beetle in the family Carabidae, the only species in the genus Ebertius.
