= Elaphrolaelaps =

Scientific classification
- Domain: Eukaryota
- Kingdom: Animalia
- Phylum: Arthropoda
- Subphylum: Chelicerata
- Class: Arachnida
- Order: Mesostigmata
- Superfamily: Eviphidoidea
- Family: Pachylaelapidae
- Genus: Elaphrolaelaps; Berlese, 1910

Subgenera
- Elaphrolaelaps Berlese, 1910; Incisosternum Elsen, 1974

Genus of mites

Elaphrolaelaps is a genus of mites in the family Pachylaelapidae. There are about eight described species in Elaphrolaelaps.

== Species ==
These eight species belong to the genus Elaphrolaelaps:

- Elaphrolaelaps castaneus (Trägårdh, 1908)
- Elaphrolaelaps fenestratus (Berlese, 1910)
- Elaphrolaelaps formidabilis (Berlese, 1918)
- Elaphrolaelaps integer (Berlese, 1918)
- Elaphrolaelaps rackae Costa, 1974
- Elaphrolaelaps sternalis Ryke, 1959
- Elaphrolaelaps terrificus (Berlese, 1920)
- Elaphrolaelaps tibialis Elsen, 1974
