= Sphaerolaelaps =

Scientific classification
- Kingdom: Animalia
- Phylum: Arthropoda
- Subphylum: Chelicerata
- Class: Arachnida
- Order: Mesostigmata
- Family: Pachylaelapidae
- Genus: Sphaerolaelaps; Berlese, 1903
- Species: S. holothyroides

Binomial name
- Sphaerolaelaps holothyroides (Leonardi, 1896)

Genus of mites

Sphaerolaelaps is a genus of mites in the family Pachylaelapidae. This genus has a single species, Sphaerolaelaps holothyroides.
