= Bulbogamasidae =

Scientific classification
- Kingdom: Animalia
- Phylum: Arthropoda
- Subphylum: Chelicerata
- Class: Arachnida
- Order: Mesostigmata
- Family: Bulbogamasidae

Family of mites

Bulbogamasidae is a family of mites belonging to the order Mesostigmata.

Genera:

- Bulbogamasus Gu, Wang & Duan, 1991
- Mirabulbus Liu & Ma, 2001
