= Pachylaelaps =

Scientific classification
- Kingdom: Animalia
- Phylum: Arthropoda
- Subphylum: Chelicerata
- Class: Arachnida
- Order: Mesostigmata
- Superfamily: Eviphidoidea
- Family: Pachylaelapidae
- Genus: Pachylaelaps; Berlese, 1888

Subgenera
- Longipachylaelaps Mašán, 2007; Pachylaelaps Berlese, 1888

Genus of mites

Pachylaelaps is a genus of mites in the family Pachylaelapidae. There are more than 50 described species in Pachylaelaps.

== Species ==
These 57 species belong to the genus Pachylaelaps:

- Pachylaelaps armimagnus Mašán, 2007
- Pachylaelaps atlanticus Mašán & Halliday, 2014
- Pachylaelaps australicus Womersley, 1942
- Pachylaelaps bellicosus Berlese, 1920
- Pachylaelaps bifurciger Berlese, 1920
- Pachylaelaps bocharovae Koroleva, 1978
- Pachylaelaps buyakovae Goncharova & Koroleva, 1974
- Pachylaelaps carpathicus Mašán, 2007
- Pachylaelaps carpathimagnus Mašán, 2007
- Pachylaelaps changbaiensis Chen, Bei & Gao, 2009
- Pachylaelaps citri Olivier & Loots, 1970
- Pachylaelaps conifer Hirschmann & Krauss, 1965
- Pachylaelaps decipiens Hirschmann & Krauss, 1965
- Pachylaelaps denticulatus Hirschmann & Krauss, 1965
- Pachylaelaps distinctus Mašán, 2007
- Pachylaelaps dubius Hirschmann & Krauss, 1965
- Pachylaelaps ensifer Oudemans, 1902
- Pachylaelaps evansi Costa, 1971
- Pachylaelaps femoralis Bhattacharyya, 1970
- Pachylaelaps fuscinuliger Berlese, 1921
- Pachylaelaps gallicus Berlese, 1920
- Pachylaelaps gibbosus Hirschmann & Krauss, 1965
- Pachylaelaps grandis Koroleva, 1977
- Pachylaelaps granulifer Hirschmann & Krauss, 1965
- Pachylaelaps hamifer Trägårdh, 1931
- Pachylaelaps hestulifer Hirschmann & Krauss, 1965
- Pachylaelaps imitans Berlese, 1920
- Pachylaelaps insularis Berlese, 1920
- Pachylaelaps kirghizorum Koroleva, 1977
- Pachylaelaps koroljevae Alexandrova, 1980
- Pachylaelaps littoralis Halbert, 1915
- Pachylaelaps longicrinitus Hirschmann & Krauss, 1965
- Pachylaelaps longisetis Halbert, 1915
- Pachylaelaps longulus Willmann, 1938
- Pachylaelaps multidentatus Evans & Hyatt, 1956
- Pachylaelaps neoxenillitus Ma, 1997
- Pachylaelaps nuditectus Ma & Yin, 2000
- Pachylaelaps obirensis Schmölzer, 1992
- Pachylaelaps pectinifer (G. Canestrini, 1881)
- Pachylaelaps perlucidus Mašán, 2007
- Pachylaelaps pulsator Hirschmann & Krauss, 1965
- Pachylaelaps quadricombinatus Gu, Huang & Li, 1991
- Pachylaelaps resinae Karg, 1971
- Pachylaelaps sacculimagnus Mašán, 2007
- Pachylaelaps similis Mašán & Halliday, 2013
- Pachylaelaps silviae Moraza & Peña, 2005
- Pachylaelaps squamifer Berlese, 1920
- Pachylaelaps sublongisetis Koroleva, 1977
- Pachylaelaps terreus Mašán, 2007
- Pachylaelaps tetragonoides (Dugès, 1834)
- Pachylaelaps tianschanicus Koroleva, 1977
- Pachylaelaps troglophilus Willmann, 1940
- Pachylaelaps turgidus Vitzthum, 1926
- Pachylaelaps undulatus Evans & Hyatt, 1956
- Pachylaelaps vicarius Mašán, 2007
- Pachylaelaps virago Berlese, 1920
- Pachylaelaps xenillitus Ma, 1985
