= Pachylaelapidae =

Scientific classification
- Kingdom: Animalia
- Phylum: Arthropoda
- Subphylum: Chelicerata
- Class: Arachnida
- Order: Mesostigmata
- Infraorder: Gamasina
- Superfamily: Eviphidoidea
- Family: Pachylaelapidae; Berlese, 1913

Subfamilies
- Pachylaelapinae Berlese, 1913; Pachyseiinae Karg, 1971; Pachyseiulinae Mašán, 2007

Family of mites

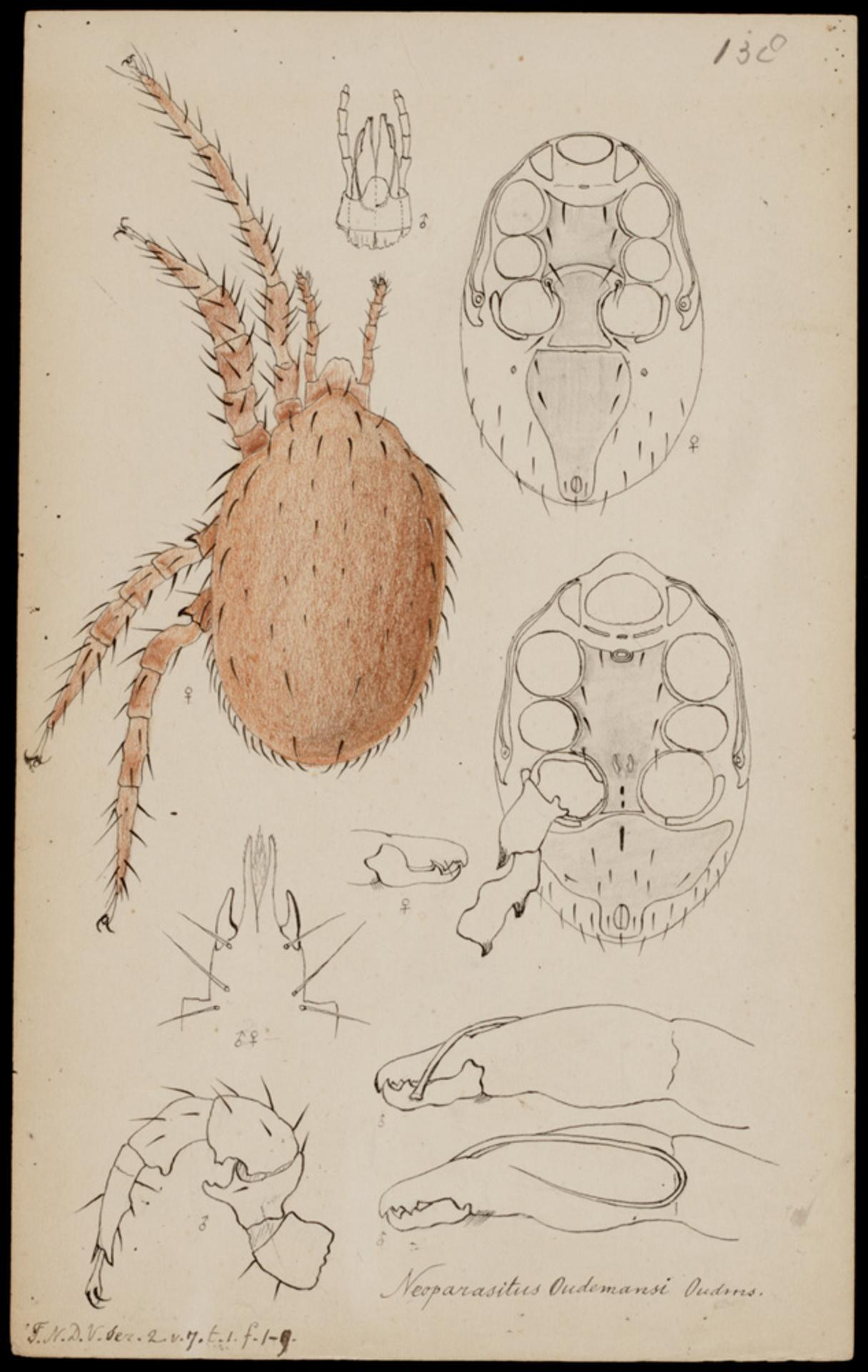
Neoparasitus oudemansi by A.C. Oudemans.

Pachylaelapidae is a family of mites in the order Mesostigmata. There are about 16 genera and more than 200 described species in Pachylaelapidae.

== Genera ==
These 16 genera belong to the family Pachylaelapidae:

- Chaetodellus Mašán & Halliday, 2013
- Elaphrolaelaps Berlese, 1910
- Mirabulbus Liu & Ma, 2001
- Neopachylaelaps Mašán, 2007
- Olopachys Berlese, 1910
- Onchodellus Berlese, 1904
- Pachydellus Mašán, 2007
- Pachyglobolaelaps Mašán, 2014
- Pachylaelaps Berlese, 1888
- Pachylaelapsoides Mašán, 2007
- Pachyseiulus Moraza & Johnston, 1990
- Pachyseius Berlese, 1910
- Pachysphaerolaelaps Mašán, 2007
- Paralaelaps Trägårdh, 1908
- Pseudopachys Berlese, 1916
- Sphaerolaelaps Berlese, 1903
