= C15H23NO2 =

The molecular formula C_{15}H_{23}NO_{2} (molar mass: 249.34 g/mol, exact mass: 249.1729 u) may refer to:

- Alprenolol
- Castoramine, an alkaloid found in castoreum
- Ciramadol
- 2C-CPE
- G-4 (drug)
- O-Desmethyltramadol
- Isobucaine
- Procinolol
