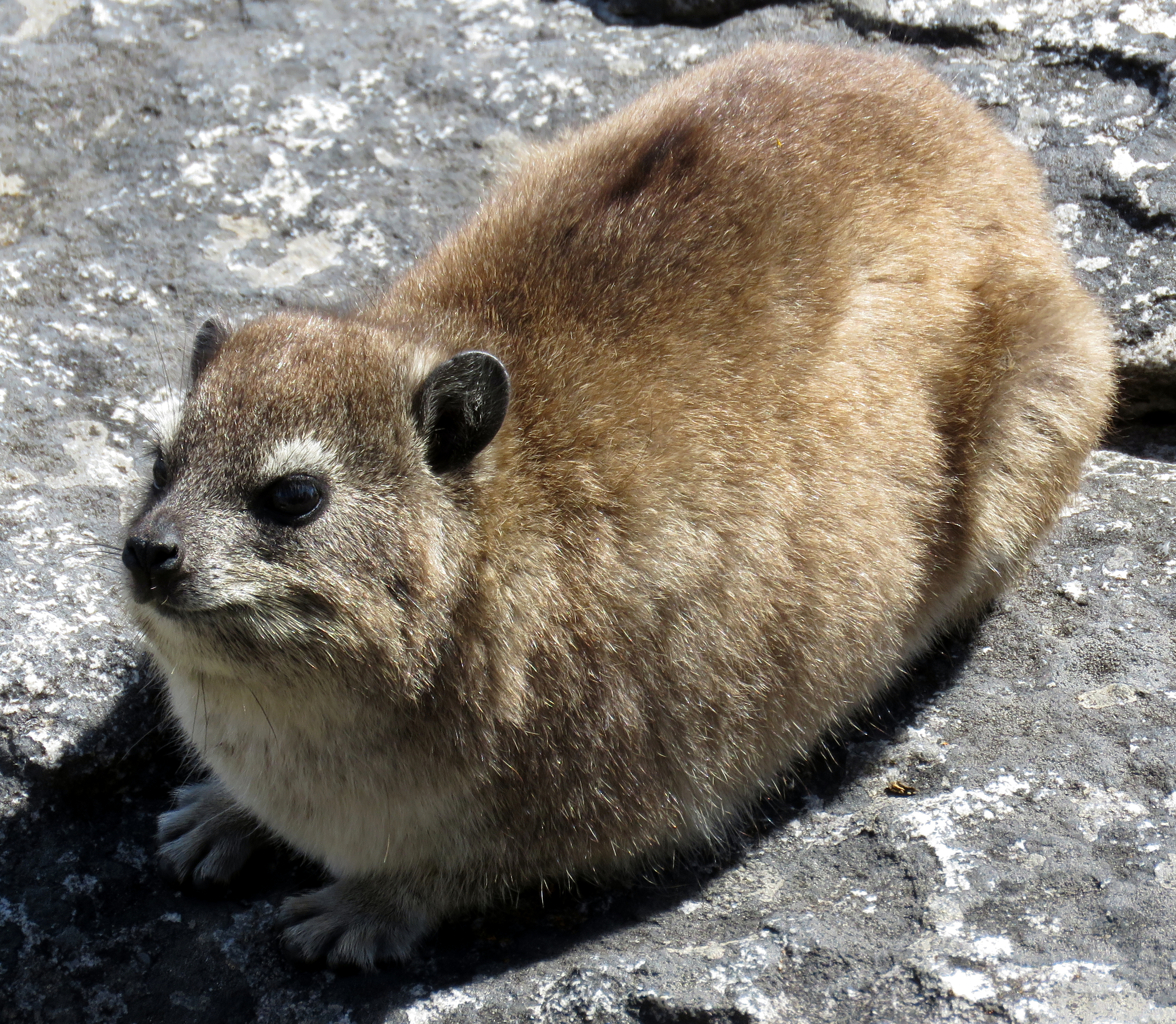
- Rock hyrax (Procavia capensis); Erongo, Namibia

Scientific classification
- Kingdom: Animalia
- Phylum: Chordata
- Class: Mammalia
- Order: Hyracoidea
- Family: Procaviidae; Thomas, 1892
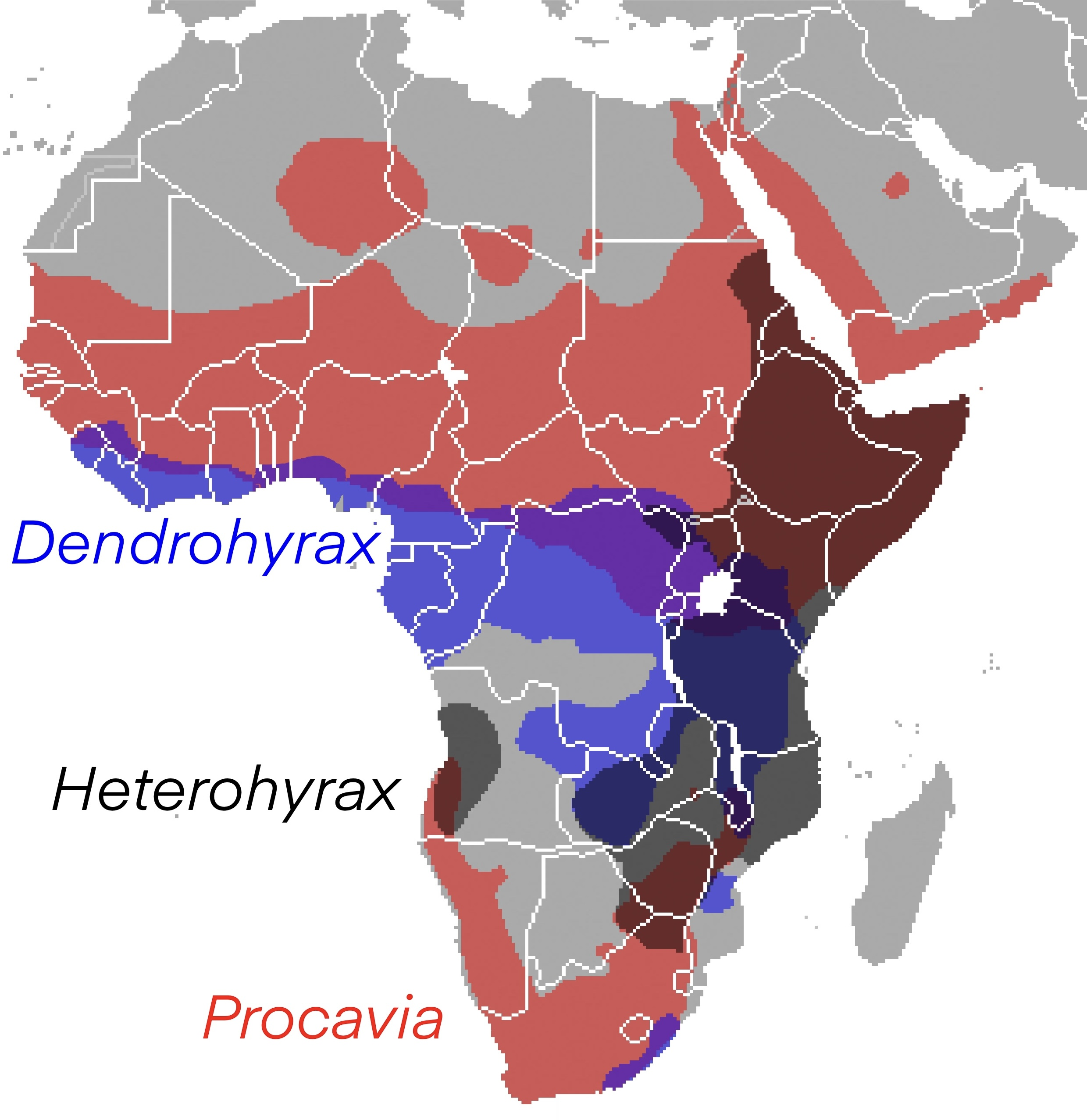
- Range map of Procaviidae

= Hyrax =

Hyraxes Temporal range: Eocene–recent 55.8–0 Ma

Order of small, herbivorous mammals

Hyraxes (from Ancient Greek ὕραξ hýrax 'shrew-mouse'), also called dassies, are small, stout, thickset, herbivorous mammals in the family Procaviidae within the order Hyracoidea. Hyraxes are well-furred, rotund animals with short tails. Modern hyraxes are typically between 30 and 70 cm (12 and 28 in) in length and weigh between 2 and 5 kg (4 and 11 lb). They are superficially similar to marmots or over-large pikas but are much more closely related to elephants and sirenians. Hyraxes have a life span of 9 to 14 years. Both types of "rock" hyrax (P. capensis and H. brucei) live on rock outcrops, including cliffs in Ethiopia and isolated granite outcrops called koppies in southern Africa.

Almost all hyraxes are limited to Africa; the exception is the rock hyrax (P. capensis) which is also found in adjacent parts of the Middle East.

Hyracoids were a much more diverse group in the past encompassing species considerably larger than modern hyraxes. The largest known extinct hyracoid, Titanohyrax ultimus, has been estimated to weigh 600–1,300 kilograms (1,300–2,900 lb), comparable to a water buffalo.

== Characteristics ==
Hyraxes retain or have redeveloped a number of primitive mammalian characteristics; in particular, they have poorly developed internal temperature regulation, for which they compensate by behavioural thermoregulation, such as huddling together and basking in the sun.

Unlike most other browsing and grazing animals, they do not use the incisors at the front of the jaw for slicing off leaves and grass; rather, they use the molar teeth at the side of the jaw. The two upper incisors are large and tusk-like, and grow continuously through life, similar to those of rodents. The four lower incisors are deeply grooved "comb teeth". A diastema occurs between the incisors and the cheek teeth. The permanent dental formula for hyraxes is 1.0.4.32.0.3-4.3 although sometimes stated as 1.1.4.32.1.4.3 because the deciduous canine teeth are occasionally retained into early adulthood.

A hyrax showing its characteristic chewing, grunting behavior, and incisor tusks

Although not ruminants, hyraxes have complex, multichambered stomachs that allow symbiotic bacteria to break down tough plant materials, but their overall ability to digest fibre is lower than that of the ungulates. Their mandibular motions are similar to chewing cud, (Note: All artiodactyl families and about 80% of the spp. were investigated. Chewing regurgitated fodder is an idle pastime, as well as an instinct associated with appetite. Characteristic movements were analyzed for undisturbed samples of animals maintained on preserves. Group-specific differences are reported in form, rhythm, frequency, and side of chewing motion. The ungulate type is characterized as a specialization. The operation is described for the first time for the order Hyracoidea. On the basis of 12 spp. of the marsupial subfamily Macropodinae rumination is inferred for the whole category. Advantages of the process are debated.) but the hyrax is physically incapable of regurgitation like several species. This chewing behaviour may be a form of agonistic behaviour when the animal feels threatened.

The hyrax does not construct dens, but rather seeks shelter in existing holes of varying size and configuration. Hyraxes urinate in a designated, communal area. The viscous urine quickly dries and, over generations, accretes to form massive middens. These structures can date back thousands of years. The petrified urine itself is known as hyraceum and serves as a record of the environment, as well as being used medicinally and in perfumes.

Hyraxes inhabit rocky terrain across sub-Saharan Africa and the Middle East. Their feet have rubbery pads with numerous sweat glands, which may help the animal maintain its grip when quickly moving up steep, rocky surfaces. Hyraxes have stumpy toes with hoof-like nails; four toes are on each front foot and three are on each back foot. They also have efficient kidneys, retaining water so that they can better survive in arid environments. They do not store body fat in the abdomen, but do store some fat around the kidneys and gonads.

Female hyraxes give birth to up to four young after a gestation period of seven to eight months, depending on the species. The young are weaned at 1–5 months of age, and reach sexual maturity at 16–17 months.

Hyraxes live in small family groups, with a single male that aggressively defends the territory from rivals. Where living space is abundant, the male may have sole access to multiple groups of females, each with its own range. The remaining males live solitary lives, often on the periphery of areas controlled by larger males, and mate only with younger females.

Hyraxes have highly charged myoglobin, which has been inferred to reflect an aquatic ancestry.

=== Similarities with Proboscidea and Sirenia ===
Hyraxes share several unusual characteristics with mammalian orders Proboscidea (elephants and their extinct relatives) and Sirenia (manatees and dugongs), which have resulted in their all being placed in the taxon Paenungulata. Male hyraxes lack a scrotum and their testicles remain tucked up in their abdominal cavity next to the kidneys, as do those of elephants, manatees, and dugongs. Female hyraxes have a pair of teats near their armpits (axilla), as well as four teats in their groin (inguinal area); elephants have a pair of teats near their axillae, and dugongs and manatees have a pair of teats, one located close to each of the front flippers. The tusks of hyraxes develop from the incisor teeth as do the tusks of elephants; most mammalian tusks develop from the canines. Hyraxes, like elephants, have flattened nails on the tips of their digits, rather than the curved, elongated claws usually seen on mammals.

== Evolution ==
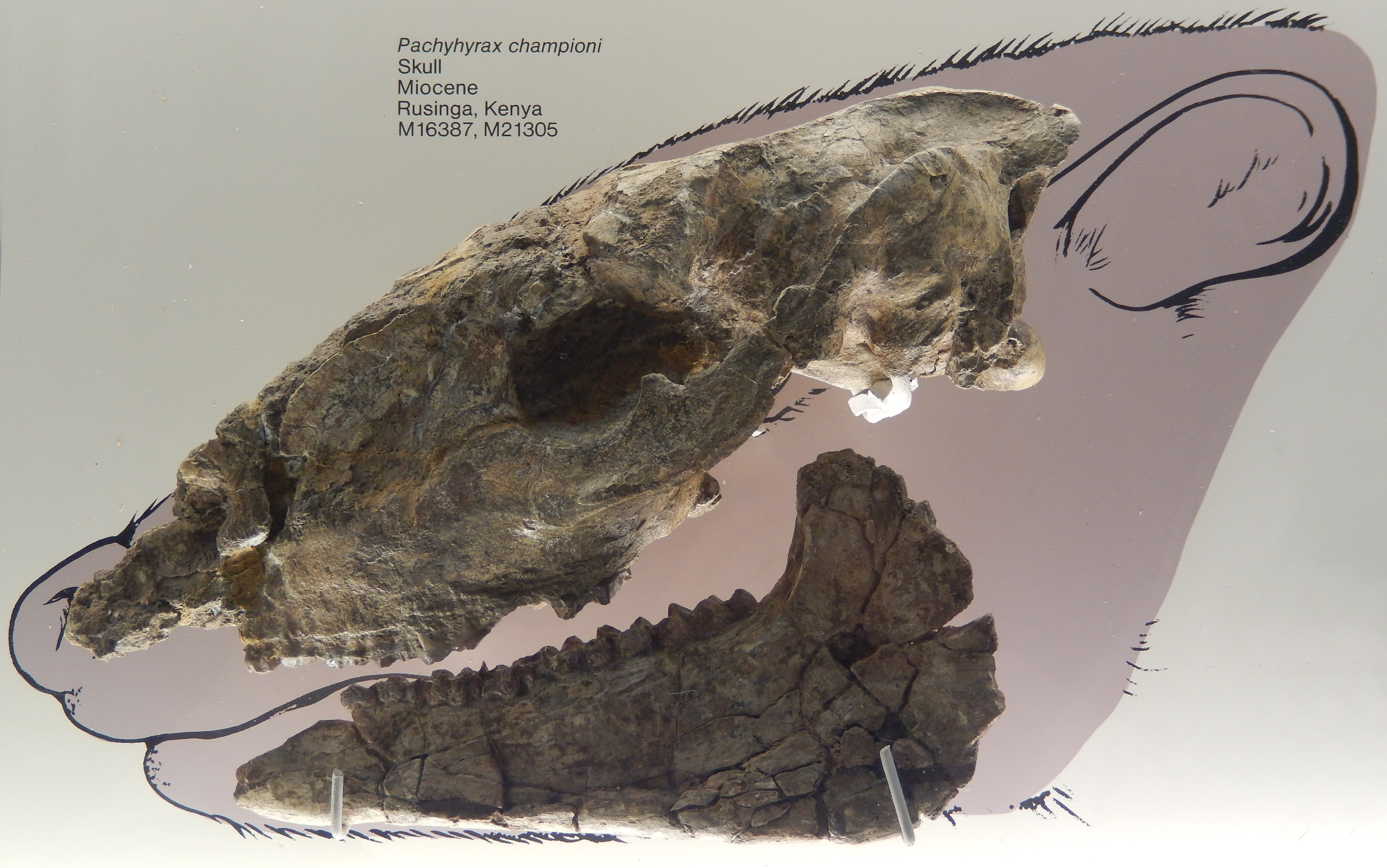
Pachyhyrax championi, a large fossil hyrax from the Miocene of Rusinga, Kenya (Natural History Museum collection)

All modern hyraxes are members of the family Procaviidae (the only living family within Hyracoidea) and are found only in Africa and the Middle East. In the past, however, hyraxes were more diverse and widespread. At one site in Egypt, the order first appears in the fossil record in the form of Dimaitherium, 37 million years ago, but much older fossils exist elsewhere. For many millions of years, hyraxes, proboscideans, and other afrotherian mammals were the primary terrestrial herbivores in Africa, just as odd-toed ungulates were in North America.

Through the middle to late Eocene, many different species existed. The smallest of these were the size of a mouse but others were much larger than any extant relatives. Titanohyrax could reach 600 kg (1,300 lb) or even as much as over 1,300 kg (2,900 lb). Megalohyrax from the upper Eocene-lower Oligocene was as huge as a tapir. During the Miocene, however, competition from the newly developed bovids, which were very efficient grazers and browsers, displaced the hyraxes into marginal niches. Nevertheless, the order remained widespread and diverse as late as the end of the Pliocene (about two million years ago) with representatives throughout most of Africa, Europe, and Asia.

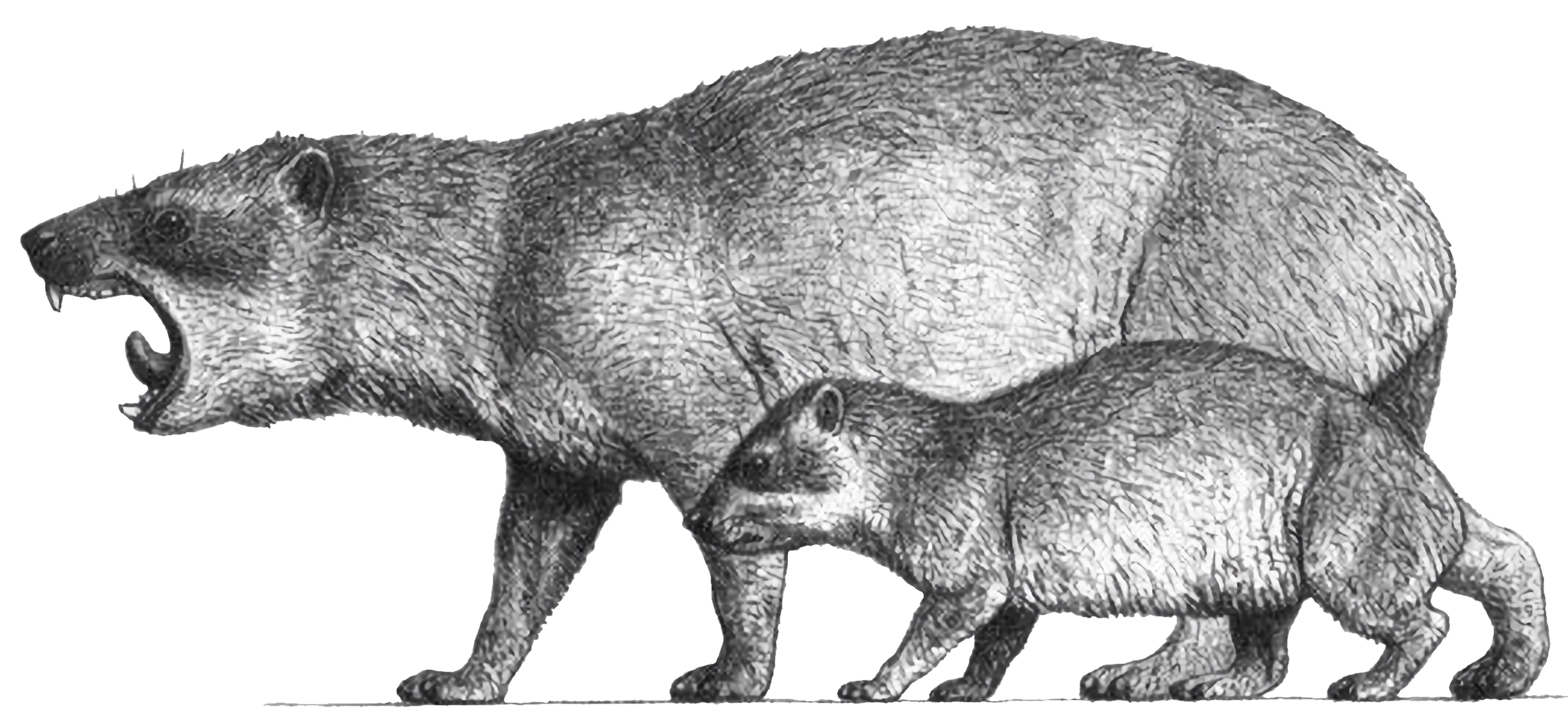
Restoration of the large, prehistoric Prohyrax next to a modern hyrax

The descendants of the giant "hyracoids" (common ancestors to the hyraxes, elephants, and sirenians) evolved in different ways. Some became smaller, and evolved to become the modern hyrax family. Others appear to have taken to the water (perhaps like the modern capybara), ultimately giving rise to the elephant family and perhaps also the sirenians. DNA evidence supports this hypothesis, and the small modern hyraxes share numerous features with elephants, such as toenails, excellent hearing, sensitive pads on their feet, small tusks, good memory, higher brain functions compared with other similar mammals, and the shape of some of their bones.

Hyraxes are sometimes described as being the closest living relative of the elephant, although this is disputed. Recent morphological- and molecular-based classifications reveal the sirenians to be the closest living relatives of elephants. While hyraxes are closely related, they form a taxonomic outgroup to the assemblage of elephants, sirenians, and the extinct orders Embrithopoda and Desmostylia.

The extinct meridiungulate family Archaeohyracidae, consisting of seven genera of notoungulate mammals known from the Paleocene through the Oligocene of South America, is a group not closely related to the true hyraxes.

Phylogeny of early hyracoids

- Eutheria
  - - - Perissodactyla (Note: The relationship of hyracoids and perissodactyls is controversial, and not supported by molecular data.)
        (horses, asses, and zebras; rhinos; and tapirs)
    - - †Phenacodontidae (Note: The position of the phenacodontids has been long unresolved; some authorities suspect that they are basal members of the perissodactyls, but that placement is contested.)
  - Afrotheria
    - Proboscidea
      (elephants, mammoths, and mastodons)
    - Hyracoidea
      - †Seggeurius
      - - †Microhyrax
        - - Geniohyiinae
            †Geniohyus
          - †Saghatheriinae (Note: Modern-day hyrax species (Procaviidae) may have evolved from smaller members of one of the Saghatheriinae.)
            - †Bunohyrax
            - - †Pachyhyrax
              - - †Thyrohyrax
                - - †Megalohyrax
                  - - - †Antilohyrax
                      - †Titanohyrax
                    - - †Saghatherium
                      - †Selenohyrax

A phylogeny of hyracoids known from the early Eocene through the middle Oligocene epoch.

== Extant species ==
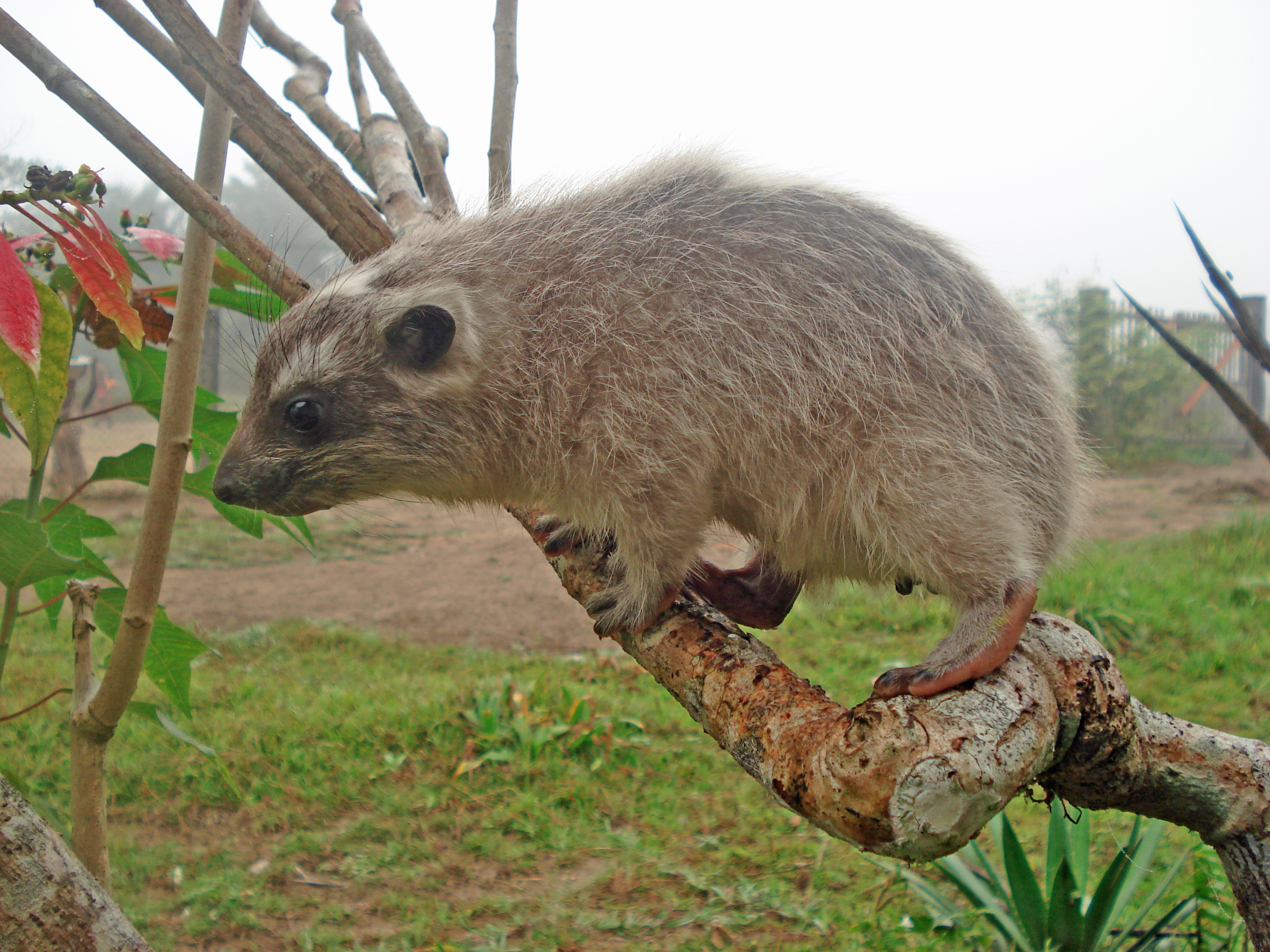
Western tree hyrax in the Democratic Republic of the Congo

In the 2000s, taxonomists reduced the number of recognized species of hyraxes. In 1995, they recognized 11 species or more. However, as of 2013, only four were recognized, with the others all considered as subspecies of one of the recognized four. Over 50 subspecies and species are described, many of which are considered highly endangered. The most recently identified species is Dendrohyrax interfluvialis, which is a tree hyrax living between the Volta and Niger rivers in West Africa, but makes a unique barking call that is distinct from the shrieking vocalizations of hyraxes inhabiting other regions of the African forest zone.

The following cladogram shows the relationship between the extant genera:

- Hyracoidea (order)
  - †Pliohyracidae (family)
    (extinct hyrax genera; uncertain position)
  - Procaviidae (family)
    - - Heterohyrax (genus)
        Yellow-spotted rock hyrax, H. brucei
      - Procavia (genus)
        Rock hyrax, P. capensis
    - - Dendrohyrax (genus)
        - Western tree hyrax, D. dorsalis
        - Benin tree hyrax, D. interfluvialis
        - - Southern tree hyrax, D. arboreus arboreus
          - Eastern tree hyrax, D. arboreus validus

== Name ==
=== Biblical references ===
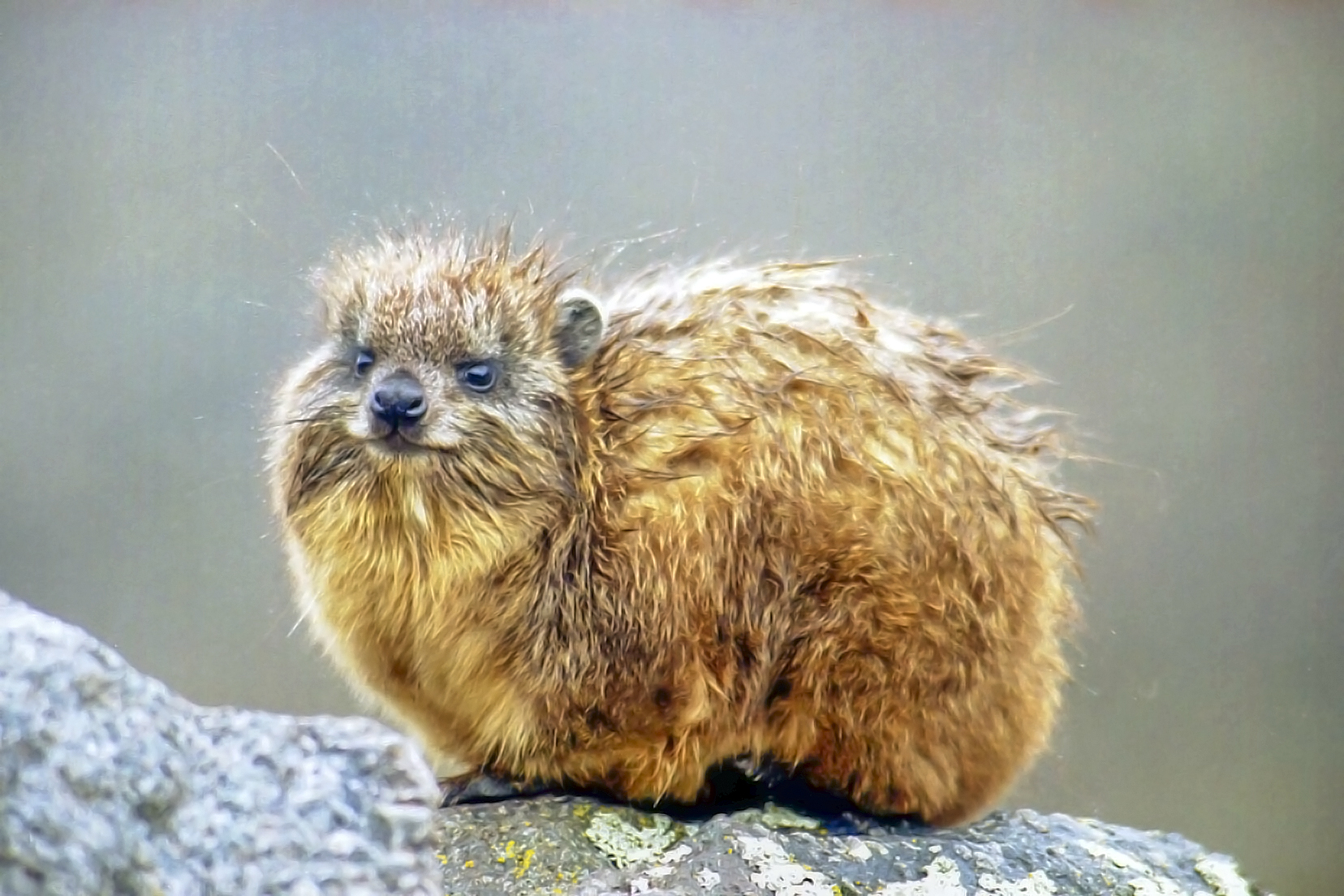
Young hyrax on Mount Kenya

References are made to hyraxes in the Hebrew Bible. In Leviticus they are described as lacking a split hoof and therefore not being kosher. Some of the modern translations refer to them as rock hyraxes. The words "rabbit", "hare", "coney", and "daman" appear as terms for the hyrax in some English translations of the Bible. Early English translators had no knowledge of the hyrax, so they did not give a name for them, though "badger" or "rock-badger" has also been used more recently in new translations, especially in "common language" translations such as the Common English Bible (2011).

=== "Spain" ===
One of the proposed etymologies for "Spain" is that it may be a derivation of the Phoenician I-Shpania, meaning "island of hyraxes", "land of hyraxes", but the Phoenician-speaking Carthaginians are believed to have used this name to refer to rabbits. Roman coins struck in the region from the reign of Hadrian show a female figure with a rabbit at her feet, and Strabo called it the "land of the 'rabbits'".

== See also ==
- Altungulata
