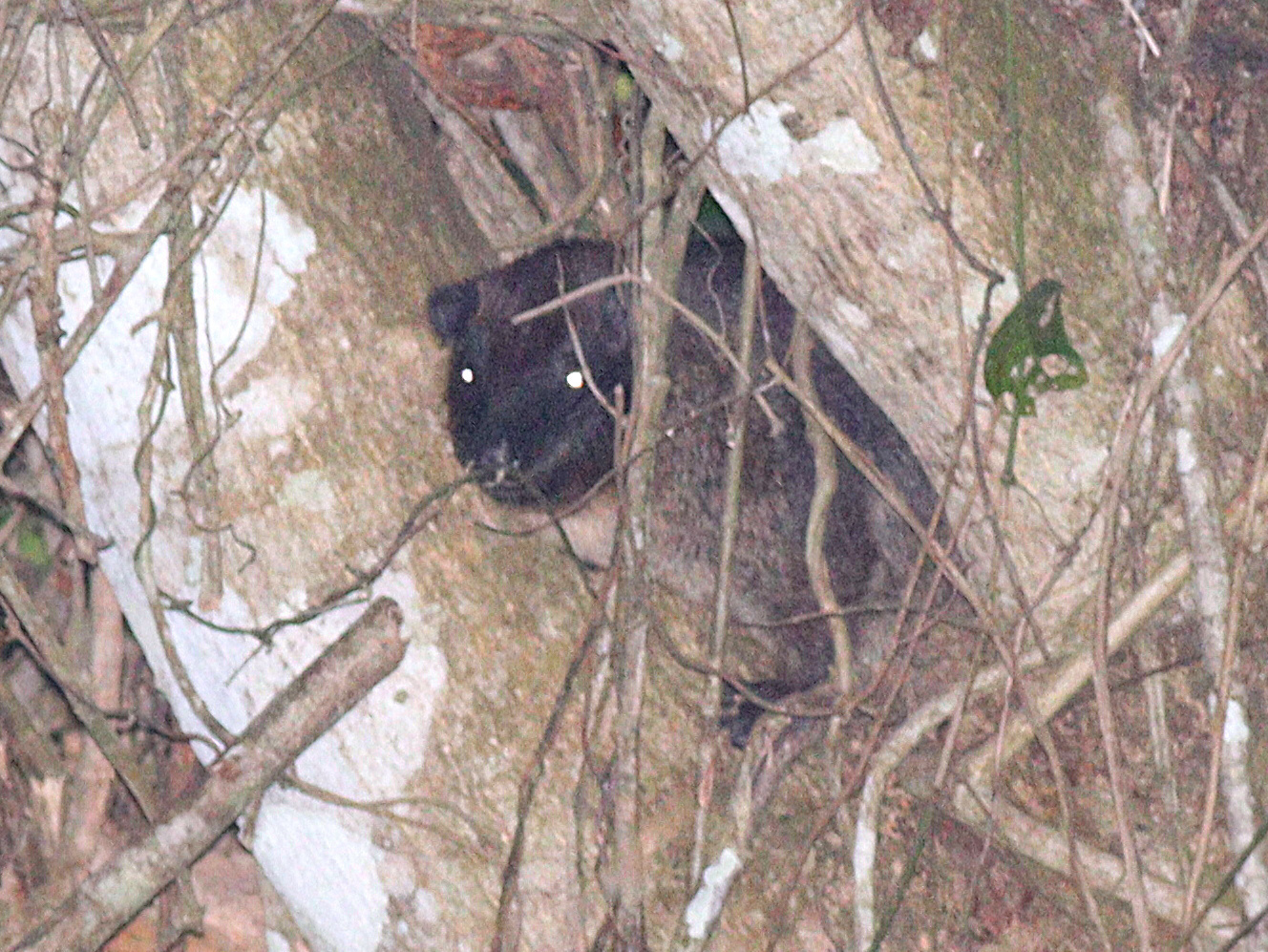

Scientific classification
- Kingdom: Animalia
- Phylum: Chordata
- Class: Mammalia
- Infraclass: Placentalia
- Order: Hyracoidea
- Family: Procaviidae
- Genus: Dendrohyrax
- Species: D. interfluvialis

Binomial name
- Dendrohyrax interfluvialis Oates, et al. (2022)

= Benin tree hyrax =

Species of mammal

The Benin tree hyrax (Dendrohyrax interfluvialis) is a species of tree hyrax within the family Procaviidae. It can be distinguished from neighboring Dendrohyrax dorsalis by its nighttime barking vocalizations, its shorter and broader skull, and its lighter pelage. Its range is the region between the Niger and Volta Rivers in West Africa, hence the specific epithet.

== See also ==
- List of living mammal species described in the 2020s
