= 5-Methoxysalicylic acid =

Names
- Preferred IUPAC name 2-Hydroxy-5-methoxybenzoic acid
- Other names 5-Methoxysalicylic acid 6-Hydroxy-m-anisic acid 5-Methoxy-2-hydroxybenzoic acid m-Anisic acid MSA

Identifiers
CAS Number	2612-02-4
3D model (JSmol)	Interactive image
ChEBI	CHEBI:89830
ChEMBL	ChEMBL452949
ChemSpider	68296
ECHA InfoCard	100.018.217
EC Number	220-037-8
PubChem CID	75787
UNII	6GAI2MTV5V
CompTox Dashboard (EPA)	DTXSID0062551
- InChI: InChI=1S/C8H8O4/c1-12-5-2-3-7(9)6(4-5)8(10)11/h2-4,9H,1H3,(H,10,11) Key: IZZIWIAOVZOBLF-UHFFFAOYSA-N
- SMILES: COC1=CC(=C(C=C1)O)C(=O)O

Properties
Chemical formula	C_{8}H_{8}O_{4}
Molar mass	168.148 g·mol^{−1}

Hazards
- GHS labelling
Pictograms	(GHS07: Exclamation mark)
Signal word	Warning
Hazard statements	H315, H319, H335
Precautionary statements	P261, P264, P264+P265, P271, P280, P302+P352, P304+P340, P305+P351+P338, P319, P321, P332+P317, P337+P317, P362+P364, P403+P233, P405, P501
- Except where otherwise noted, data are given for materials in their standard state (at 25 °C [77 °F], 100 kPa). Infobox references

5-Methoxysalicylic acid is a chemical compound. It is a component of castoreum, the exudate from the castor sacs of the mature beaver.

A mixture of 5-methoxysalicylic acid and spermine can be used as a matrix for oligonucleotides analysis in MALDI mass spectrometry.

It is an isomer of vanillic acid.
