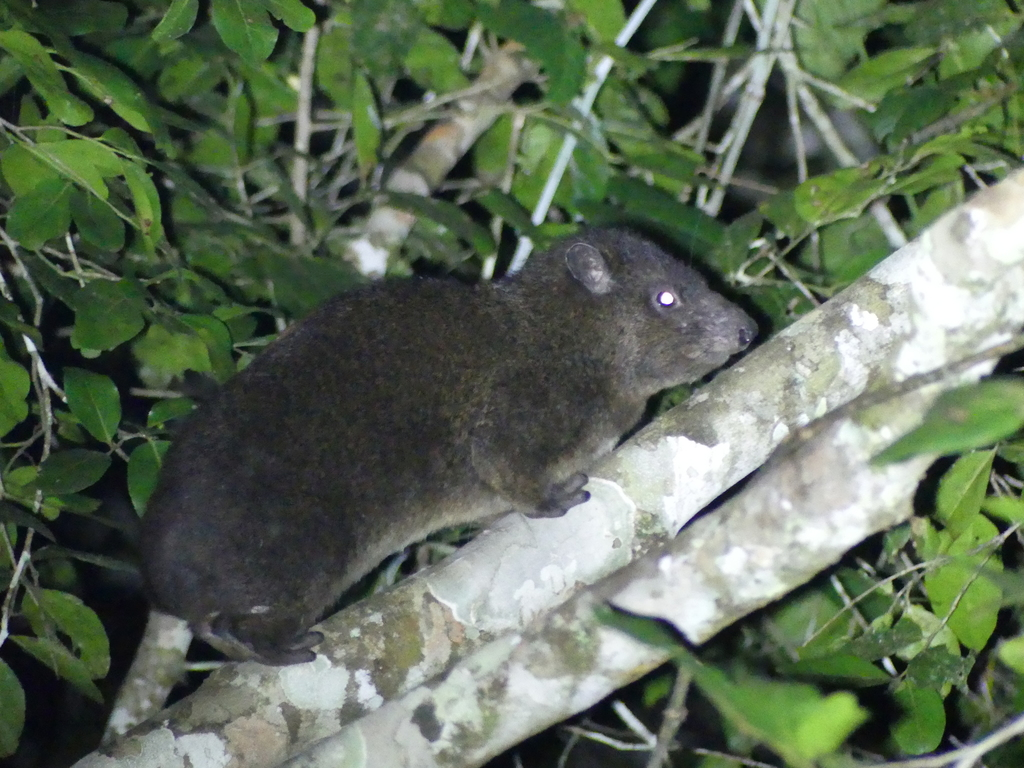

Conservation status
- Near Threatened (IUCN 3.1)

Scientific classification
- Kingdom: Animalia
- Phylum: Chordata
- Class: Mammalia
- Order: Hyracoidea
- Family: Procaviidae
- Genus: Dendrohyrax
- Species: D. validus

Binomial name
- Dendrohyrax validus (F. W. True, 1890)
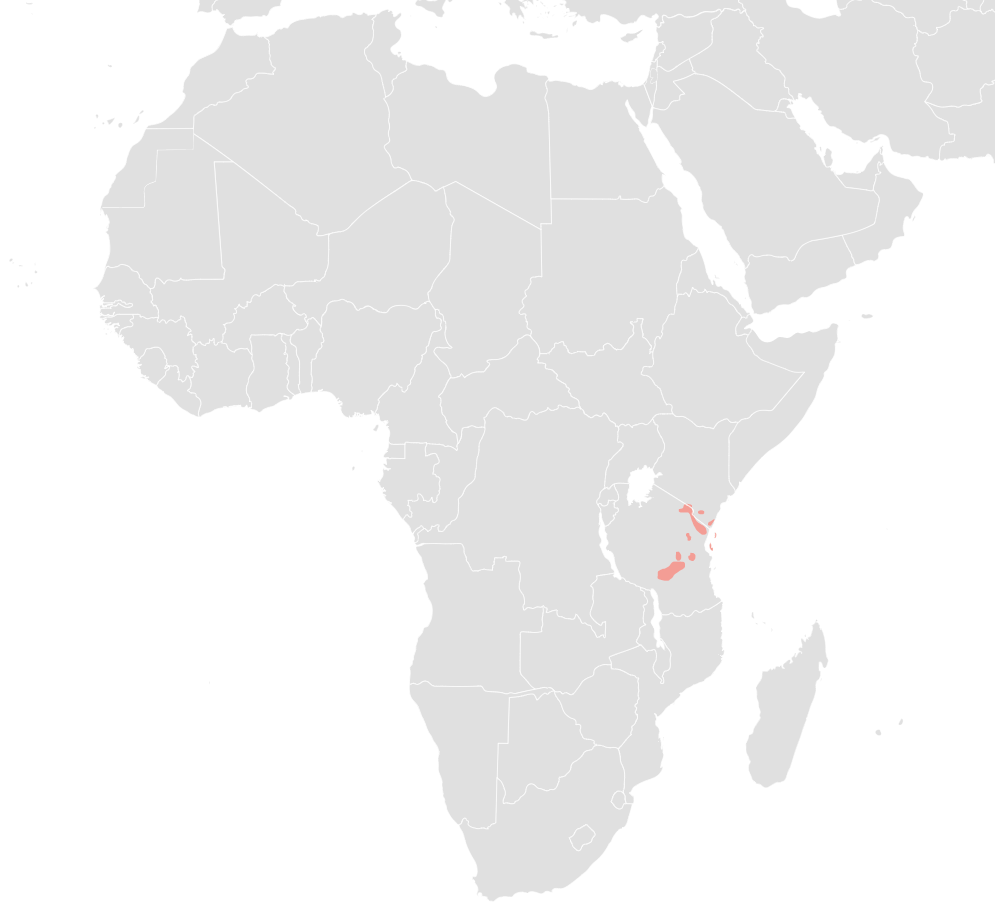
- Eastern tree hyrax range

= Eastern tree hyrax =

Species of mammal

The eastern tree hyrax (Dendrohyrax validus) is a species of mammal within the family Procaviidae. The eastern tree hyrax is the most localized of the tree hyrax species, distributed patchily in a narrow band of lowland and montane forests in Kenya and Tanzania and adjacent islands.

== Description ==
The eastern tree hyrax is a small, rotund guinea pig–like mammal with dense, soft fur and blunt, nailed toes. They weigh on average 2.75 kilograms or 6.1 pounds and have a head-body length of 470 to 558 millimetres (18.5 to 22.0 in). No tail is discernible. Pelage is variable, with dorsal coloration ranging from cinnamon brown to blackish, and a paler underside. Individuals also have a distinctive dorsal scent gland marked by a contrasting, light-colored patch of hairs. Considerable variation exists between subspecies as currently described. The rostrum is relatively long, but well-haired, unlike the related western tree hyrax. Individuals of this species are difficult to distinguish from the related southern tree hyrax, which was previously considered conspecific; however, the fur of southern tree hyrax is usually more grizzled.

== Behavior ==
The eastern tree hyrax is solitary, living in tree holes, and communicates with other individuals via repetitive vocal calls and scent marking. This is a highly vocal species with numerous high energy calls that may be combined and graded. Most roosts are occupied by only one animal, with the exception of females with one young. They are skilled climbers which feed predominantly in the canopy on tree leaves, and form large middens adjacent to roost trees. In some locations in the coast of Kenya eastern tree hyraxes also inhabit rocky boulders and caves, that resemble rock hyrax habitats. In Pare Mountains Tanzania, eastern tree hyraxes are also inhabiting rocky mountain sides and caves. So tree hyraxes are dependent of their shelter, but they can be flexible of the form of shelter. Tree hyraxes feed on leaves of trees, these trees or bushes may also be small, but they do not feed on exotic trees grown in the tree plantations.

Eastern tree hyrax is one of few species that can sing. Singing is most common in February and June.

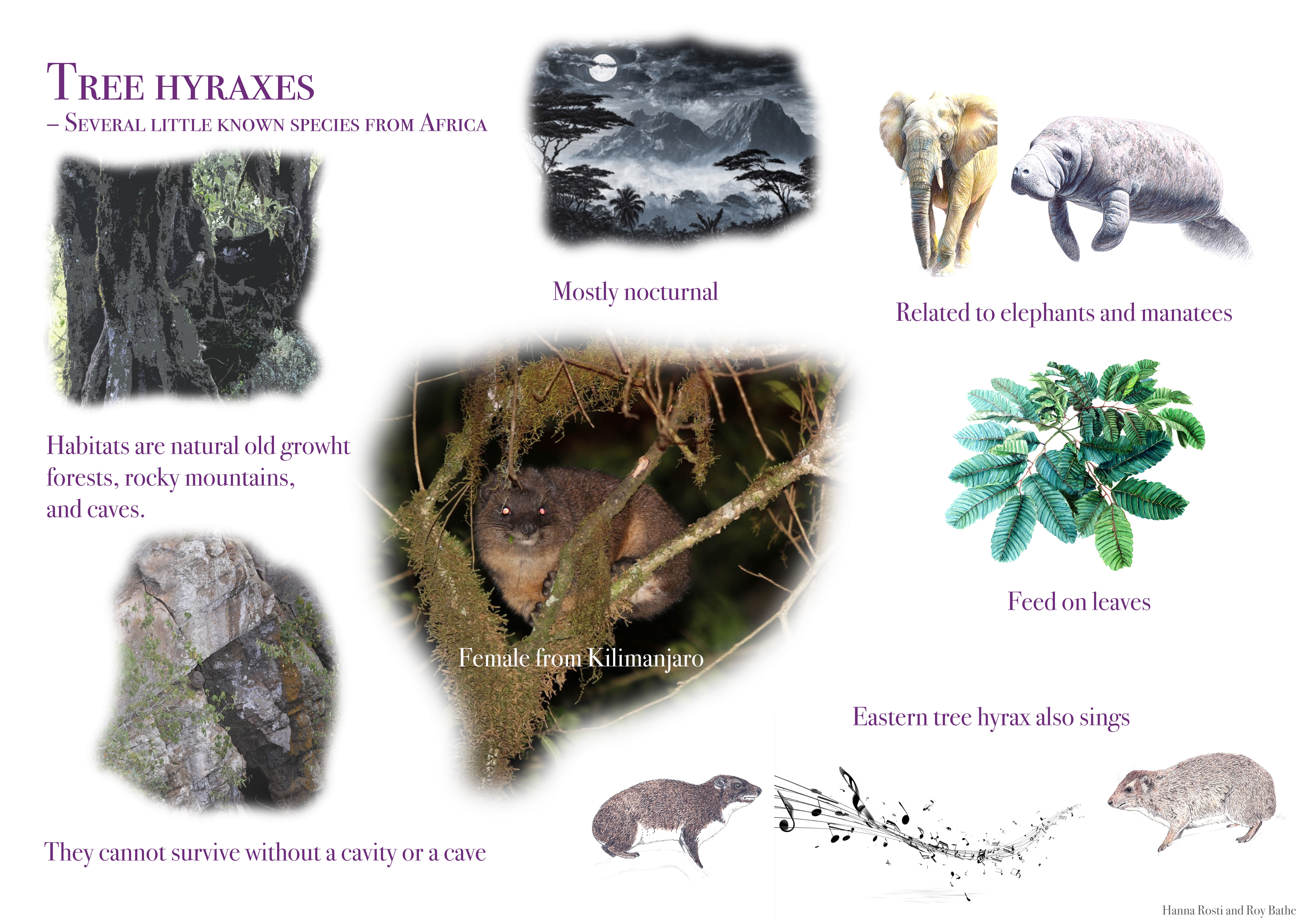
Basic information of eastern tree hyraxes

== Ecology ==
Eastern tree hyraxes are largely restricted to montane forests, but also occur in adjacent lowland forests and even tropical dry forests on coral in Zanzibar and Pemba. They are most abundant at lower elevations, but occur as high as 3,070 metres (10,070 ft) on Mt. Kilimanjaro, albeit in reduced densities due to the scarcity of large trees.

In 2015, the International Union for Conservation of Nature (IUCN) designated the eastern tree hyrax as Near Threatened (NT). Its main threats include deforestation and hunting, and individuals often fall prey to dogs. Known natural predators include leopard, crowned eagle, and African python.

== Distribution ==
The Eastern tree hyrax is endemic to the East African countries of Tanzania and Kenya; they predominantly inhabit the foothills and montane forests of Mount Kilimanjaro, Mount Meru and the Eastern Arc Mountains. The Eastern Arcs feature an ancient chain of isolated, relict forests, stretching from the Taita Hills of Southern Kenya to the Udzungwa Mountains of Tanzania. Hyraxes are also present on the coast between Tanga Region, Tanzania, and Mombasa, Kenya, as well as on the islands of Zanzibar and Pemba.

== Taxonomy ==
The eastern tree hyrax is currently considered to have four subspecies:

- D. v. validus, found on Mt. Kilimanjaro and Mt. Meru,
- D. v. terricola, found in the Usambara and Pare Mountains,
  - Eastern tree hyraxes in Taita Hills were recently recorded and, based on call structure, likely represent individuals of this subspecies.

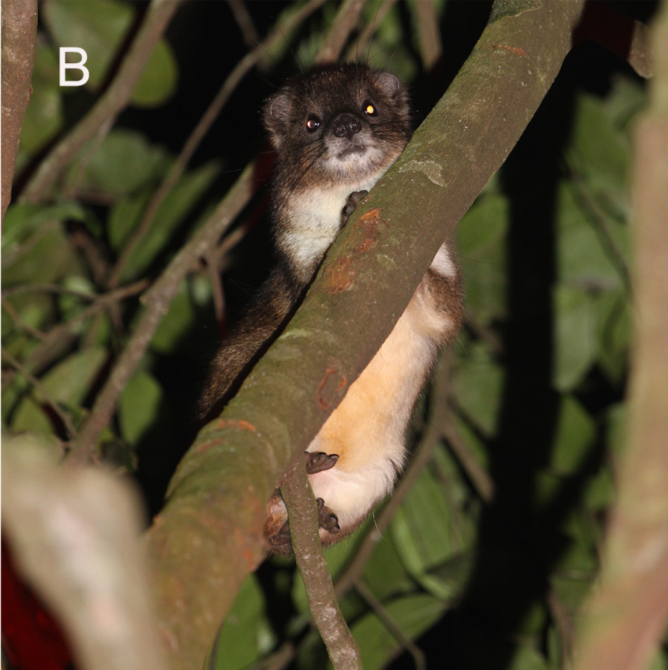
Image of Dendrohyrax found in Taita Hills, Kenya

- D. v. neumannii, found on the islands of Zanzibar and Pemba, and
- D. v. schusteri, found in the Uluguru and likely the Udzungwa and Rubeho mountains.

The subspecific status of relict populations of Eastern Tree Hyrax described from coastal Southern Kenya is currently unclear. These populations have been described as using rock crevices as habitat, contrasting with Dendrohyrax's usually-arboreal behavior.

These subspecies display considerable vocal and morphological variation, thus, some researchers consider eastern tree hyrax to represent a complex of 3–4 distinct species, with further revision required.
