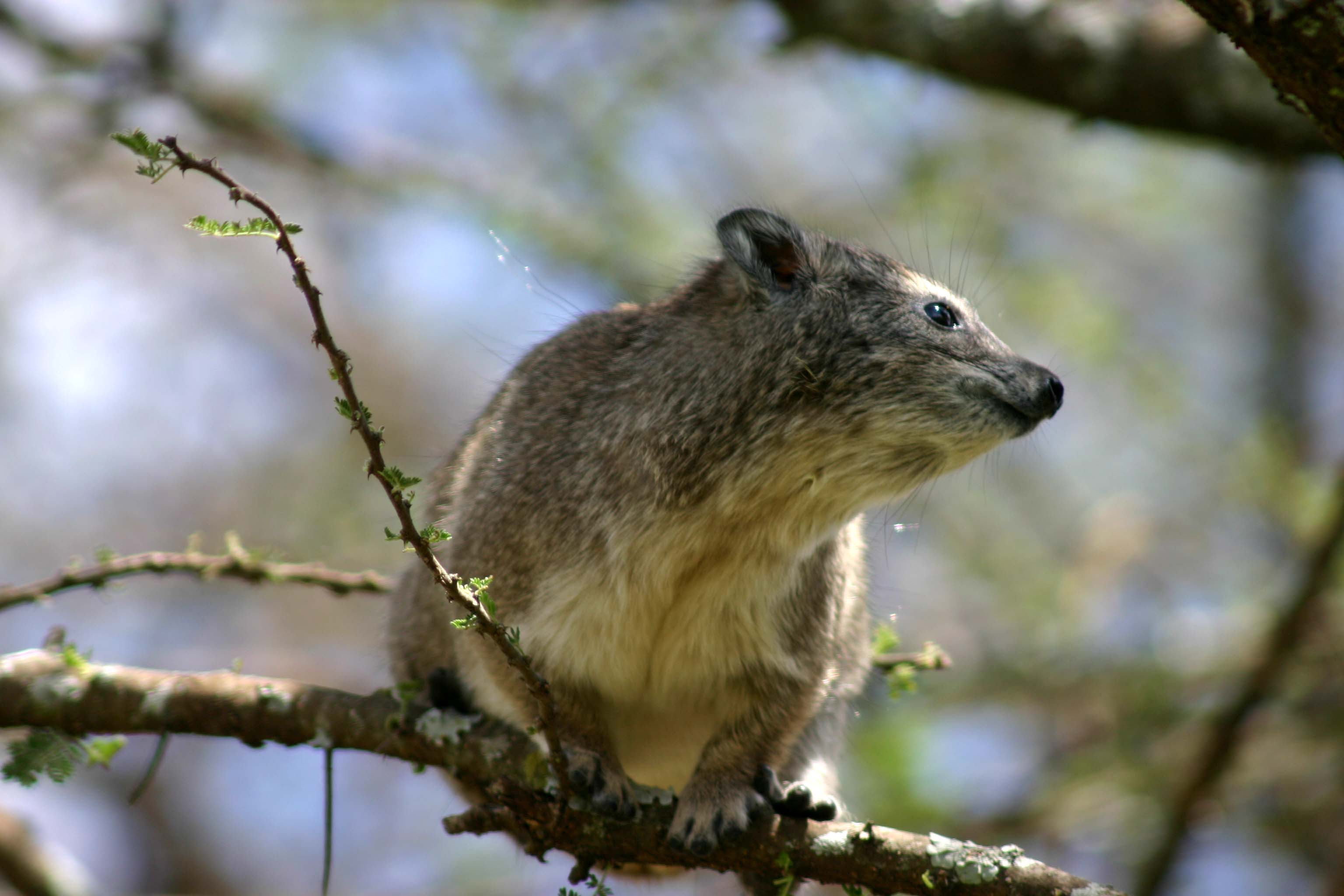

Conservation status
- Least Concern (IUCN 3.1)

Scientific classification
- Kingdom: Animalia
- Phylum: Chordata
- Class: Mammalia
- Infraclass: Placentalia
- Order: Hyracoidea
- Family: Procaviidae
- Genus: Dendrohyrax
- Species: D. arboreus

Binomial name
- Dendrohyrax arboreus (A. Smith, 1827)
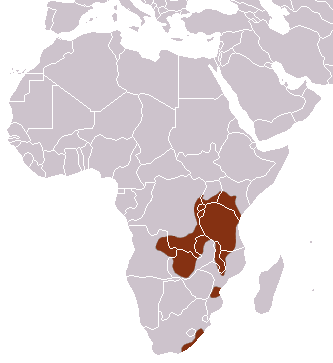
- Southern tree hyrax range

= Southern tree hyrax =

Species of mammal

The southern tree hyrax (Dendrohyrax arboreus), also known as the southern tree dassie, is a species of mammal in the family Procaviidae. The southern tree hyrax is mainly found in the south central eastern side of Africa.

== Description ==
The southern tree hyrax has a guinea pig-like appearance. It has long, soft, grey-brown fur that covers the body, while the underside is paler. Hairs are lighter near their tips and the ears have a fringe of white hair. They weigh about 2.27 kg (5.0 lb) on average, and have an average length of 52 cm (20 in).

== Distribution and habitat ==
It is found in Angola, Zambia, Democratic Republic of the Congo, Kenya, Uganda, Rwanda, Burundi, Tanzania, Malawi, Mozambique, and South Africa. Its natural habitats are temperate forests, subtropical or tropical dry forests, subtropical or tropical moist lowland forests, subtropical or tropical moist montane forests, moist savanna, and rocky areas. It may be found at elevations up to 4,500 m (14,800 ft).

== Behaviour ==
The tree hyrax lives in trees and is mostly nocturnal, as opposed to the rock hyrax which lives among rocks and is mainly diurnal. It occurs singly, in pairs or in small groups, favouring hollow trees and dense foliage. Tree hyrax are extremely able climbers with remarkable balancing skills, they do walk on the ground, but will often 'bounce' along rapidly then stop and then move rapidly again to get to the next piece of cover. Its extraordinary call, heard mainly at night, is a series of blood-curdling shrieks building up to a crescendo. These territorial calls are produced mainly by the males.

== Ecology ==
Martial and tawny eagles, leopards, lions, jackals, spotted hyenas, and even snakes prey upon the southern tree hyrax. In Rwanda, the most common predators are feral dogs. The limited amount of time the hyrax spends on the ground at night may be a predator avoidance strategy. Humans sometimes also eat the hyrax.

The eastern tree hyrax (Dendrohyrax validus) was given ecological classification Near Threatened (NT) in 2015.

== Diet ==
The southern tree hyrax is a herbivore. It consumes many different parts of the plants such as the leaves, petioles, twigs, shoots, fleshy fruit, and hard seeds. Individual species are too many to list, but include Hagenia abyssinica, Hypericum revolutum, and Podocarpus falcatus.

== Reproduction ==
Milner and Harris reported that they were unable to determine the mating system but speculated that it may be facultative monogamy/polygyny.

After a gestation period of 7 months, 1–2 young are born. At birth they are well developed and they weigh 170–200 grams (6.0–7.1 oz). In rescue conditions they can put on around 4% weight gain per day on a cows milk formula, however some youngsters do not thrive on this formula.

Very young hyraxes have poor coordination. At an estimated age of under one week they cannot follow their mothers along a branch, but their mobility skills develop rapidly. Within two weeks they will use a midden. They will eat a diverse range of leaves, shoots, bark, fruit, and flowers. Youngsters appear to learn what leaves to eat by both watching and tasting what the adult is chewing.

At about five months their fur develops darker spots often around guard hairs. The southern tree hyrax reaches maturity at about 12 months old.

== Taxonomy ==
As of 2018, the most recent treatment of the genus Dendrohyrax retains D. validus as a full species.
