= Cyclohexane-1,2-diol =

Names
- Preferred IUPAC name Cyclohexane-1,2-diol
- Other names cis-Cyclohexane-1,2-diol trans-Cyclohexane-1,2-diol

Identifiers
CAS Number	931-17-9; cis: 1792-81-0; trans: 1460-57-7
3D model (JSmol)	Interactive image; cis: Interactive image; trans: Interactive image
ChEBI	CHEBI:24567; cis: CHEBI:32329; trans: CHEBI:16931
ChemSpider	5413674; cis: 83866; trans: 83850
ECHA InfoCard	100.012.027
EC Number	213-229-8
KEGG	cis: C12313; trans: C03739
PubChem CID	13601; cis: 92903; trans: 92886
UNII	P27V53MH26; cis: G9FB3QY86K; trans: 89G7G95Z1Y
CompTox Dashboard (EPA)	DTXSID50871843
- InChI: InChI=1S/C6H12O2/c7-5-3-1-2-4-6(5)8/h5-8H,1-4H2 Key: PFURGBBHAOXLIO-UHFFFAOYSA-N; cis: InChI=1S/C6H12O2/c7-5-3-1-2-4-6(5)8/h5-8H,1-4H2/t5-,6+ Key: PFURGBBHAOXLIO-OLQVQODUSA-N; trans: InChI=1S/C6H12O2/c7-5-3-1-2-4-6(5)8/h5-8H,1-4H2/t5-,6-/m1/s1 Key: PFURGBBHAOXLIO-PHDIDXHHSA-N
- SMILES: C1CCC(C(C1)O)O; cis: C1CC[C@@H]([C@@H](C1)O)O; trans: C1CC[C@H]([C@@H](C1)O)O

Properties
Chemical formula	C_{6}H_{12}O_{2}
Molar mass	116.160 g·mol^{−1}
Melting point	100-103 °C (trans); 98-102 °C (cis)

Hazards
Safety data sheet (SDS)	External MSDS
- Except where otherwise noted, data are given for materials in their standard state (at 25 °C [77 °F], 100 kPa). Infobox references

Cyclohexane-1,2-diol is a chemical compound found in castoreum. It can exist in either cis- or trans-isomers.

The enzyme cyclohexane-1,2-diol dehydrogenase uses trans-cyclohexane-1,2-diol and NAD^{+} to produce 2-hydroxycyclohexan-1-one, NADH and H^{+}.
