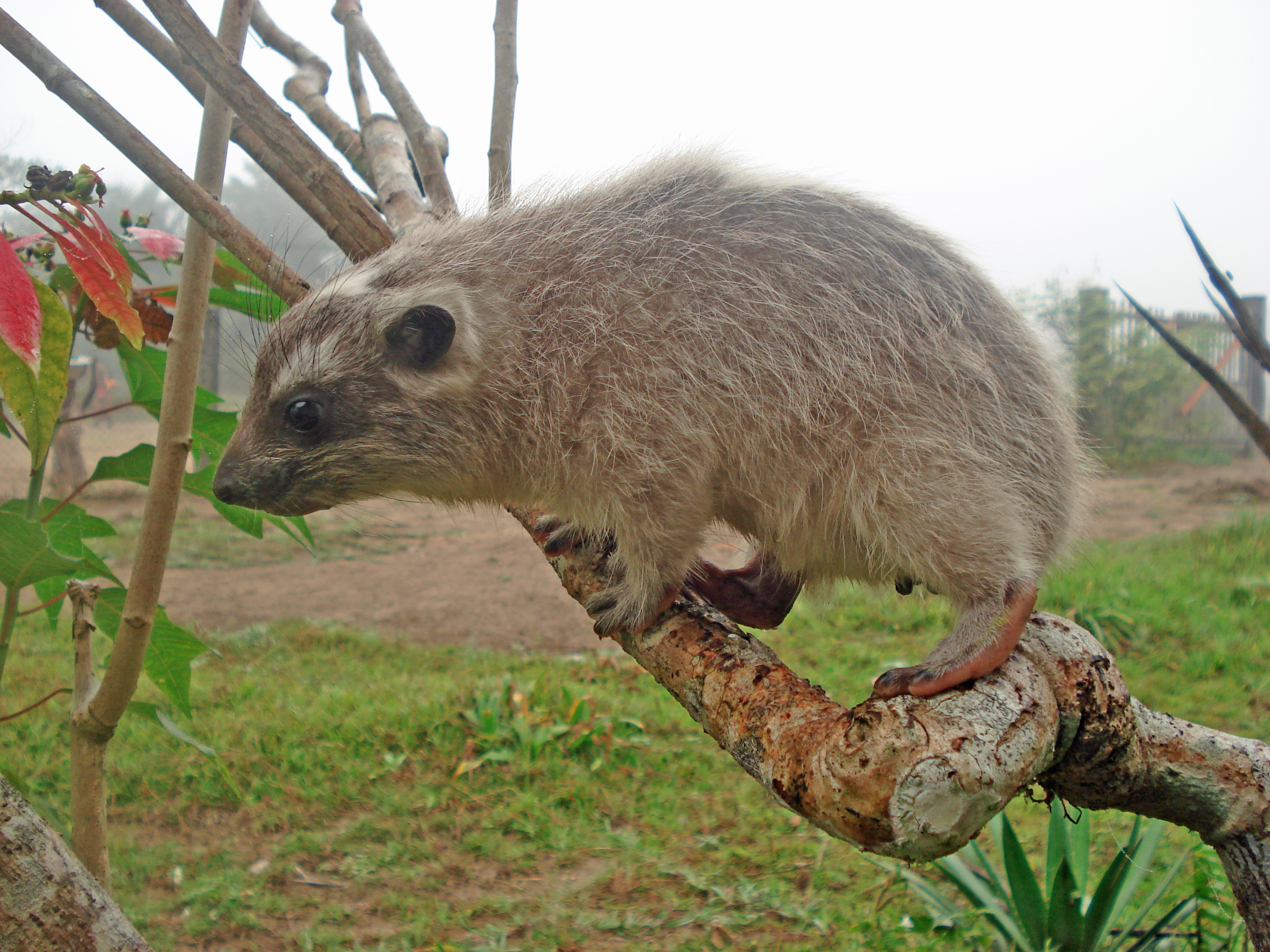
- Western tree hyrax, Dendrohyrax dorsalis

Scientific classification
- Kingdom: Animalia
- Phylum: Chordata
- Class: Mammalia
- Order: Hyracoidea
- Family: Procaviidae
- Genus: Dendrohyrax; J. E. Gray, 1868

Type species
- Hyrax arboreus A. Smith, 1827

Species
- Dendrohyrax arboreus; Dendrohyrax dorsalis; Dendrohyrax interfluvialis; Dendrohyrax validus
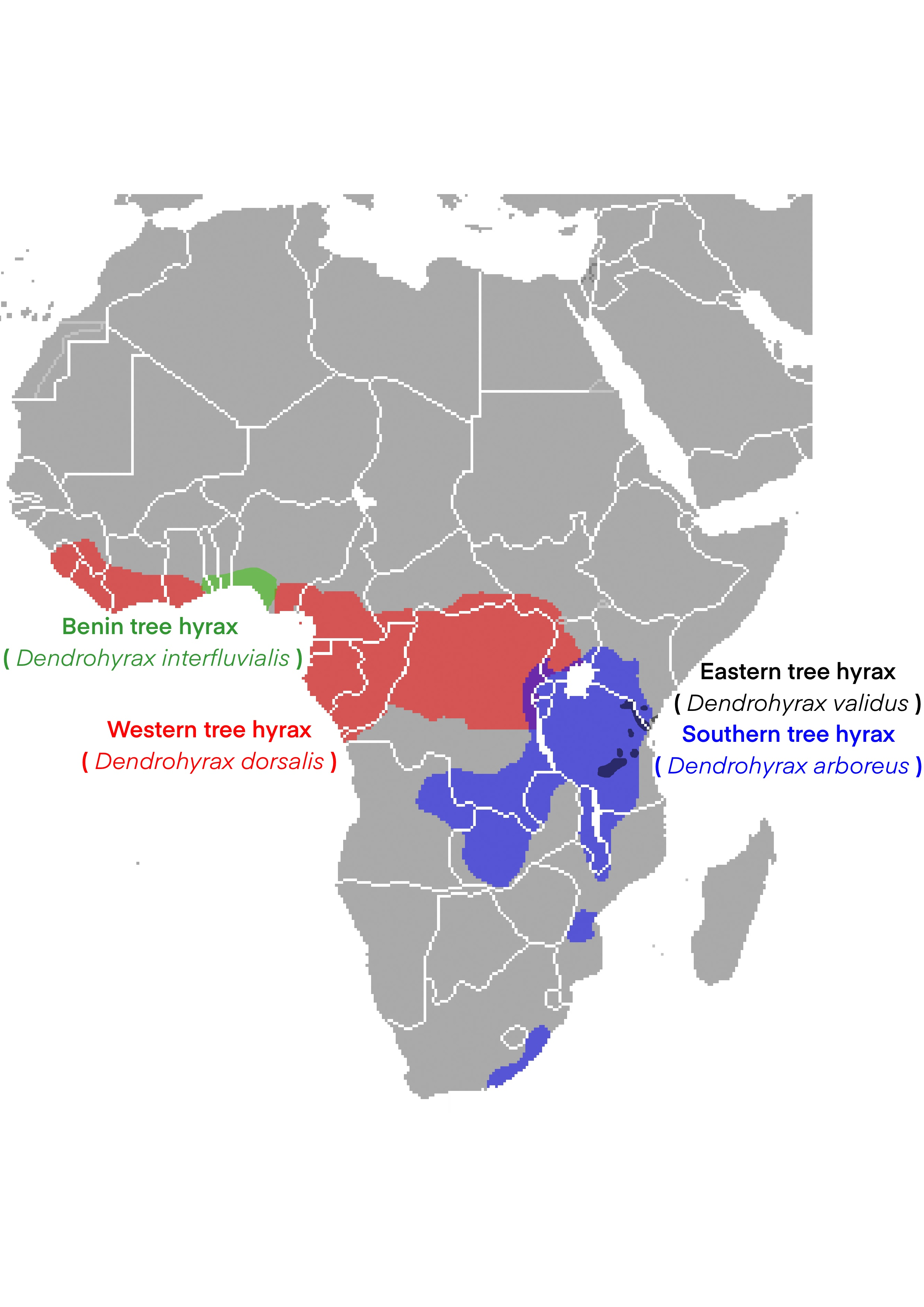

= Tree hyrax =

Tree hyraxes

Genus of small nocturnal mammals native to Africa

The tree hyrax or tree dassie is a small nocturnal mammal native to Africa. Distantly related to elephants and sea cows, it comprises the four species in the genus Dendrohyrax, one of only three genera in the family Procaviidae, which is the only living family within the order Hyracoidea.

The four species are:

Image	Common name	Scientific name	Distribution
	Southern tree hyrax	D. arboreus	East and Southern Africa
	Eastern tree hyrax	D. validus	East Africa.
	Benin tree hyrax	D. interfluvialis	West Africa.
	Western tree hyrax	D. dorsalis	West and Central Africa

Analysis of calls found that they could be divided into 'shrieking' hyraxes and 'barking' hyraxes, with the barkers being a genetically distinct fourth species.

The tree hyrax has four-toed front feet and three-toed back feet with rounded nails, and rubbery soles that help it climb.

== Colouring ==
Dependent on geographical location, their soft dense coats can range from a pale gray to light or dark brown. The variation is consistent with evolutionary development to aid with camouflage, so that in wetter regions with more verdant and abundant vegetation, they are darker, and in more arid areas, their colouring is lighter.

== Habitat ==
The habitat of tree hyraxes is mostly in forested places with a mix of older and younger trees. They can be found in elevations up to 4,500 metres or 14,800 feet above sea level.

Despite being more common than the rock hyrax, tree hyraxes are much more difficult to spot, as they are both nocturnal and extremely shy.

=== Habitat assessment ===
Tree hyraxes are nocturnal, arboreal folivores, who make use of cavity-bearing trees as dens in forests where forest fauna decreased due to the change in the structural nature of forests in Eastern Cape, South Africa. Studies which were used to study the specific habitat requirements of fauna in their forest, revealed that the tree hyrax was found to select for den trees with particular characteristics: seven tree species were selected as den trees, which were usually the tallest trees in the canopy. Den trees were usually only partly decayed, with multiple cavity entrances and trunk angles between 45 and 68°. Cavity entrance and orientation did not appear to play a role in den tree selection by Dendrohyrax spp.

== Activity and calling patterns ==
Tree hyraxes were found to be active 16% of the time, during which feeding was their most dominant activity. They mostly feed themselves on leaves of Hagenia abyssinica. Of the 16% active time, 4% of the time was used travelling between trees predominantly during daylight hours. They have calling behavior that is strongly prevalent in the dry season. The hyrax calls regularly in the early evening, and often a second time later at night; during rains, though, their calls become infrequent.

== Diet ==
The tree hyrax diet is plant-based and varies depending on geographical location. In one South African forest, their principal foods were Schotia latifolia, Cassine aethiopica, and Eugenia natalensis.

== Territorial call ==
Each of the four species of tree hyrax has a distinct territorial call. In D. validus, it starts with a series of loud, measured cracking sounds, sometimes compared to "a huge gate with rusted hinges being forced open". This is then followed by a series of "unearthly screams", ending in a descending series of expiring shrieks. Females also call, but lack the air pouches and enlarged larynges of the males. Typically, two peak calling periods occur per night. Times vary, but the first period is often 2–3 hours after dark, and the second at some point after midnight.
