= Rock hyrax midden =

Petrified hyrax excrement accumulation

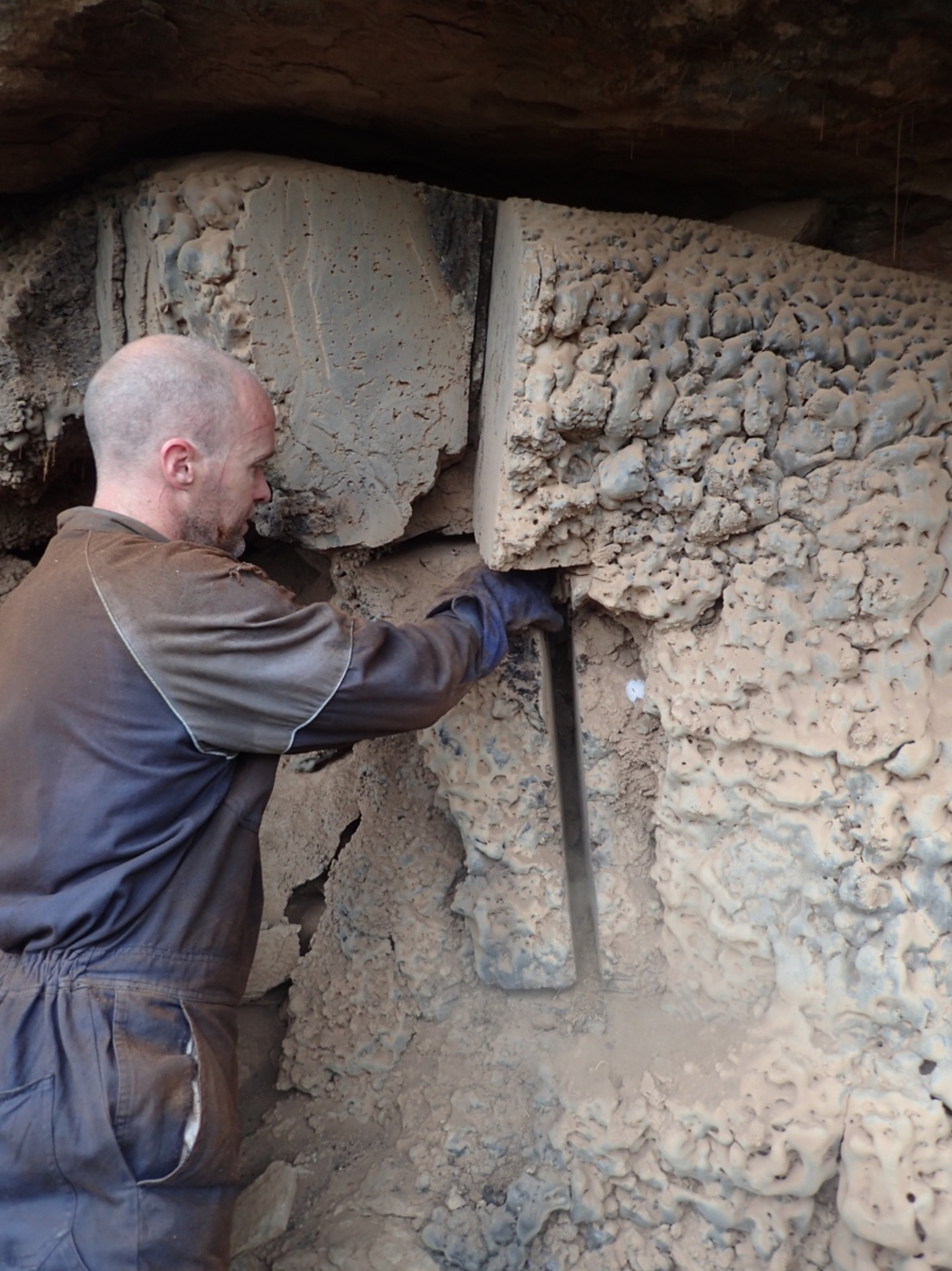
Sampling a rock hyrax midden from the Gifberg Pass, Western Cape, South Africa

A rock hyrax midden is a stratified accumulation of fecal pellets and a brown amber-like urinary product known as hyraceum excreted by the rock hyrax and closely related species.

Hyrax middens form very slowly (ranging from ~5 years to >1000 years for 1 mm of hyraceum accumulation), over long periods of time, with many spanning tens of thousands of years and some dating as far back as ~70,000 years. Hyrax middens contain a diverse range of paleoenvironmental proxies, including fossil pollen and stable carbon, nitrogen and hydrogen isotopes. Combined with the antiquity of hyrax middens, and the often-continuous nature of their deposition, hyrax middens have become a valuable means of reconstructing past environmental and climate change.

Rock hyraxes are known to use communal latrines. These sites are often found in sheltered locations, where the threat of predation is limited, and middens form when they are protected from the elements. At well-protected sites, it may accumulate in deposits in excess of a meter thick and several meters across. The thickness of hyrax middens depends on the nature of the shelter and the regional climate history and geology. Hyraceum shows hygroscopic properties and periods of increased precipitation or elevated ambient humidity will destroy existing middens, while more arid periods allow their development/preservation. Thicker formations tend to occur in shallow shelters that during more arid periods, presumably provided sufficient shelter from rainfall for substantial midden accumulations, but under wetter conditions no longer provide adequate protection, resulting in the removal of the more soluble components of the midden. At poorly protected sites in arid regions hyrax urine leaves a white, calcium carbonate precipitate on the rocks. Varying degrees of protection result in varying degrees of midden preservation. Small overhangs, vertical fractures in cap rocks, and groundwater flow along weakness in the shelter's architecture may lead to midden degradation if rainfall exceeds a certain amount and/or intensity. The thickest middens have been found at sites composed of massive, horizontally bedded rock such as granite and quartzites with between ~30 and 480 mm of annual rainfall. In more humid environments (>800 mm mean annual rainfall), there is little to no evidence of hyraceum accumulation, and middens typically resemble piles of compost, as the masticated plant material in the pellets rapidly decomposes. Hyraceum-rich middens do not typically form in coastal situations, despite the presence of hyraxes, and it is considered that the ambient humidity of the air and the occurrence of coastal fogs preclude midden development

== Comparisons with fossilised herbivore middens ==
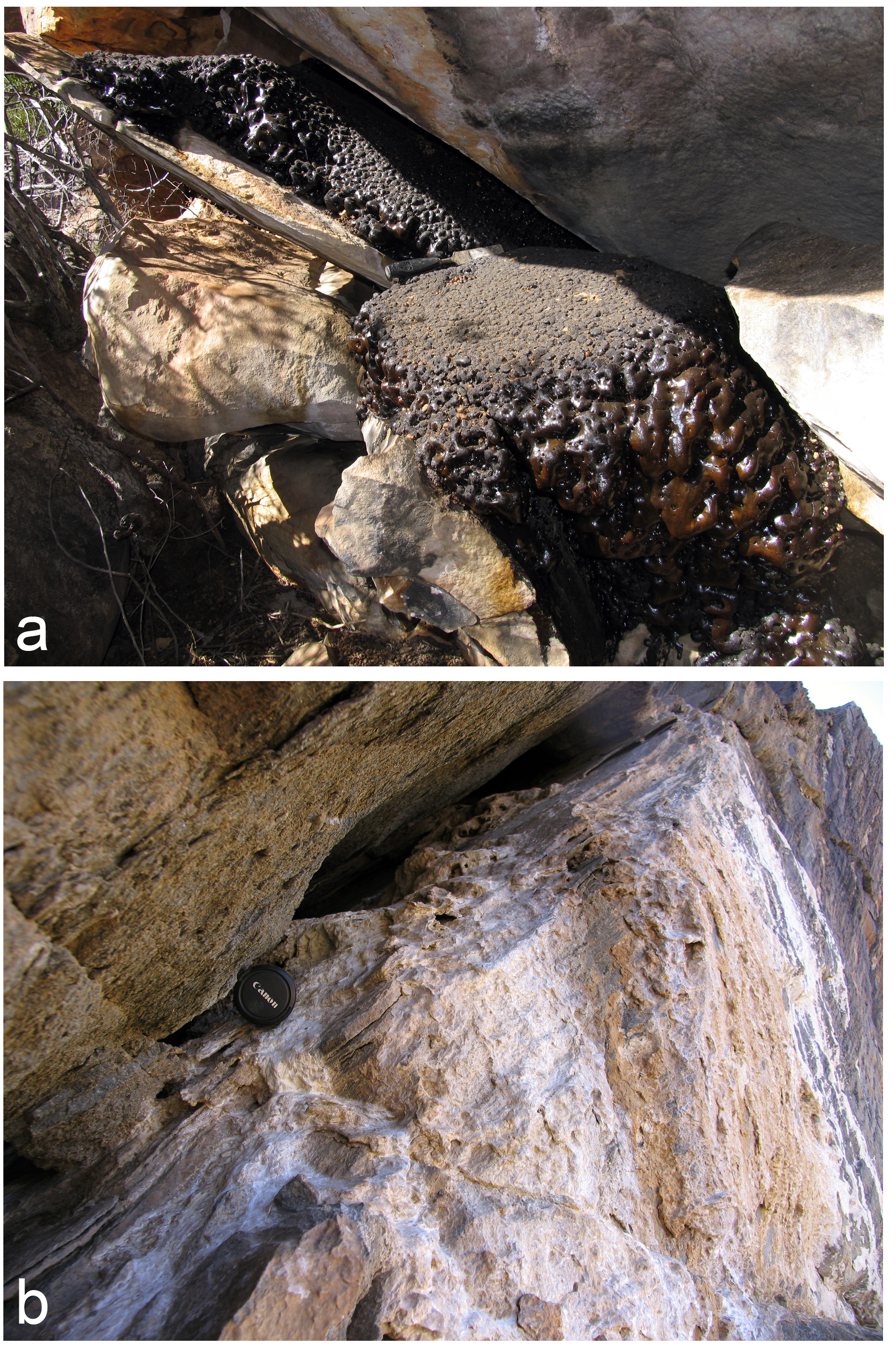
Examples of rock hyrax middens, with (a) a well-preserved 75 cm thick midden found under a large overhang in the Cederberg Mountains of South Africa, and (b) a degraded midden found on an exposed ledge in the Purros region of Namibia.

Studies of other herbivore midden remains have been very effective in palaeoenvironmental studies in dryland regions on several continents. In the southwestern United States pack rat middens have provided an unprecedented record of environmental changes over the last 40,000 years. As a result of this work, the vegetation dynamics of this area are some of the best understood for any of the world's drylands at this timescale, and the critical data provided have dramatically helped define the range of regional climate variability. This work has also led to important perspectives on ecological theory, which have impacted on management strategies by allowing a distinction to be made between anthropogenic environmental impacts and natural processes.

Midden studies have also been undertaken in Australia and South America. This work has highlighted a fundamental difference between middens from these regions and hyrax middens. American and Australian middens are essentially nests composed of sticks and other macrobotanical remains. These middens are generally reported have no clear stratigraphy, and researchers have thus adopted the methodology of processing them as single samples that provide a palaeoenvironmental snapshot. Hyrax middens, on the other hand, are primarily urino-fecal deposits, and are deposited progressively as a series of layers. This diachroneity is one of the fundamental advantages of hyrax middens over nest middens, which are only secondarily preserved as the animals urinate in their shelters.

Examinations of the internal and external structure of hyrax middens suggest flow/deposition dynamics similar to speleothems (cave deposits, e.g. stalactites), with the fresh urine flowing across the surface of the midden, then drying and crystallising, preserving the stratigraphic integrity of the midden. The general morphology of middens is often characterised by (1) lobate forms, (2) undulating weathering features on exposed midden faces, and (3) in some cases the formation of thin (1–3 mm in diameter) stalactites on the underside of some middens. As a result, questions over the potential for post-depositional remobilisation of hyraceum may be raised. The examination of over 150 middens, however, has confirmed the visible stratigraphic integrity of the middens, and while some surficial alteration of exposed surfaces can occur, consistently coherent age-depth models, and the nearly vertical exposed external faces of the middens indicate that, once dry, hyraceum is not prone to significant remobilization.

== Hyrax midden structure, accumulation rates and age ==
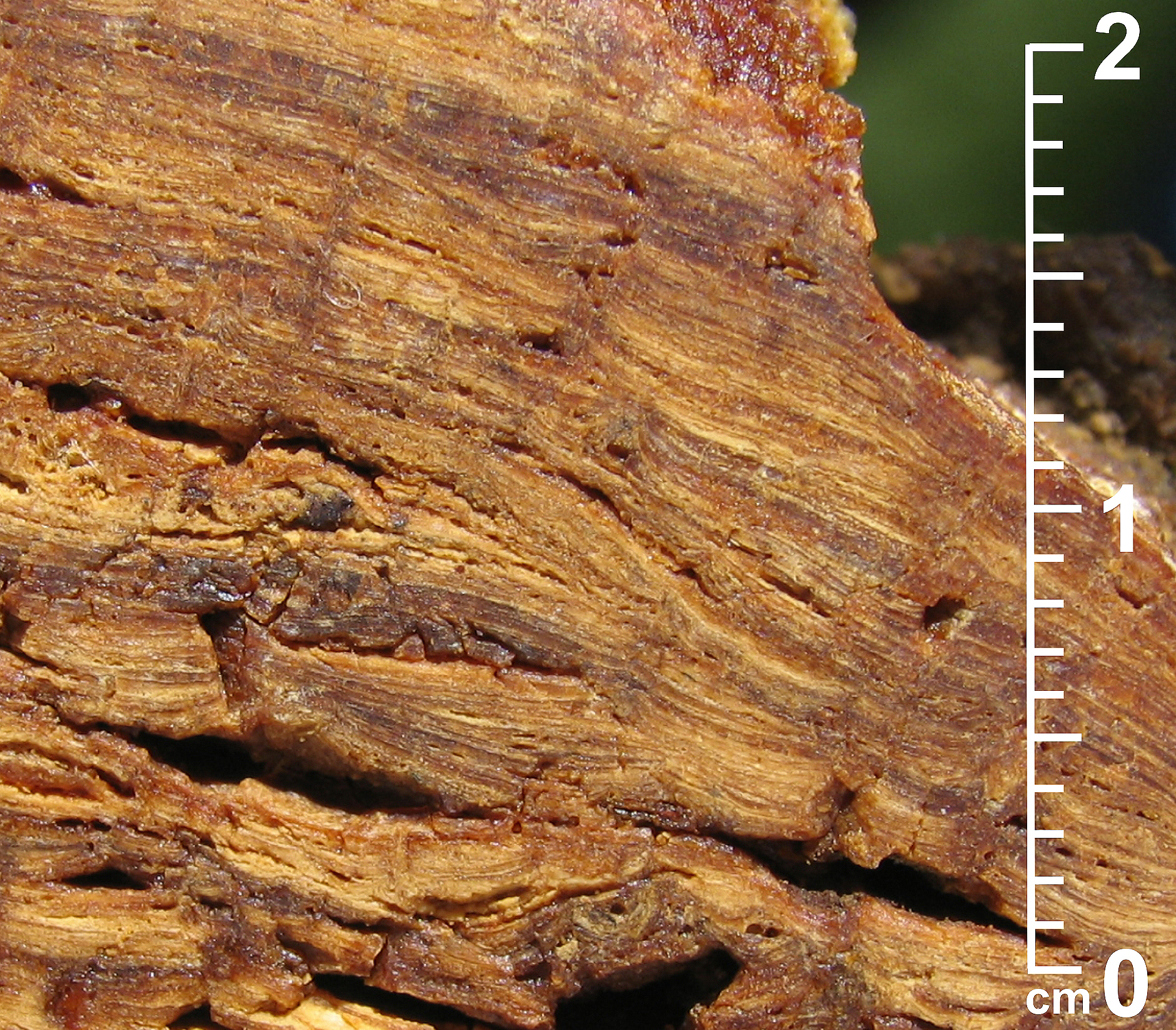
Cross section of a hyrax midden showing finely laminated internal structure.

Hyrax midden structures and accumulation rates can vary considerably based on the relative proportion of their two primary components, pellets and hyraceum, which is determined by the architecture of the site itself. Depending on the shape and irregularities of the floor of the site in question, pellets are likely to either accumulate (in concave structures) or roll away (in convex or inclined structures). Whereas hyrax urine will deposit only a very thin film of hyraceum after evaporation, pellets are usually 0.5–1 cm in diameter, and thereby accumulate much more quickly., with deep piles accumulating perhaps within just a few years, or even months. Compared to this, we have observed that middens composed primarily of hyraceum accumulate much more slowly; generally between ~5 and >1000 years/mm. The rate of hyraceum accumulation depends on the morphology of the midden, the architecture of the site, as well as presumably the size of the hyrax colony, and as such net rates can be highly variable

== Hyrax midden ages ==
Radiocarbon ages from hyraceum are not subject to reservoir effects or the inclusion of new carbon. This is primarily a function of middens being isolated systems, and that through respiration the hyraceum is brought into equilibrium with atmospheric ^{14}C at the time of deposition. Published data show that hyrax middens can be of considerable antiquity, and middens from the Groenfontein site in the Cederberg Mountains of South Africa are considered to have begun accumulating ~70,000 years ago

It has been commonly observed that many middens are no longer actively accumulating. Often this is controlled by the shelters in which they are found, with accumulation ceasing when the middens grow to such an extent that the hyraxes can no longer physically enter the shelters. Until recently, field sampling was limited to the collection of middens that were most accessible and easiest to sample. In many cases this meant that the individual sampled middens were relatively thin (<5 cm) with aggregate records subsequently constructed from fragments of as many as 25 separate middens. (Scott and Woodborne, 2007a, b). With recent developments in sampling tools and techniques, larger, more stratigraphically coherent middens are more regularly sampled, which better represent the full period of accumulation at a given site

== Composition of hyrax middens ==
The very nature of hyrax middens implies that they comprise a mixture of materials, which include animal metabolic products, undigested food, and any allochtonous material blown into the middens or deposited via feet or fur. In terms of organic matter, the existence of such potentially distinct sources (i.e. extraneous organic matter and animal metabolites) implies that a range of information concerning inter alia: animal diet, animal behaviour, metabolic responses to environmental stress, changing behaviour, as well the wider palaeoecological setting of the site may all be preserved within hyraceum.

=== Chemical composition ===
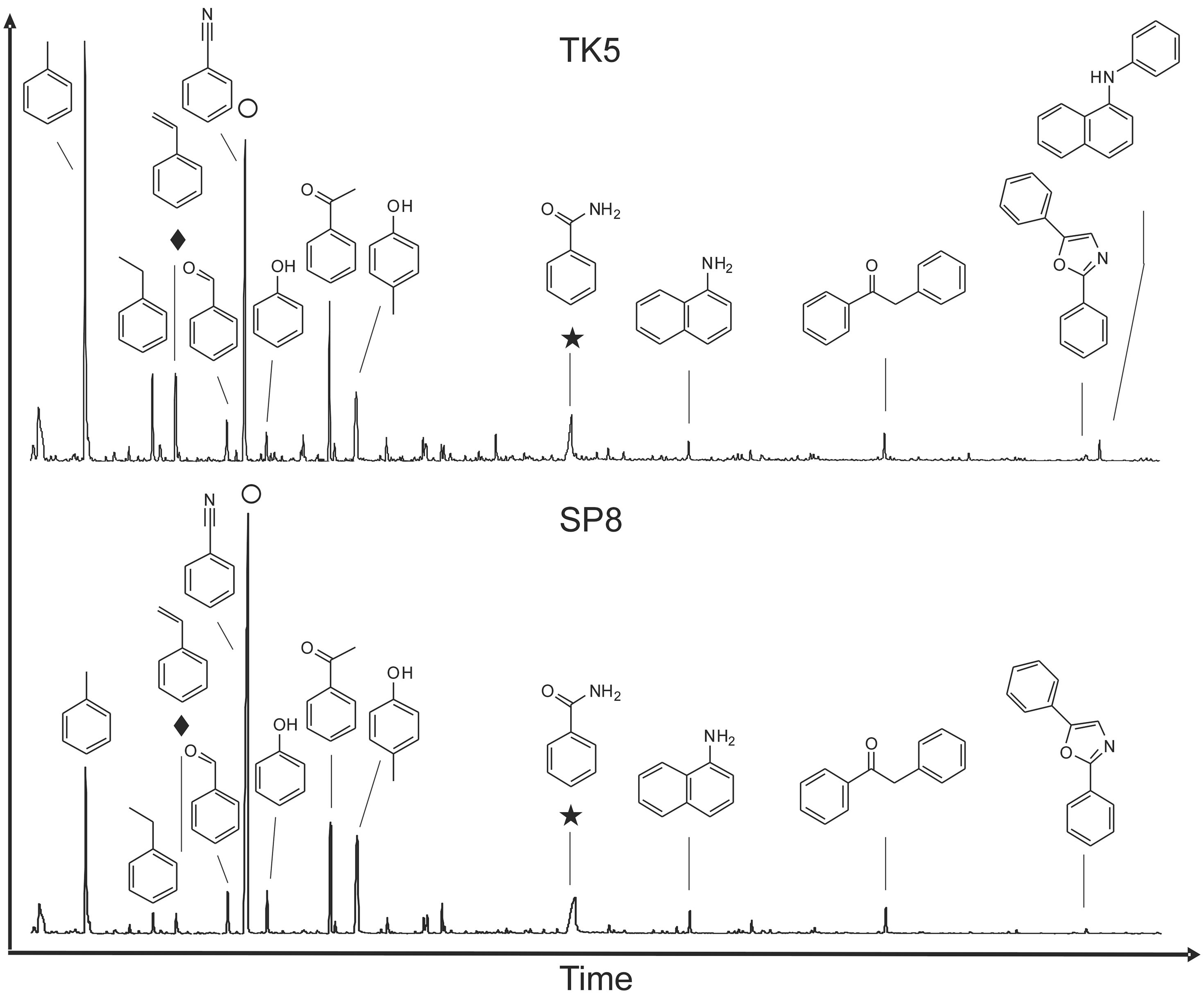
Pyrograms for the Truitjes Kraal (top) and Spitzkoppe (bottom) middens, showing the total ion current (TIC) with no sample pre-treatment.

Hyraceum essentially comprises a mix of organic compounds, soluble salts, calcium carbonate and the mineral sylvite. More recent data from Raman Spectroscopy and Fourier Transform Infrared (FTIR) Spectroscopy demonstrate the presence of a number of CaCO_{3} polymorphs, the abundance of sylvite (KCl) and an organic component

The organic components within hyraceum have been investigated using pyrolysis-GC/MS (py-GC/MS) and GC/MS analysis of solvent-extractable lipids. Py-GC/MS is commonly applied to elucidate macromolecular organic matter structure and composition. Py-GC/MS measurements on samples from two distant sites, Spitzkoppe, Namibia and Truitjes Kraal, Western Cape Province, South Africa produced remarkably similar suites of pyrolysis products, despite their contrasting environmental settings. The pyrolysis products were dominated by aromatic compounds; notably the nitrogenous compounds benzonitrile and benzamide. Pyrolysis in the presence of a methylating agent tetramethylammonium hydroxide (TMAH) implied that benzamide is a monomer of a larger polymeric structure, the major organic component of the hyraceum OM. This is further supported by the ubiquity of benzamide within solvent extracts and it is probable that it is derived from hippuric or benzoic acid, which are common metabolites in ruminants. Given its abundance, the metabolite (or metabolite product) benzamide is likely the major source of organic nitrogen and carbon measured in bulk stable isotope analyses, and can therefore provide insights into animal diet and its isotopic signature. Interestingly, common plant-derived pyrolysis products, such as lignin were not detected using py-GC/MS, although low molecular weight polysaccharide pyrolysis products (e.g. acetyl furan, furaldehyde, dimethyl furan) were found in trace amounts

That such plant-derived compounds might be identified with this technique following more detailed analytical pyrolysis protocols is implied by new FTIR analyses of the organic fraction, which support the basic pyrolysis-based interpretation of Spitzkoppe and Truitjes Kraal midden chemical compositions. The Spitzkoppe FTIR spectra following carbonate removal contains a broad absorption band at w3300 cm1 as well as sharper absorptions from w1600 to 1700, 1400, 1130, 770 and 690 cm^{−1}. Multiplets between 1560 and 1640 cm^{−1} have been reported as being due to NeH bending in primary amines., while a signal at w1650 cm1 is representative of C==O stretches of the amide band. The spectra thus bear a strong resemblance to benzamide. FTIR spectra from the Truitjes Kraal midden, which is rich in faecal material, shows some resemblance to that of cellulose, with strong broad bands at 3400 cm^{−1} and 1050 cm^{−1}, and some weaker broad bands at 1730 and 1670 cm^{−1}. Overall, the FTIR spectra and previous studies reveal a complex mixture of salts and organic compounds, with the latter incorporating aromatics, polysaccharides, amines, amides and other carbonyl-containing compounds. There are also clear similarities with the spectrum of benzamide, particularly at Spitzkoppe, which is consistent with the pyrolysis data

=== Palaeoenvironmental proxies ===
Part of the extraordinary potential of hyrax middens as palaeoenvironmental archives is the large range of proxies that are contained within them. Initially, when their diachronic nature was less evident, they were viewed as the poor relation to the better studied pack rat middens. While pack rat middens are rich in identifiable macrofossils, which can be directly dated and provide high taxonomic resolution, hyrax middens are poor in macroremains. Those that are found are almost exclusively masticated material that has been incorporated into the deposits as faecal pellets. While some studies have analysed these midden components, more recent work suggests that this approach does not maximise the full potential of hyrax middens as palaeoenvironmental archives

Hyrax middens contain a suite of proxies that have the potential to provide clear insights into past climate and vegetation change. Working within the context of the middens' stratigraphy, and building on robust chronologies indicating predictable and consistent accumulation rates, sampling methodologies are now more akin to those applied to speleothems rather than to packrat middens. Whereas the early focus was on small (<1 kg), accessible middens and in some cases in-situ sub-sampling, it is now standard practice to collect larger (10–70 kg) segments of the best-developed middens. The segments are then split and polished in a controlled environment, and subsamples for radiocarbon dating and proxy analysis. That multiple proxies can be analysed from the same subsample allows for direct comparability, and much more reliable insights into the interrelationships between the systems being studied. This is valuable when comparing proxies that reflect vegetation change (e.g. fossil pollen) and those that are primarily influenced by climate (e.g. δ^{15}N), as the relative roles of climatic forcing versus vegetation dynamics related to competitive processes within an ecosystem can be better resolved, resulting in a fuller and more reliable understanding of palaeoenvironmental dynamics

==== Pollen ====
Hyrax middens contain well-preserved micro plant material including pollen, which is sealed in middens by hyraceum, protecting it from microbial activity and decay. The earliest study of fossil pollen from a hyrax midden was undertaken in the late 1950s by Pons and Quézel. in the Hoggar Massif of Algeria, whereas the first palynological analyses of southern African middens were undertaken by Louis Scott during the late 1980s and early 1990s, and demonstrated that hyrax middens are very useful as pollen and microfossil traps and capable of producing detailed palaeoenvironmental sequences from radiocarbon dated and stratified hyrax middens. Subsequently, hyrax middens have become an important archive for fossil pollen analysis in South Africa and Namibia. Studies of fossil pollen in hyrax middens have also been undertaken in Jordan Ethiopia, Yemen and Oman

===== Taphonomy, preservation and concentrations =====
Middens are excellent traps for pollen derived from the local and regional surroundings either via the alimentary channel of the animals (excreted in pellets) or via deposition on the middens. The airborne pollen rain is incorporated by (1) collecting on the surface of the midden, (2) being brought in on the fur of the hyraxes, or (3) being ingested as dust on dietary items such as plant leaves or drinking water. The dietary component may also represent the ingestion of flowers, which may result in the occasional over-representation of pollen of certain plant species in the pellet fraction of certain middens. A clear benefit of midden pollen spectra over wetland pollen spectra is that they may more clearly reflect terrestrial vegetation, without the high proportions of hydrophilic elements found in wetland sequences, which is particularly problematic in some dryland pollen records. Furthermore, as the pollen found in hyraceum is not exclusively wind-transported, usually under-represented entomophilous plants are more clearly represented.

Preservation of pollen sealed in hyraceum is usually very good, but the degradation of pollen grains has been occasionally observed in loose pellets or middens semi-exposed to the elements, such as in dolerite shelters in the central grassland region of South Africa, where some Asteraceae pollen have apparently lost their ektexine (L. Scott, unpublished observation). Compared to other available palaeoarchives in the region, such as fluvial sediments or paleosols, and to more widely used pollen records from peat bog and lakes, middens contain high fossil pollen concentrations; usually between 1 and 2 × 10^{5} pollen grains per gram of sample. Pollen concentrations are high even in poorly productive ecosystems such as the Namib Desert margins. Concentrations increase markedly when analysing pollen contents from pellets, reaching 5–30 × 10^{5} pollen grains/gram of sample.

====== Interpretation of pollen data ======
There are some potential drawbacks for the palynological analysis of middens, however, as the diverse taphonomic vectors can complicate interpretations if they are not adequately considered and controlled for. Pollen spectra from pellets – reflecting the animal's needs or preferences on a particular day – may contrast strongly with pollen spectra preserved in hyraceum, and which thought to be primarily brought to the midden via the fur of the hyraxes (which is collected as it moves through the vegetation around its shelter) and the wind. The degree to which dietary biases affect pollen spectra in pellets is a subject that is not fully understood. While Scott and Cooremans have shown that at the biome scale, fresh pellets reflect vegetation of the region from which they were collected, including the seasonal variations within vegetation types, most published studies also indicate significant differences both between modern pellets, and between modern pellets and surface sediment samples from the same site. A number of options might explain this, but it is assumed that as any given pellet represents what was eaten in the last day(s), there will be substantial inter-seasonal and inter-annual variation in the pollen preserved.

In most fossil pollen archives, wind-pollinated plants may dominate the natural pollen rain. Pollen production, however, is likely to have a less significant influence on the pollen that hyraxes ingest, and considering the wide variety of plants that they may eat, it may be possible to control for the taxon over-representation resulting from a production bias while still attaining a reasonable representation of the local vegetation.

A study from the Lower Omo Basin of Ethiopia collected several dozen pellets from different areas around the study site, aggregated them into a single sample, and compared them to the local vegetation.

Structured studies to clarify the relative influence of regional (aeolian) and local (fur) signals in the pollen preserved in hyraceum remain to be completed. At least in some cases, aeolian inputs appear to be negligible as some middens that have accumulated in vertical cracks – precluding the incorporation of pellets and direct contact with the animals – have been found to be devoid of pollen. If aeolian pollen does represent a small percentage of the pollen preserved in hyraceum then it might be inferred that hyraceum pollen assemblages reflect primarily local vegetation cover from within the animals' primary feeding range.

==== Stable isotopes ====
As hyrax middens have been developed as palaeoenvironmental archives, there has been increasing emphasis on the application of stable isotope analyses to midden sequences. Initially this focussed on the use of bulk ^{13}C data, with an emphasis on identifying changes in the relative abundance of C_{3}/C_{4}/CAM vegetation and associated palaeoecological/palaeoenvironmental inferences. This is useful in climatic transition zones, such as the Western Cape Province of South Africa, where modern rainfall seasonality has a strong impact on C_{3}/C_{4} grass distributions. δ^{13}C records can also be used in some ecoregions, such as the dry savannah at Spitzkoppe in Namibia, as an indicator of the reliability of grass cover. As hyraxes will preferentially graze (grasses are C_{4} in the region), more depleted δ^{13}C values from hyrax middens have been interpreted as evidence that the animals were forced to obtain a greater proportion of their diet from trees and shrubs, which are less susceptible to extended periods of drought. However, these data do not necessarily provide a direct and unambiguous indicator of past arid/humid shifts. As such, other studies have focussed on the use of δ^{15}N data as a potential proxy for water availability in the environment

==== δ^{15}N of hyrax middens as an indicator of past hydrologic change ====
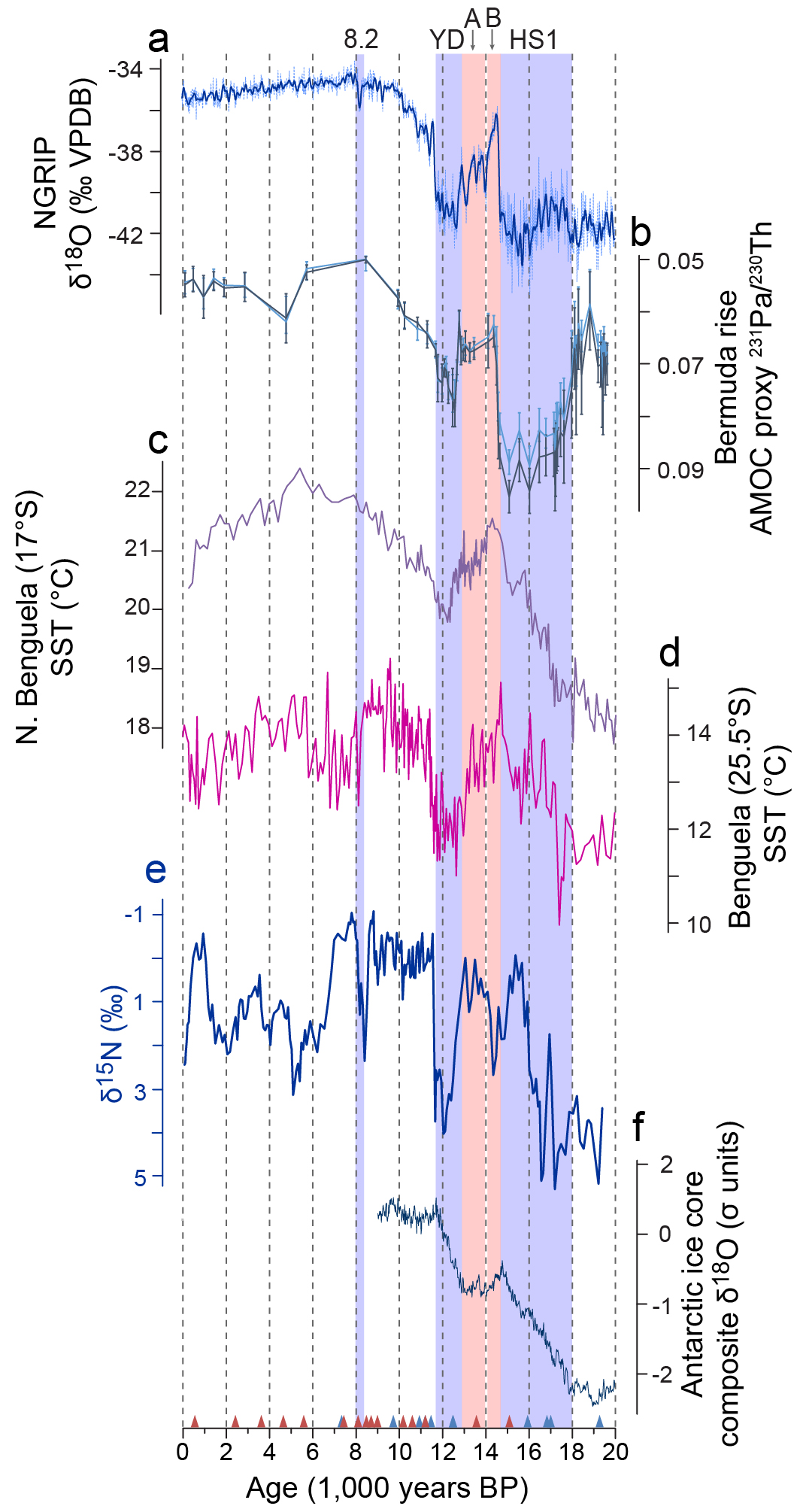
Comparison of proxy records from the De Rif rock hyrax midden with independent regional and extra-regional records reflecting changes in a series of related climate systems during the last 20,000 years. Radiocarbon ages shown as triangles along x-axis. Heinrich stadial 1 (HS1), the Younger Dryas cold reversal (YD) and 8.2 ka event are highlighted by blue shading, and the Bølling (B) and Allerød (A) interstadials are shaded in red. Climatic perturbations in the North Atlantic basin are recorded in the NGRIP ice core record from Greenland (a) (North Greenland Ice Core Project members, 2004) and have been observed to have a significant impact on the Atlantic Meridional Overturning Circulation (AMOC) and the northward oceanic transport of heat (b), resulting in an antiphase relationship between northern (a) and southern (f) hemisphere temperatures. While from ~18–14.6 ka this trend may have been expressed in SE Atlantic (c, d) and from the De Rif hyrax midden in SW Africa (e), variability in the intensity of the South Atlantic Anticyclone (c, d) provide a coherent complementary mechanism, and highlight the increasing importance of atmospheric teleconnections with the North Atlantic in driving SW African climate change across the deglacial period.

In palaeoclimatology, the variables for which reconstructions are most often sought are humidity and temperature. Unfortunately, direct, or even reliable, proxies for these are rarely available, and it is necessary to make several inferential steps in order to interpret their past variability. Recent work on hyrax middens has shown that δ^{15}N records from middens may provide a clearer, more direct estimation of water availability than previously possible in southern Africa, e.g.

As described by Chase et al. it has long been understood that the ^{15}N abundance in animal tissues is influenced by diet, climate and/or physiology. In terms of diet, a clear distinction exists between δ^{15}N values in carnivores and herbivores, with enrichment in ^{15}N occurring up trophic levels. Among herbivores, a link between increased δ^{15}N values in animal tissues and aridity was identified very early, but it was thought to be predominantly a function of the animals' metabolism. Ambrose and DeNiro, based in part on the apparent lack of relationship between ^{15}N/^{14}N ratios in plants and the amount of rainfall, developed a model to account for the enrichment of ^{15}N in animal tissues based on physiological mechanisms of water conservation and nitrogen isotope mass balance. In this model, under arid conditions drought-tolerant herbivores concentrate their urine and excrete more ^{15}N-depleted urea, leaving the body enriched in ^{15}N. Conversely, water-dependent species that do not concentrate their urine were observed to have smaller δ^{15}N ranges and lower mean values in their tissues. This predicted differentiation between drought-tolerant and water-dependent species, however, only found partial support in South Africa. This study suggested that animals in arid regions are likely to eat lower protein diets (%N decreases with increasing aridity), and that the additional protein produced by symbiotic bacteria in the animals' digestive tracts would essentially result in a shift in trophic level and an enrichment of ^{15}N in the animals' tissues. Similarly, Codron and Codron found no significant difference in faecal δ^{15}N between drought-tolerant and water-dependent herbivores, but did identify a significant correlation between %N and δ^{15}N.

In contrast to the initial findings of Heaton et al., subsequent studies of soils and plants across aridity gradients, indicate a clear negative correlation between ^{15}N and rainfall. As this was the original impetus for the construction of the mass balance model and its corollaries, these models, and their implications for interpreting δ^{15}N records in plant and animals tissues, should be reconsidered. Although a strong relationship has been established between soil and plant δ^{15}N, the link with rainfall is sometimes considered to be less robust (e.g.). One of the primary difficulties in determining the relationship between precipitation and δ^{15}N values in soils, plants, animal tissues and excrement is the means by which precipitation is determined. It has been noted by Handley et al. that δ^{15}N in soils and plants may change substantially across a landscape as a function of variations in soil moisture. Since soil moisture varies as a result of subtle changes in topography, aspect and soil type, particularly in drylands where sparse vegetation and poorly-formed soils exacerbate the heterogeneity of the biogeochemical landscape, the common practice of using rainfall records from the nearest gauge and/or interpolated from regional stations will inevitably weaken the significance of any correlation. Soil moisture and δ^{15}N also vary significantly over short, sub-seasonal timescales and, combined, these fine-scale spatio-temporal variations need to be adequately controlled for if reliable δ^{15}N-climate correlations are to be identified.

If we accept that plant δ^{15}N is determined by soil δ^{15}N, and the link with climate, while identified, has been imperfectly explored, it remains to determine to what extent variations in plant d^{15}N account for the variations identified in animal tissue and/or excrement. Murphy and Bowman investigated variations in grass and kangaroo bone δ^{15}N from across Australia and demonstrated a remarkably consistent relationship between plant and bone δ^{15}N signals. Moisture availability, through its influence on the isotopic signature of plants/diet, was inferred as the primary control on animal δ^{15}N, with metabolism having no clear effect. It is interesting to note that Ambrose and DeNiro's findings are not inconsistent with these results, as drought-tolerant species can inhabit more arid regions with less regular rainfall (higher, wider δ^{15}N range) while water-dependent animals will be more restricted to well-watered areas (lower, smaller δ^{15}N range). To extend the findings of Murphy and Bowman to the study of excrement and hyrax middens, one can consider the studies of (1) Codron and Codron, which concluded that faecal δ^{15}N correspond to changes in plant δ^{15}N, and (2) Sponheimer et al., which found that, while preferential urinary excretion of isotopically light nitrogen may occur under conditions of disequilibrium, an unstressed animal at "steady state" will have equivalent dietary and excreta δ^{15}N. Since faecal and animal δ^{15}N track plant δ^{15}N, and under normal conditions total excreta δ^{15}N is equivalent to dietary (plant) δ^{15}N, it follows that urinary δ^{15}N, while perhaps more negative relative to dietary δ^{15}N, will reflect trends in plant δ^{15}N and water availability.

Hyrax middens thus provide an optimal archive for the study of δ^{15}N as a proxy for long-term environmental change. The effects of contemporary ecosystem variability are mitigated by the spatial and temporal averaging intrinsic in hyraxes' wide dietary preferences, restricted range, the probable contribution of multiple individuals to a single δ^{15}N sample, and the relatively long periods of time incorporated into each sample. In these archives, microtopographic variations in soil moisture (and thus δ^{15}N) are accounted for by the feeding habits of the hyrax, and it is expected that the spatio-temporal averaging will allow for the reliable identification of long-term changes in water availability as reflected in variations in midden δ^{15}N. Over long timescales (10^{2}-10^{3} yr), this expectation is borne out, and the potential of hyrax middens as diachronic palaeoclimatic records has been supported by strong similarities between variations in δ^{15}N records and a range of palaeoenvironmental proxies reflecting changes in precipitation.
