= Castoreum =

Fluid produced by beavers

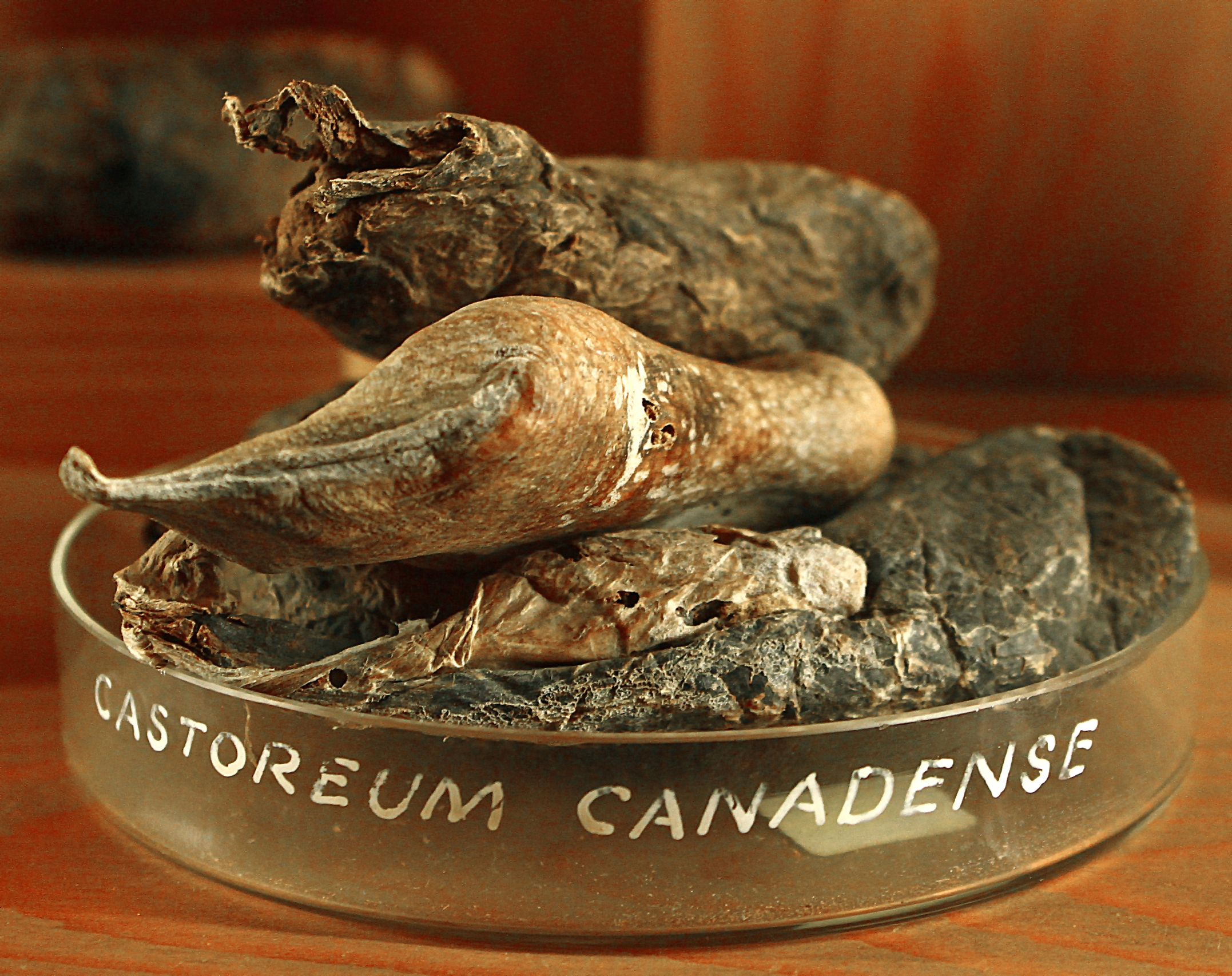
Castoreum

Castoreum /kæsˈtɔːriəm/ is a yellowish exudate from the castor sacs of mature beavers used in combination with urine to scent mark their territory.

Both beaver sexes have a pair of castor sacs and a pair of anal glands, located in two cavities under the skin between the pelvis and the base of the tail. The castor sacs are not true glands (endocrine or exocrine) on a cellular level, hence references to these structures as preputial glands, castor glands, or scent glands are misnomers.

It is extracted with alcohol from the dried and crushed castor sacs for use as a tincture in some perfumes and, rarely, as a food additive.

== Chemical composition ==
At least 24 compounds are known constituents of beaver castoreum. Several of these have pheromonal activity, of which the phenols 4-ethylphenol and catechol and the ketones acetophenone and 3-hydroxyacetophenone are strongest. Five additional compounds elicit a weaker response: 4-methylcatechol, 4-methoxyacetophenone, 5-methoxysalicylic acid, salicylaldehyde, and 3-hydroxybenzoic acid. There are also oxygen-containing monoterpenes such as 6-methyl-1-heptanol, 4,6-dimethyl-1-heptanol, isopinocamphone, pinocamphone, and two linalool oxides and their acetates. Other compounds are: benzoic acid, benzyl alcohol, borneol, o-cresol, 4-(4'-hydroxyphenyl)-2-butanone, hydroquinone, and phenol. All those compounds are gathered from plant food. It also contains nupharamine alkaloids, castoramine, and cis-cyclohexane-1,2-diol.

== Uses ==
=== In perfume ===
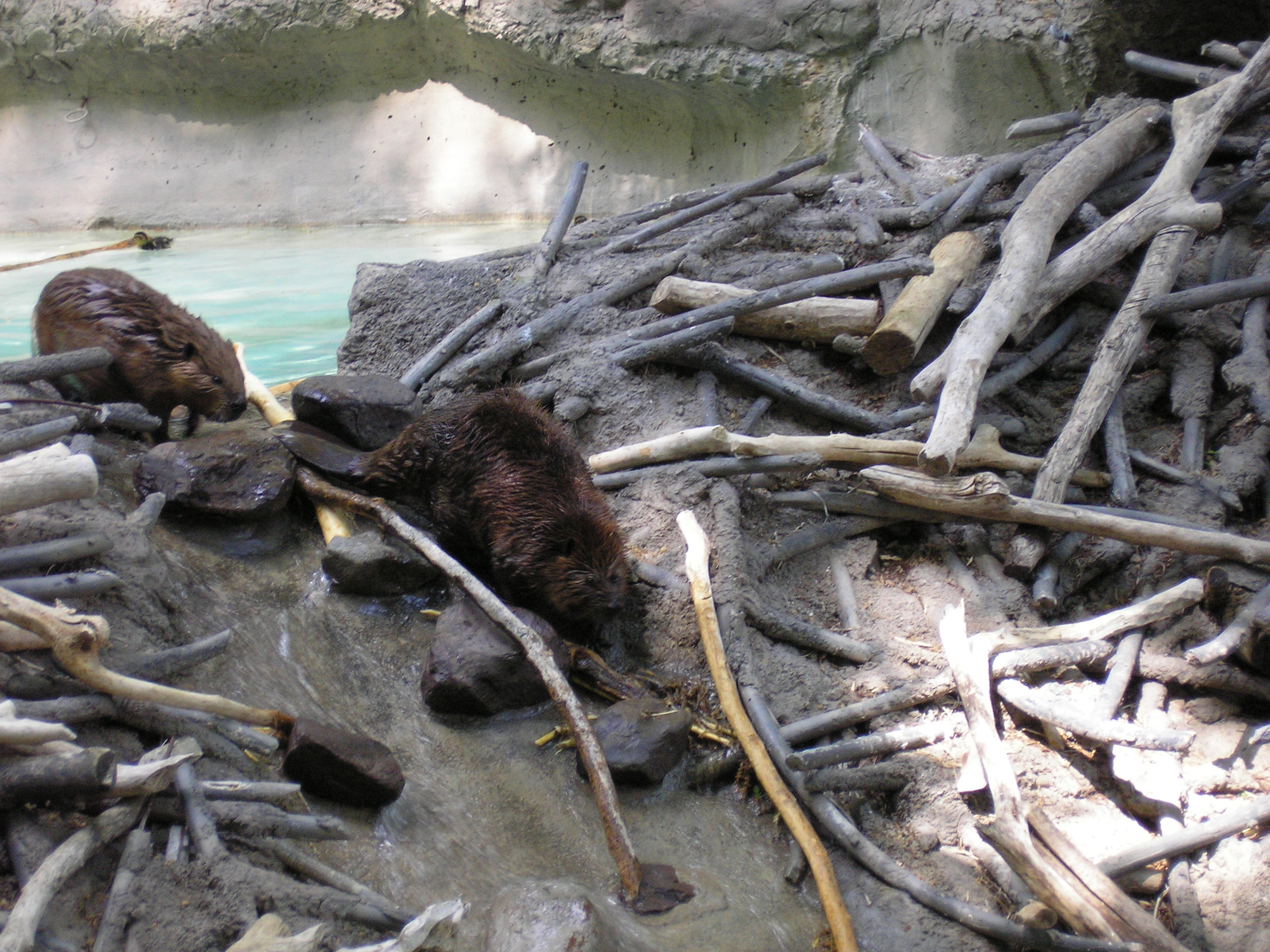
North American beavers at the Smithsonian National Zoo, in Washington, D.C.

In perfumery, the term castoreum refers to the resinoid extract resulting from the dried and alcohol tinctured beaver castor. The dried beaver castor sacs are generally aged for two or more years to mellow.

Castoreum is largely used for its note suggesting leather, typically compounded with other ingredients, including top, middle, and base notes. Some classic perfumes incorporating castoreum are Emeraude, Chanel Antaeus, Cuir de Russie, Magie Noire, Lancôme Caractère, Hechter Madame, Givenchy III, Shalimar, and many "leather" themed compositions.

=== In food ===
In the United States, the Food and Drug Administration lists castoreum extract as a generally recognized as safe (GRAS) food additive. In 1965, the Flavor and Extract Manufacturers Association's GRAS program (FEMA 2261 and 2262) added castoreum extract and castoreum liquid. Historically, compounds isolated from castoreum were used in strawberry and raspberry flavorings and vanilla substitutes, but at present, the annual industry consumption is very low, around 100 kilograms (220 lb), whereas vanillin is over 1.2 million kg (2.6 million lb) annually.

Castoreum has been traditionally used in Sweden for flavoring a variety of snaps commonly referred to as Bäverhojt (lit. 'beaver shout').

=== Other ===
Castoreum was also considered as an ingredient for the flavor and odor of cigarettes.

Medieval beekeepers used castoreum to increase honey production.

== Related animal products ==
- Taxea, a secretion of the badger's subcaudal glands comparable in its medicinal use to the better-known castoreum
- Hyraceum, the petrified and rock-like excrement composed of urine and feces excreted by the Cape hyrax (Procavia capensis), and a sought-after material that has been used in traditional South African medicine and perfumery

== See also ==
- Musk
- Ambergris
- Perfume - Animal sources
- Violet gland
