= Cyclohexane-1,2-diol dehydrogenase =

cyclohexane-1,2-diol dehydrogenase

Identifiers
- EC no.: 1.1.1.174
- CAS no.: 62628-27-7

Databases
- IntEnz: IntEnz view
- BRENDA: BRENDA entry
- ExPASy: NiceZyme view
- KEGG: KEGG entry
- MetaCyc: metabolic pathway
- PRIAM: profile
- PDB structures: RCSB PDB PDBe PDBsum
- Gene Ontology: AmiGO / QuickGO
Search
- PMC: articles
- PubMed: articles
- NCBI: proteins

In enzymology, cyclohexane-1,2-diol dehydrogenase (EC 1.1.1.174) is an enzyme that catalyzes the chemical reaction

trans-cyclohexane-1,2-diol
+ NAD^{+}
H^{+}
H^{+}
2-hydroxycyclohexan-1-one
+ NADH

The two substrates of this enzyme are trans-cyclohexane-1,2-diol and oxidised nicotinamide adenine dinucleotide (NAD^{+}). Its products are 2-hydroxycyclohexan-1-one, reduced NADH, and a proton.

This enzyme belongs to the family of oxidoreductases, specifically those acting on the CH-OH group of donor with NAD^{+} or NADP^{+} as acceptor. The systematic name of this enzyme class is trans-cyclohexane-1,2-diol:NAD^{+} 1-oxidoreductase. This enzyme participates in caprolactam degradation.
