= Procinolol =

Names
- IUPAC name 1-(2-Cyclopropylphenoxy)-3-(propan-2-ylamino)propan-2-ol

Identifiers
CAS Number	27325-36-6
ChemSpider	64757
PubChem CID	71707
UNII	SLJ0HIL21J
CompTox Dashboard (EPA)	DTXSID90865362
- InChI: InChI=1S/C15H23NO2/c1-11(2)16-9-13(17)10-18-15-6-4-3-5-14(15)12-7-8-12/h3-6,11-13,16-17H,7-10H2,1-2H3 Key: RTAGQMIEWAAKMO-UHFFFAOYSA-N; InChI=1/C15H23NO2/c1-11(2)16-9-13(17)10-18-15-6-4-3-5-14(15)12-7-8-12/h3-6,11-13,16-17H,7-10H2,1-2H3 Key: RTAGQMIEWAAKMO-UHFFFAOYAR

Properties
Chemical formula	C_{15}H_{23}NO_{2}
Molar mass	249.354 g·mol^{−1}
- Except where otherwise noted, data are given for materials in their standard state (at 25 °C [77 °F], 100 kPa). Infobox references

Procinolol is a beta adrenergic receptor antagonist, a group of pharmaceutical drugs that lower heart rate and blood pressure.

It is not known to be marketed anywhere in the world in 2021.
