= Hyraceum =

Petrified excrement of the hyrax

Hyraceum Africa Stone
- Fossilized organic material rock
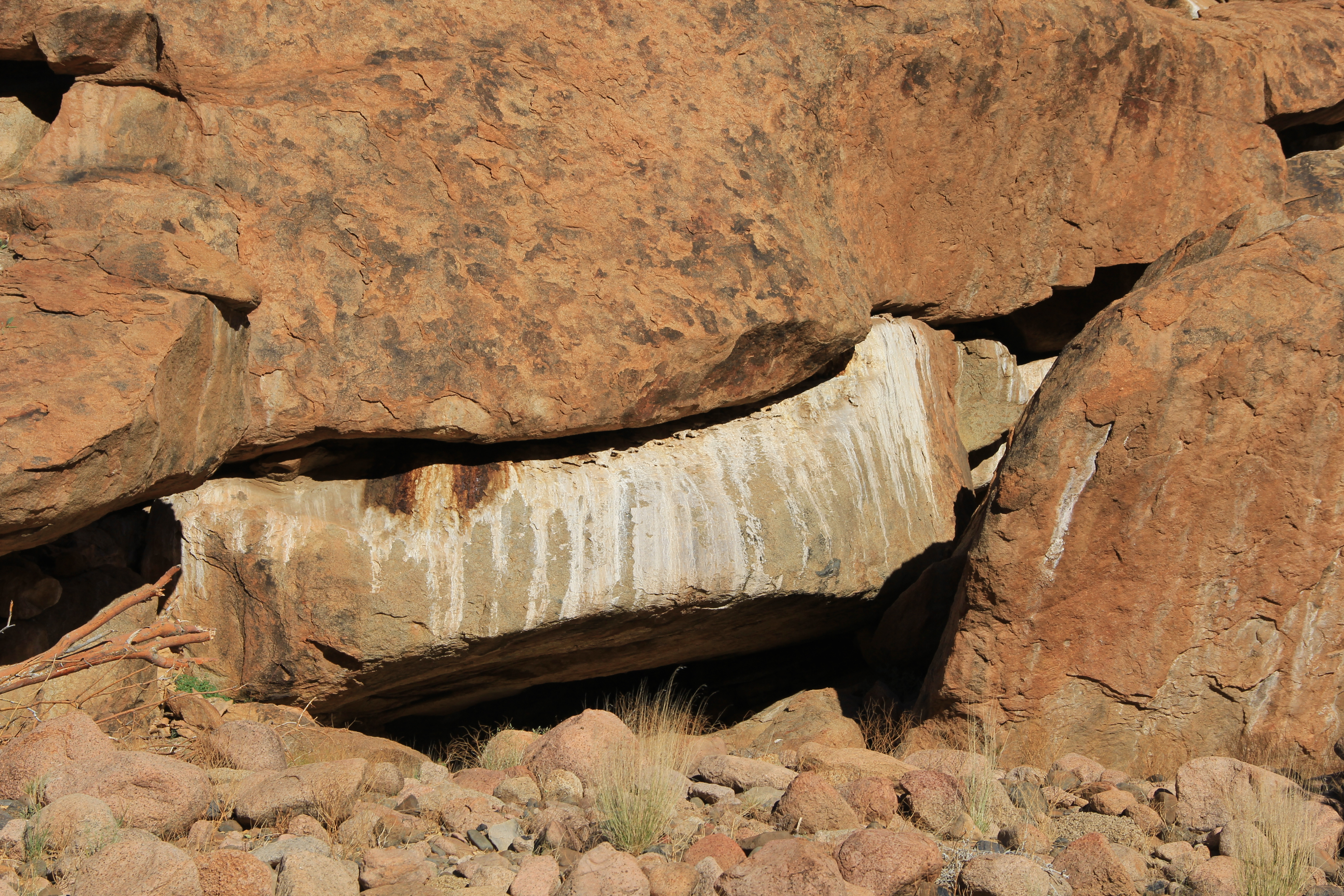
- Rock hyrax midden with hyraceum in the Tsisab gorge, Brandberg, Namibia

Composition
- Petrified excrement (urine and feces) of the rock hyrax (Procavia capensis)
- Texture: Hard, rock-like

Relationships
- Protoliths: Organic material

Hyraceum (/haɪˈreɪsiəm/) is the petrified and rock-like excrement composed of both urine and feces of the rock hyrax (Procavia capensis) and closely related species.

The rock hyrax defecates in the same location over generations, which may be sheltered in caves. These locations form middens that are composed of hyraceum and hyrax pellets, which can be petrified and preserved for over 50,000 years. These middens form a record of past climate and vegetation.

It is also a sought-after material that has been used in both traditional South African medicine and perfumery.

== Hyraceum in perfumery ==
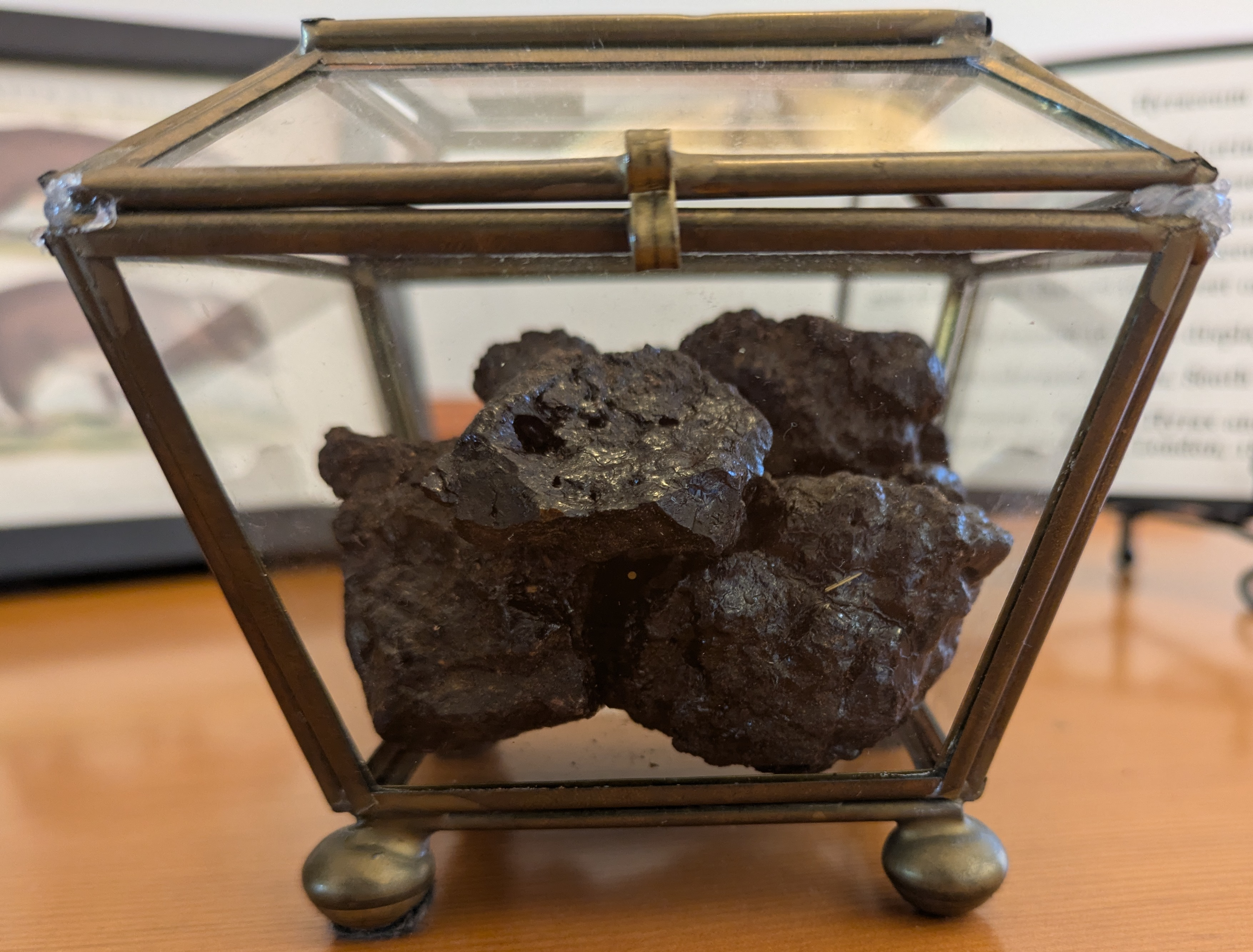
Hyraceum on display at a museum of perfumery

The material hardens and ages until it becomes a fairly sterile, rock-like material (also referred to as "Africa Stone") that contains compounds giving it an animalic, deeply complex fermented scent that combines the elements of musk, castoreum, civet, tobacco and agarwood. The material is harvested without disturbing the animals by digging strata of the brittle, resinous, irregular, blackish-brown stone; because animals are not harmed in its harvesting, it is often an ethical substitute for deer musk and civet, which require killing or inflicting pain on the animal.

Hyraceum accumulates extremely slowly, making it essentially a non-renewable resource. Considering that hyraceum – accumulating in the form of rock hyrax middens – is in many cases the only available source for information regarding climate and environmental change in arid regions of Africa and Arabia, its collection for commercial sale has been criticized in scientific circles as the destruction of a critical resource that could help to understand the impact of climate change in sensitive regions.

== Hyraceum in traditional South African medicine ==
Fossilized hyraceum has been used as a traditional folk medicine in South Africa for treating epilepsy. A study of 14 samples of the material collected at various geographical locations in South Africa tested the material for its affinity for the GABA-benzodiazepine receptor, a neurologic receptor site that is effective in the treatment of seizures with benzodiazapines such as diazepam and lorazepam. Four of the hyraceum samples assayed positive for having an affinity for the receptor sites; however, extracts in water were inactive.

== See also ==
- Tinnunculite
- Pack Rat
