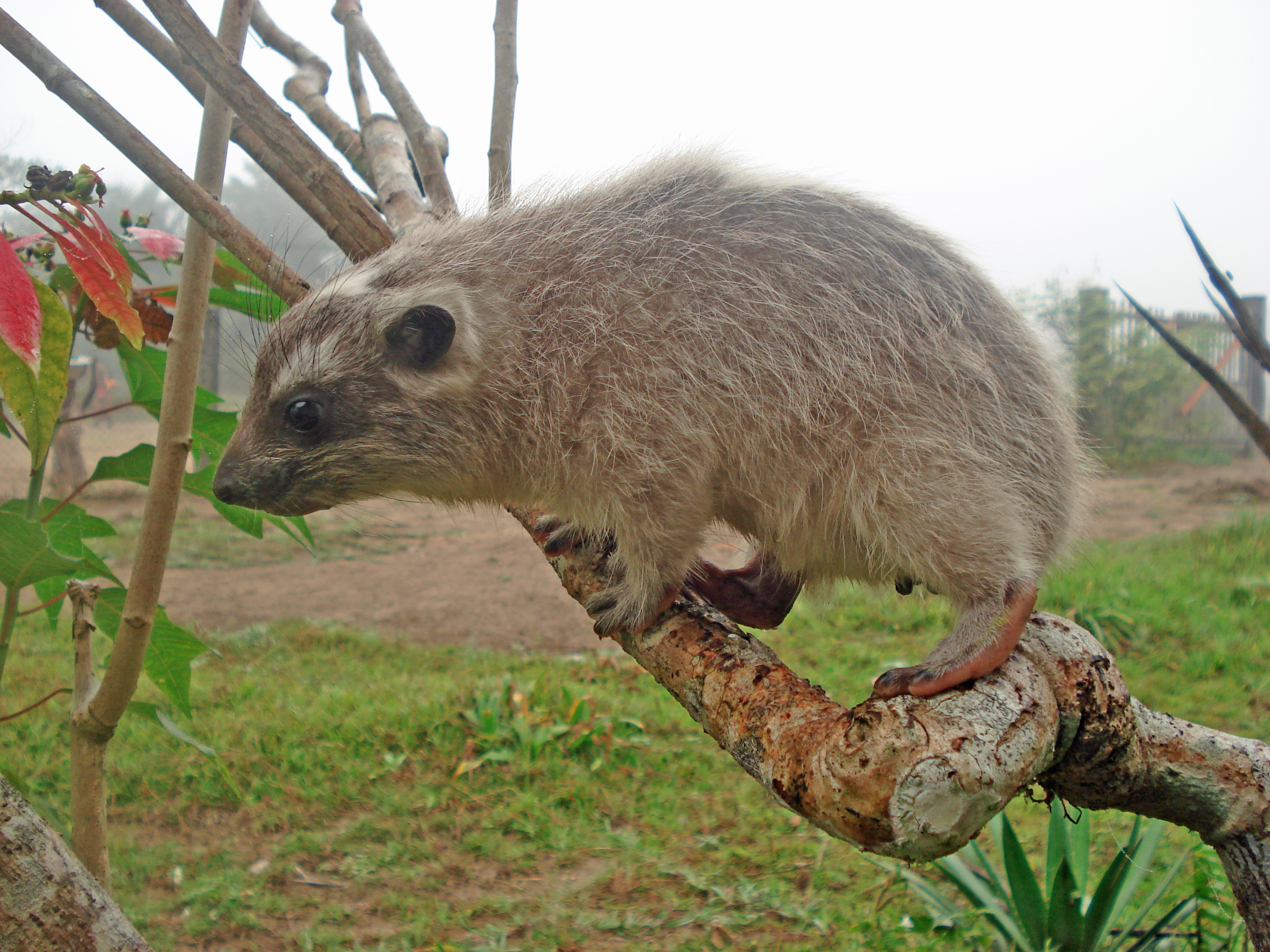

Conservation status
- Least Concern (IUCN 3.1)

Scientific classification
- Kingdom: Animalia
- Phylum: Chordata
- Class: Mammalia
- Infraclass: Placentalia
- Order: Hyracoidea
- Family: Procaviidae
- Genus: Dendrohyrax
- Species: D. dorsalis

Binomial name
- Dendrohyrax dorsalis (Fraser, 1853)
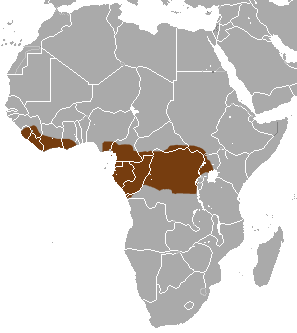
- Western tree hyrax range

= Western tree hyrax =

Species of mammal

The western tree hyrax (Dendrohyrax dorsalis), also called the western tree dassie or Beecroft's tree hyrax, is a species of tree hyrax within the family Procaviidae. It can be distinguished from other hyraxes by short coarse fur, presence of white patch of fur beneath the chin, lack of hair on the rostrum, and lower crowns of the cheek teeth compared to other members of the same genus.

== Description ==
The western tree hyrax is similar in appearance to a large guinea pig. It has a head-and-body length of between 440 and 570 mm (17.3 and 22.4 in) and a stumpy tail. The pelage is thick and coarse, with a few yellowish hairs scattered among the dark brown and blackish ones; pale individuals with cream-coloured coats have also been observed. Scattered long sensory hairs similar to whiskers are present in the coat. The snout is free from fur, the ears are small and rounded and sometimes tipped with white, and the chin bears a white spot. There is a dorsal scent gland up to 70 mm (2.8 in) long in the centre of the back, surrounded by a yellowish patch of fur.

== Behavior ==
Western tree hyraxes tend to be solitary, and only occasionally are found in groups of two or three. They are nocturnal and generally feed at night. It has been noted that this species is an especially adept climber. In captivity they have been observed to climb up the edge of an open door with ease, as well as being able to quickly scale smooth tree trunks. They are aided in climbing with their black, pliant footpads with numerous ridges. Captive animals were observed using their teeth to help hold on to wires and vines while climbing.

The gestation period is about eight months with a litter size one or two young.

== Ecology ==
Common predators of the western tree hyrax are hawks, leopards, servals, eagles, pythons, and African golden cats, in addition to occasionally being hunted by humans for food. In Bossou, Guinea, one notable ecological association with chimpanzees occurs. A chimpanzee at Bossou was observed capturing a western tree hyrax, carrying it to her nest, and sleeping with and grooming it. This suggests that chimpanzees in Bossou may not regard hyraxes as a prey animal.

== Range and habitat ==
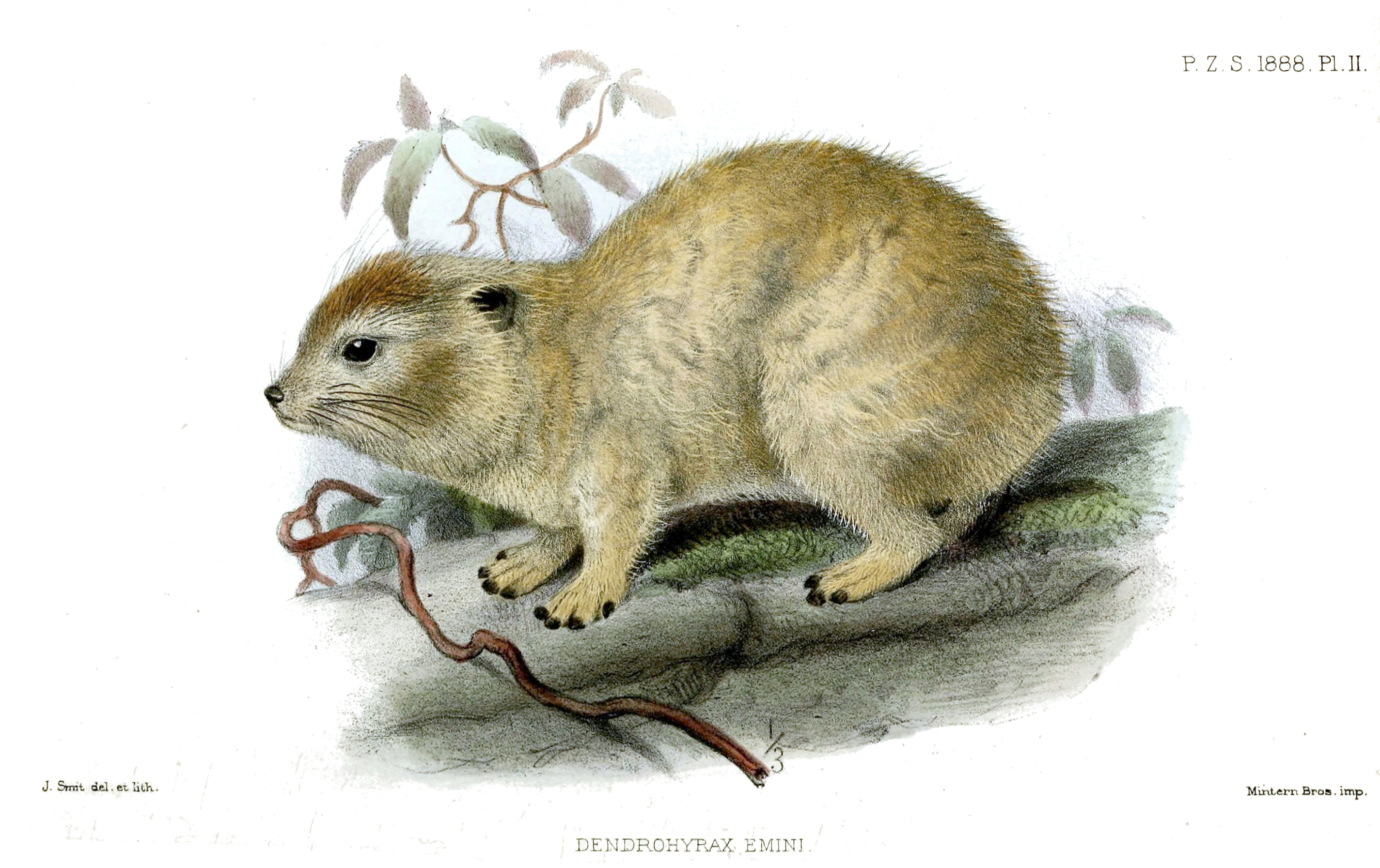
D. d. emini

The western tree hyrax is found in West and Central Africa: Benin, Cameroon, Central African Republic, Republic of the Congo, Democratic Republic of the Congo, Ivory Coast, Equatorial Guinea, Gabon, Gambia, Ghana, Guinea, Guinea-Bissau, Liberia, Nigeria, Rwanda, Senegal, Sierra Leone, South Sudan, Togo, Uganda, and possibly Niger. Its natural habitats are subtropical or tropical moist lowland forests, moist savanna, and rocky areas.
