= Castoramine =

Names
- Preferred IUPAC name [(3S,6S,9R,9aS)-6-(Furan-3-yl)-9-methyloctahydro-2H-quinolizin-3-yl]methanol
- Other names (−)-Castoramine

Identifiers
CAS Number	6874-86-8
3D model (JSmol)	Interactive image
ChemSpider	9543597
PubChem CID	11368680
CompTox Dashboard (EPA)	DTXSID201045469
- InChI: InChI=1S/C15H23NO2/c1-11-2-4-15(13-6-7-18-10-13)16-8-12(9-17)3-5-14(11)16/h6-7,10-12,14-15,17H,2-5,8-9H2,1H3/t11-,12+,14+,15+/m1/s1 Key: FFVCMXOAPCVMHQ-DHMWGJHJSA-N; InChI=1/C15H23NO2/c1-11-2-4-15(13-6-7-18-10-13)16-8-12(9-17)3-5-14(11)16/h6-7,10-12,14-15,17H,2-5,8-9H2,1H3/t11-,12+,14+,15+/m1/s1 Key: FFVCMXOAPCVMHQ-DHMWGJHJBE
- SMILES: OC[C@@H]3CN2[C@H](c1ccoc1)CC[C@@H](C)[C@@H]2CC3

Properties
Chemical formula	C_{15}H_{23}NO_{2}
Molar mass	249.354 g·mol^{−1}
- Except where otherwise noted, data are given for materials in their standard state (at 25 °C [77 °F], 100 kPa). Infobox references

Castoramine is an alkaloid with the molecular formula C_{15}H_{23}NO_{2}.

== Natural occurrence ==
It is a chemical constituent of castoreum.
