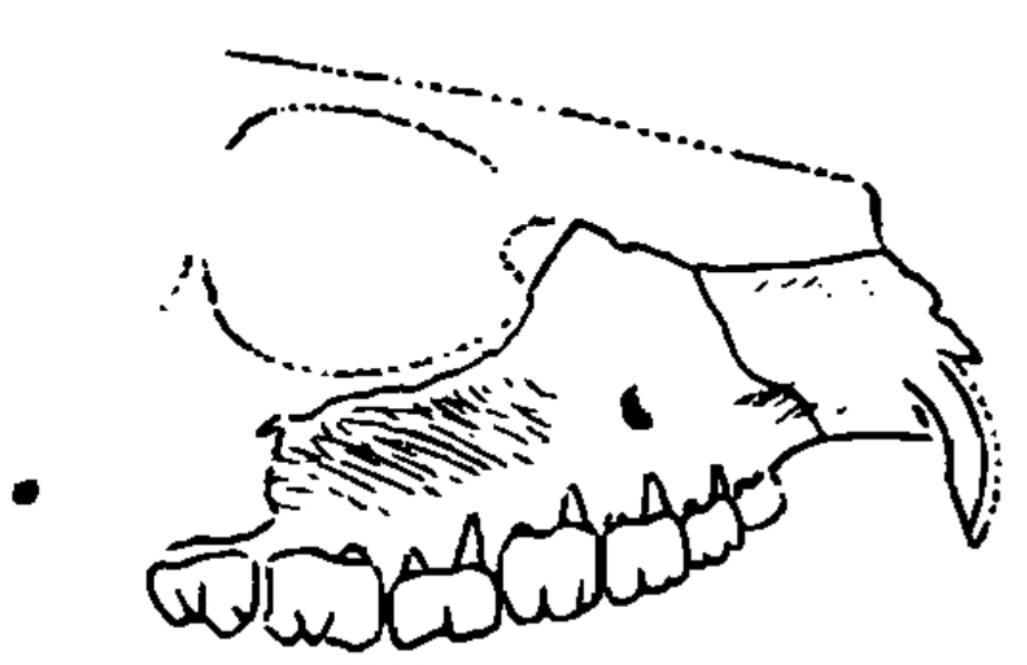
- Illustration of a skull fragment of Procavia antiqua

Scientific classification
- Kingdom: Animalia
- Phylum: Chordata
- Class: Mammalia
- Order: Hyracoidea
- Family: Procaviidae
- Genus: Procavia
- Species: †P. antiqua

Binomial name
- †Procavia antiqua Broom, 1934

Synonyms
- Procavia robertsi Broom and Schepers, 1946

= Procavia antiqua =

Procavia antiqua Temporal range: Late Pliocene-Early Pleistocene, 3.03–0.96 Ma

Extinct species of hyrax

Procavia antiqua is an extinct species of hyrax that lived in South Africa during the Late Pliocene and Early Pleistocene epochs, about 3.03 million–960,000 years ago. Its fossilized remains were first discovered in Taung, and have since been found in many more caves within the country. The species was named in 1934 by Robert Broom, who recognized that it belonged in the genus Procavia, of which the only species existing today is the rock hyrax (P. capensis). Fossils of P. antiqua are very similar to the bones of the rock hyrax, differing mainly in characteristics of the teeth. Because of this, it has been proposed that P. antiqua is an ancestor of the rock hyrax or even the same species as it. If the latter case is true, this would make P. antiqua a junior synonym of P. capensis, though there remains disagreement between researchers over whether this is the case.

Being around the size of a rock hyrax, P. antiqua is one of the smaller species of its genus, and lived alongside the larger fossil species Procavia transvaalensis. The two likely avoiding direct competition by employing different feeding strategies, with the higher tooth crowns indicating that P. transvaalensis was more of a grazer, while P. antiqua was more generalist and also fed by browsing. It is believed that male P. antiqua grew larger than the females based on the width of their humeri, and the morphology of the upper incisor teeth also differed between the sexes, with those of the males having a more concave front face and a deeper ridge. A very large number of fossil specimens have been attributed to P. antiqua, many of which are skull elements, and they show a range of morphological variation, leading some experts to suggest that either more than one species is represented in this sample or that P. antiqua was more variable than modern hyraxes.

The caves which have yielded P. antiqua fossils are within a UNESCO World heritage site known as the Cradle of Humankind, so named because many specimens of early hominins have been discovered there. In at least some of these caves, the hyrax remains may have been brought in from the surrounding environment by predators such as large eagles. Analysis of the fossil content in these caves suggests that the natural environment of P. antiqua contained a forest–savanna mosaic of habitats, with the geologically older localities bearing more woodland while the younger sites would have been more dominated by grassland as the environment became drier. Large outcrops of rock were present in this environment as well, and were likely the preferred habitat of this hyrax.

== Taxonomic history ==
In 1934, South African paleontologist Robert Broom published a study in which he reports that a large number of fossilized small animal bones have been discovered in the breccia deposits in Taung, South Africa. These remains were associated with the Taung Child specimen of Australopithecus africanus, which was discovered 10 years prior. Among these specimens were the many broken skulls of a type of hyrax, and Broom determined that they represent an extinct species that was not previously known to science. He named this species Procavia antiqua, with the specific name meaning "ancient" in Latin. Though Broom analysed many skulls of this species, he did not designate any of them as the holotype. Broom later coauthored a book with Gerrit Willem Hendrik Schepers, which was published in 1946 and mentions that another South African fossil species of hyrax had been discovered, this one being given the name Procavia robertsi. The species was described in greater detail in a 1948 publication by Broom, which presents a well-preserved skull of P. robertsi excavated from the Sterkfontein cave.

The aforementioned hyrax fossils studied by Broom were reanalysed by British paleontologist Charles Stephen Churcher in 1956, who discovered that the remains assigned to P. antiqua did not differ significantly in size or anatomical characteristics from those assigned to P. robertsi. It was therefore determined that these specimens represented only a single species, and since P. antiqua was named first, this name was retained and P. robertsi was declared as a junior synonym of it. In addition, Churcher stated that the original P. antiqua specimens analyzed by Broom had been lost, though three new fragments had been found at the locality where they were discovered.

The validity of P. antiqua was brought into question in 1994 by Clive R. McMahon and Francis Thackeray, who conducted statistical analyses of both fossilized hyrax specimens and bones of extant hyrax species. They found that P. antiqua was not significantly different from the modern rock hyrax (P. capensis), and thus should be considered a junior synonym of P. capensis. However, the original specimens of P. antiqua studied by Broom in 1934 were not used in the analyses because they were thought to be lost at the time, so a fossil formerly assigned to P. robertsi was used instead. The following year, over 70 of Broom's original P. antiqua specimens were rediscovered in the Albany Museum in Makhanda, South Africa, and since Broom had not designated any of them as a holotype, a palatal specimen (given the specimen number 4194A in the museum's collection) was designated as the lectotype of P. antiqua. In 1997, Broom's fossils were studied for the first time since their original description, when Gary T. Schwartz compared them to the bones of rock hyraxes to determine whether P. antiqua truly is synonymous with this modern species. He concluded that the teeth of the two do indeed differ significantly enough that they should be considered separate species, and thus P. antiqua was declared a valid species again. Even so, the validity of the species would be doubted again, when Kenyan paleontologist Martin Pickford stated in 2005 that the known sample of P. antiqua specimens showed a wide range of variation in tooth morphology comparable to that in rock hyraxes. Pickford mentioned that he considered the P. antiqua fossils to be better classified as remains of rock hyraxes, but refrained from officially declaring the species invalid, stating that more detailed analyses including undescribed specimens is required to determine the validity of P. antiqua.

=== Reclassified specimens ===
South African paleontologist Quinton Brett Hendey published two studies in 1976 and 1981 respectively, in which he reports that hyrax fossils had been discovered in Langebaanweg, Western Cape. He considered these specimens to be comparable to those of Procavia antiqua, and therefore reported them under the designation Procavia cf. antiqua, but did not describe them in detail. These remains were later studied by Kenyan paleontologist Martin Pickford, who determined that they differ from P. antiqua and should be assigned to a separate species. In 2005, he named this species Procavia pliocenica, referencing the Pliocene age of this hyrax.

== Description ==
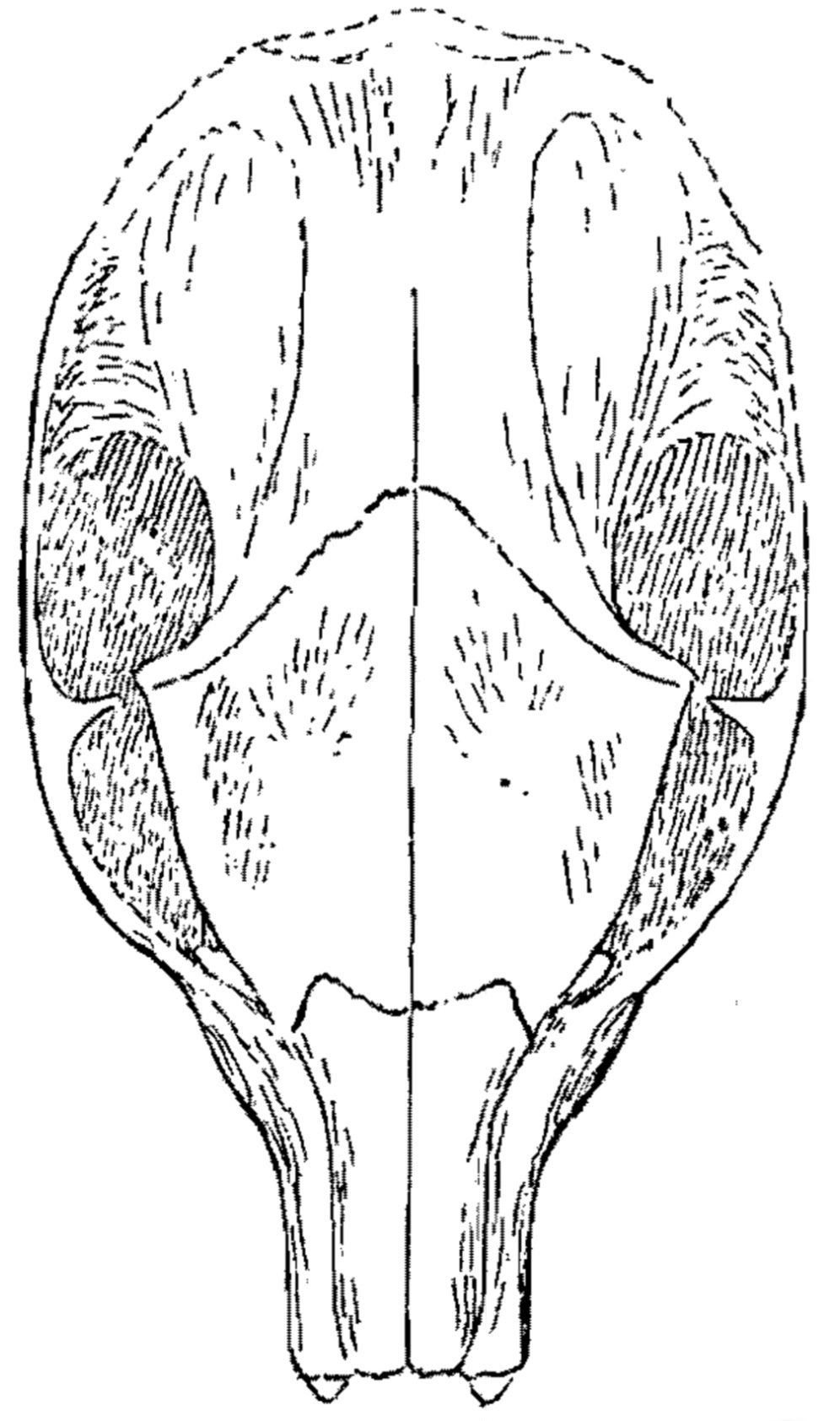
Illustration of a Procavia antiqua skull seen from above

Procavia antiqua is one of the smaller species of its genus, being comparable in size to the modern rock hyrax and smaller than the fossil species Procavia transvaalensis. One measured skull of P. antiqua (the one designated as the holotype of its junior synonym P. robertsi) has a length of 82.5 mm (3.25 in) and a width of 48 mm (1.9 in) at the jugals, giving it a length to width ratio of 1.719:1. This makes it slightly lighter built than that of the rock hyrax (in which one skull had a length to width ratio of 1.698:1), though the skull proportions are similar between the two species, and both have a short muzzle. The interparietal bones are normally free and unfused, though specimens where they are fused have been reported, and the parietal bones range from flat to slightly convex. The infraorbital foramen (a small whole in the upper jaw bone) is located above the third premolar, and the postorbital bar (a bony arch behind the eye) is open, being divided by a small gap in the middle.

While the majority of known P. antiqua fossils are made up of skull elements, postcranial remains have also been reported. In 1956, the only known postcranial element was an axis bone (the second vertebra in the neck), though a portion of this bone embedded in the surrounding matrix and could not be observed. The spinal canal could be seen on the left side of this axis and is thinner and more oblong than that of a rock hyrax, with a lighter surrounding bony arch. The left posterior zygapophysis (a projection that would have fit with another vertebra) and the front facet joints of this axis were also lighter than those of a rock hyrax, but otherwise very similar in structure. Additional postcranial remains have been found since then. Humeri specimens have been reported from Member 3 of the Swartkrans cave deposits, and measurements have been taken of their widths. There is a statistically significant difference between the width of these P. antiqua humeri and the fossilized humeri of rock hyraxes from same deposits, with the former being larger, though this may be due to subadult rock hyraxes being present in the sample or size variation within the species.

=== Dentition ===
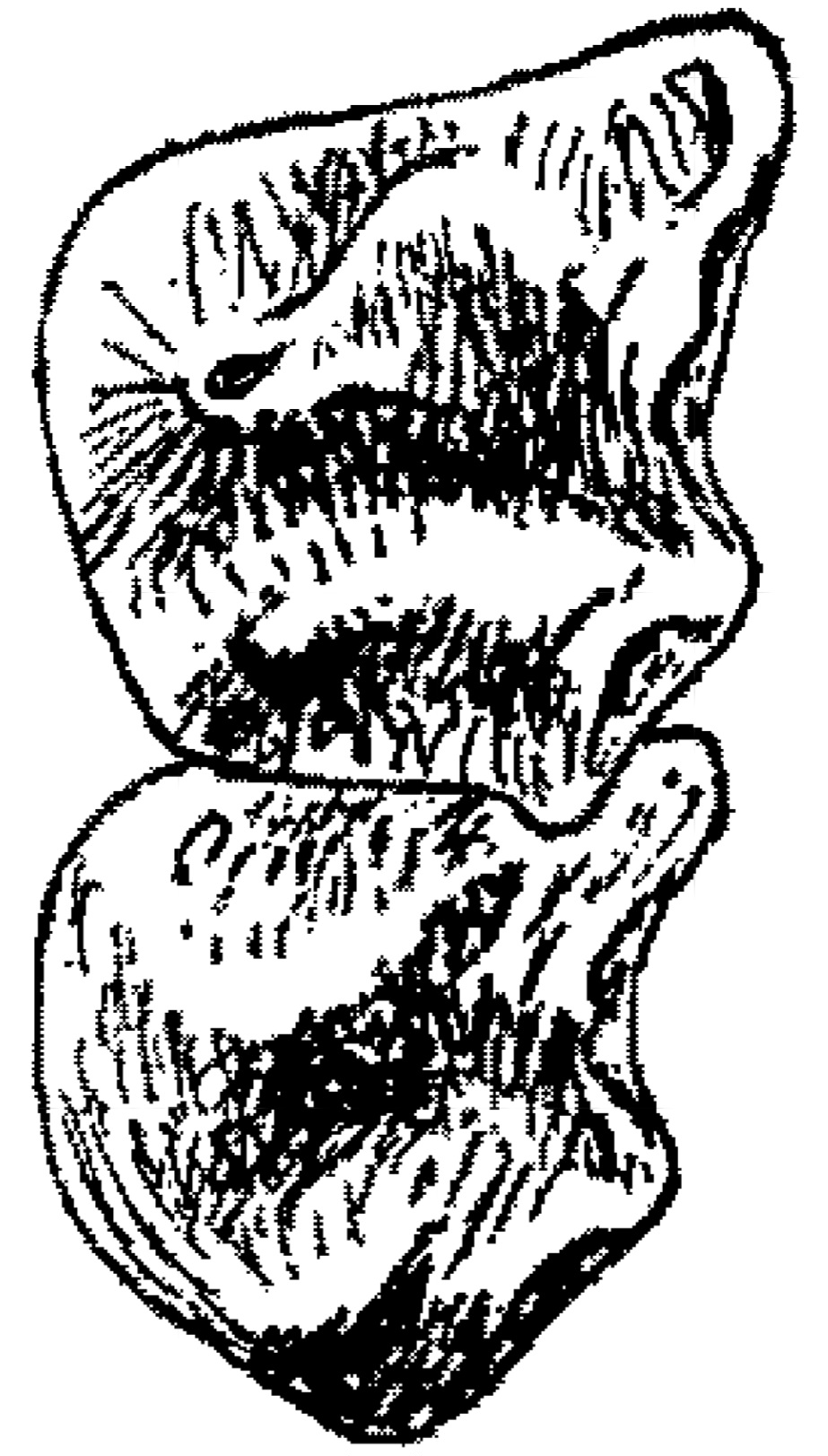
Illustration of the left second and third upper molars of Procavia antiqua

Members of the Procavia genus have a dental formula of 1.0.4.32.0.4.3 for a total of 34 teeth, dental arches which converge at the front of the jaw, first incisor teeth located close together and lower incisors of about equal size, and these features are seen in P. antiqua. Compared to the rock hyrax, the ectolophs (ridges on the molar teeth) of this fossil species are shorter and the third molar possesses a distinct hypocone, which are features distinguishing it as a separate species. In addition, the maxillary molar teeth are generally more brachyodont (the tooth crowns are lower) than those of the rock hyrax, but still more hypsodont (higher tooth crowns) than those of the tree hyraxes in the genus Dendrohyrax. However, the known sample of P. antiqua remains shows a wide range in tooth morphology, with the teeth of some individuals being more hypsodont and those of others being more brachyodont. This has been suggested to be a sign that multiple hyrax species are represented in this large sample of fossils, or that this species exhibited a different variantion range from modern hyraxes. Though no specimens of P. antiqua have been found with milk teeth preserved, the order of tooth replacement can be inferred from the amount of wear on each tooth, which indicates the first molar (M1) was lost first, followed by the first (P1), second (P2), third (P3) and fourth (P4) premolars, and finally the second (M2) and third (M3) molars, which is the exact same tooth replacement order as that of the modern rock hyrax. Canine teeth are not known in any P. antiqua fossils, so if milk canines were present, they would have been lost and not replaced.

As with the rock hyrax, the upper incisors of P. antiqua are separated by a small diastema (gap) narrower than one incisor, and the diastema between the incisors and premolars is about equal to or slightly less than the distance of the second to third premolars. The upper incisors each bear a ridge, which is deeper in some individuals than others. Those with deep ridges also have incisors with a more concave outer face, and this morph has been interpreted as the male, while those with shallower ridges and rounder incisor faces are suggested to be female. The lower incisors are naturally trifid (bearing three protruding points), but in some individuals the points have been worn away. The lower cheek molars bear cingula (U-shaped ridges) on the outer front edge of the hypoconulid and protoconulid (small cusps on the teeth), which may vary from being barely noticeable to so developed that they form distinct ridges depending on the individual.

== Classification and evolution ==
Since its remains were first discovered, Procavia antiqua has been recognized as a member of the genus Procavia, of which the only extant species is the rock hyrax (P. capensis). In his initial description of the species, Robert Broom assigned it to a subgenus named Prohyrax, classifying it as Procavia (Prohyrax) antiqua. However, Charles Stephen Churcher pointed out in 1956 that this subgenus is invalid because the name Prohyrax is preoccupied by a separate hyrax genus, and since P. antiqua is so similar to the modern rock hyrax, no new subgenus was established for it as that would only make the nomenclature more complicate.

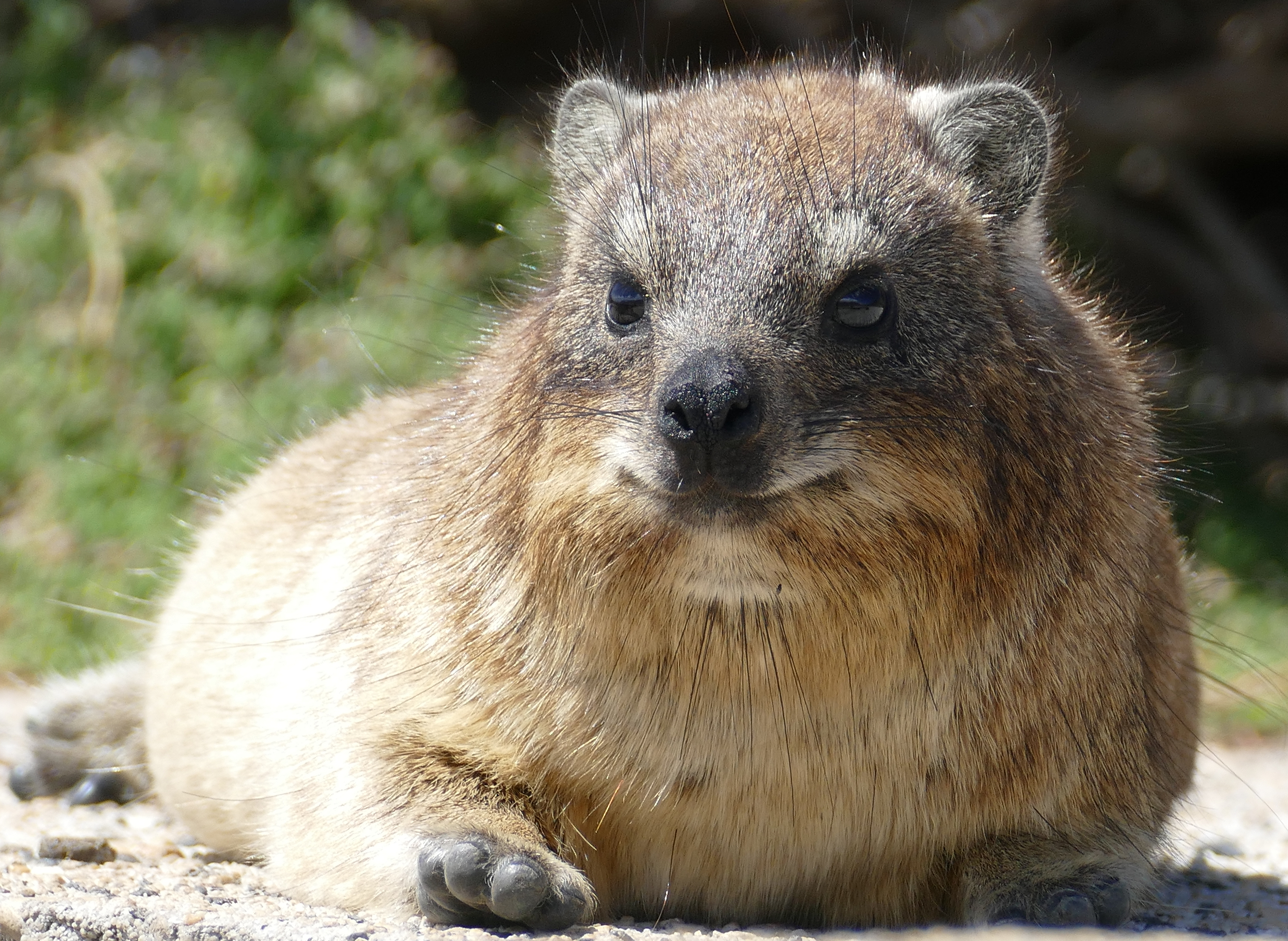
The modern rock hyrax has been proposed to be a descendant of Procavia antiqua

Because its fossils bear so much resemblance to the bones of the rock hyrax, P. antiqua has long been suggested to be an ancestor of the modern species, an idea first proposed by Broom in 1934. This hypothesis was also supported in Churcher's 1956 publication, in which the writer further added that while P. antiqua probably gave rise to the rock hyrax, it is unlikely to be an ancestor of the tree hyraxes in the Dendrohyrax genus. The rock hyrax is differentiated from P. antiqua primarily by characteristics of the teeth, and these differences have been proposed to be the result of an evolutionary change in feeding habits, with P. antiqua being largely a browser and gradually evolving to become more of a grazer as it developed into the modern rock hyrax. However, there is a range of variation in the teeth of different P. antiqua specimens, which may suggest the many specimens assigned to this species actually represent more than one species, or that this prehistoric species had a different range of variation from modern hyraxes.

== Paleobiology ==
=== Feeding ===
Like all modern hyrax species, Procavia antiqua would have been a herbivore. The morphology of the molar teeth can be used to determine the feeding habits of an animal; G.T. Schwartz stated in 1997 that the molars of P. antiqua have lower tooth crowns than those of the modern rock hyrax, which suggests that the former species was more reliant on browsing as a feeding method, similar to modern hyraxes of the genera Dendrohyrax and Heterohyrax, whereas rock hyraxes also graze on grass. Procavia transvaalensis is another fossil species of hyrax known to occur in the same deposits as P. antiqua, and its teeth have high tooth crowns indicative of a reliance on grazing. Schwartz therefore proposed that these two species were able to coexist by niche partitioning and avoid direct competition with each other. In 2005, Martin Pickford noted that the many known P. antiqua skulls show tooth crowns of various heights, indicating that while some individuals ate only small amounts of grass, others would have consumed much more of it. He was therefore skeptical that all these specimens represented a single distinct species, suggesting they may actually represent multiple species or possibly be the same species as the modern rock hyrax, but did not confidently declare P. antiqua invalid pending further research.

=== Predation ===
The idea that assemblages comprising many P. antiqua fossils represent individuals which fell prey to other animals has been proposed since the species was first found. The first set of remains of this species to be found were a large number of broken skulls in the cave deposits in Taung, found in association with a juvenile skull of the hominin Australopithecus africanus commonly referred to as the Taung Child. Robert Broom therefore believed that these hyraxes were eaten by this hominin species, which supposedly killed the hyraxes by tossing stones at them and broke the skulls in the feeding process. Later in 1995, it was noted that the fossil assemblage at Taung resembled prey remains left by large raptors, and a 2006 study of the Taung Child's skull suggested that this individual may have been killed by a large eagle. This led to the development of a new theory that the fossils at Taung were the accumulated kills of a bird of prey, and that the hominin itself was a prey item rather than a predator of the other represented species such as the hyraxes. This theory was further investigated in 2010, when a study found that the evidence for eagles being the accumulators of fossils in most South African cave deposits was uncompelling, though their involvement remains possible in Member 1 of Swartkrans, Unit A of the Kromdraai fossil site, Member 4 of Sterkfontein and Member 3 of Makapansgat, and P. antiqua fossils are among the specimens potentially accumulated by eagles.

=== Sexual dimorphism ===
Analysis by Charles Stephen Churcher published in 1956 has found that skulls of P. antiqua exhibit two different forms of upper incisor teeth. In some specimens, there is a very prominent ridge on these incisors, and the front faces of these teeth are concave. In others, this ridge is much less distinct, and the front faces of the incisors are more rounded. Churcher believed that these differences were due to sexual dimorphism, with the former incisor morphology being that of the male and the latter being that of the female. Based on this, it was determine in a 1994 study that male P. antiqua outnumber females in the fossil assemblage at Swartkrans, with 32 males and 18 females being sampled from across members 1 to 3 of that cave. Aside from the incisors, sexual dimorphism is also observed in the breadth of the humerus, with the males having wider humeri than the females, reflecting the larger size of the males. Using this characteristic, a different study published in 2022 found that more adult female P. antiqua were represented in the Swartkrans deposits than adult males instead, though subadult specimens did not show a clear dominant sex being represented. Though this seems to contradict the results of the earlier study, the authors of the 2022 study suggest this may be due to the larger available sample of incisors than humeri, and that incisors are easily separated from the rest of the animal after death. Because females tend to outnumber males in modern rock hyrax colonies, it appears likely that this was also the case for P. antiqua.

== Paleoenvironment ==
Fossils of Procavia antiqua were first discovered in the cave deposits of Taung, and have since been reported from many other caves in South Africa, including the Kromdraai fossil site, Makapansgat, Bolt's Farm, Cooper's Cave, Sterkfontein, Gladysvale Cave and members 1 to 3 of Swartkrans. These deposits were not all formed at the same time; among the oldest of these are Makapansgat (which was formed between 3 and 2.6 million years ago) and the Aves Complex of Bolt's Farm (which dates back 3.03 to 2.61 million years based on paleomagnetism and U-Pb data), whereas Member 3 of Swartkrans is one of the youngest (with cosmogenic nuclides suggesting it was deposited about 960,000 years ago), and together they indicate that P. antiqua existed from about 3.03 million to 960,000 years ago, spanning the Late Pliocene and Early Pleistocene epochs. These caves are situated within the UNESCO World heritage site of the Cradle of Humankind, so called because the caves in this area have yielded many fossils of early hominins.

Analysis of the fossil assemblages in these caves suggests that the general environment in the Cradle was largely similar to the present day environment in this part of Africa, though exact conditions vary between different localities and time periods. This evidence suggests that a mix of different habitats was present in the Cradle of Humankind, from open grassland to closed woodland, likely indicating a mosaic environment. The habitat composition changed over time, with a more wooded environment present around the transition of the Pliocene and Pleistocene epochs, which gradually shifted to becoming more dominated by grassland, likely indicating that the humidity decreased. Further evidence of the Cradle of Humankind becoming dryer over this period comes from the fossil content, with older deposits such as those at Kromdraai yielding remains of water-bound animals like Anas ducks and African clawless otters, indicating the presence of a large stream or river. However, specimens of water-associated birds become almost absent in younger deposits like those of Cooper's Cave, and grassland species become far more abundant. Large rocky outcrops were likely also present in the distribution of P. antiqua, as this is the preferred habitat of the modern rock hyrax which it closely resembles. Furthermore, many fossils of a species of bald ibis, Geronticus thackerayi, have been found at Kromdraai, including juvenile specimens. As bald ibises rely on rock outcrops for nesting, this is further evidence of such features being present in this locality.
