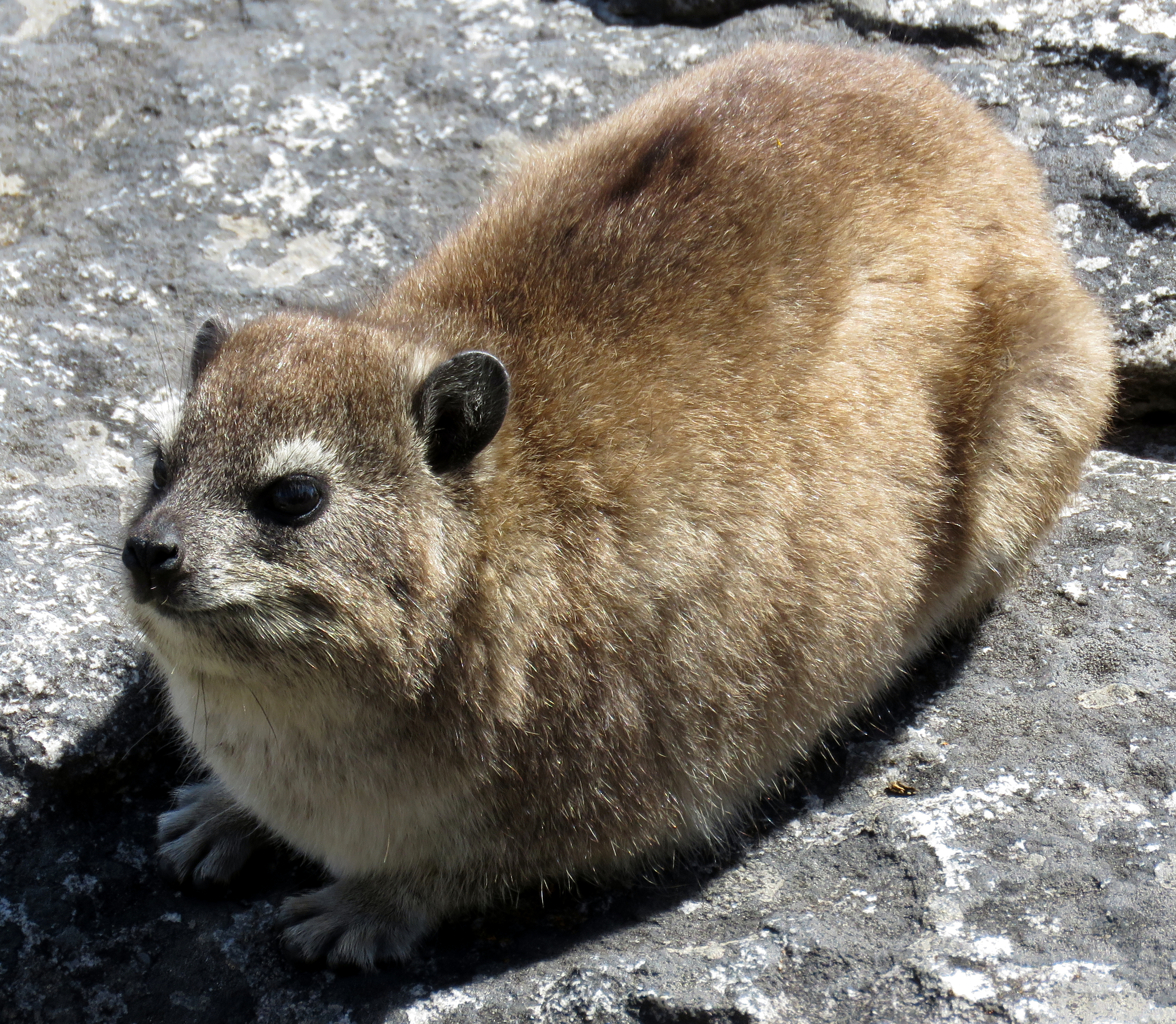
- Rock hyrax (Procavia capensis)

Scientific classification
- Kingdom: Animalia
- Phylum: Chordata
- Class: Mammalia
- Order: Hyracoidea
- Family: Procaviidae
- Genus: Procavia; Storr, 1780

Type species
- Cavia capensis Pallas, 1766

Species
- Procavia capensis; †Procavia antiqua; †Procavia pliocenica; †Procavia transvaalensis

= Procavia =

Procavia Temporal range: Pliocene - Recent

Genus of mammal

Procavia is a genus of hyraxes. The rock hyrax (P. capensis) is currently the only extant species belonging to this genus, though other species were recognized in the past, including P. habessinica and P. ruficeps, both now relegated to subspecific rank.

Several fossil species are known as well, the oldest dated to the Zanclean (early Pliocene), including:

- †Procavia antiqua (syn. Procavia robertsi)
- †Procavia pliocenica
- †Procavia transvaalensis (syn. Procavia obermeyerae)
