= Procavia transvaalensis =

Procavia transvaalensis Temporal range: Late Pliocene - Early Pleistocene

Scientific classification
- Kingdom: Animalia
- Phylum: Chordata
- Class: Mammalia
- Infraclass: Placentalia
- Order: Hyracoidea
- Family: Procaviidae
- Genus: Procavia
- Species: †P. transvaalensis

Binomial name
- †Procavia transvaalensis Shaw, 1937

Synonyms
- Procavia obermeyerae

Extinct species of hyrax

Procavia transvaalensis is an extinct species of hyrax from the Plio-Pleistocene of South Africa. Remains of this species have been found at multiple sites in the country, including the Swartkrans and Kromdraai.

== Description ==
In comparison to the extant rock hyrax, P. transvaalensis was about 50% larger in linear dimensions. It was considered specialized for steppe habitats and was less closely related to the modern rock hyrax than the other extinct species of the genus.
