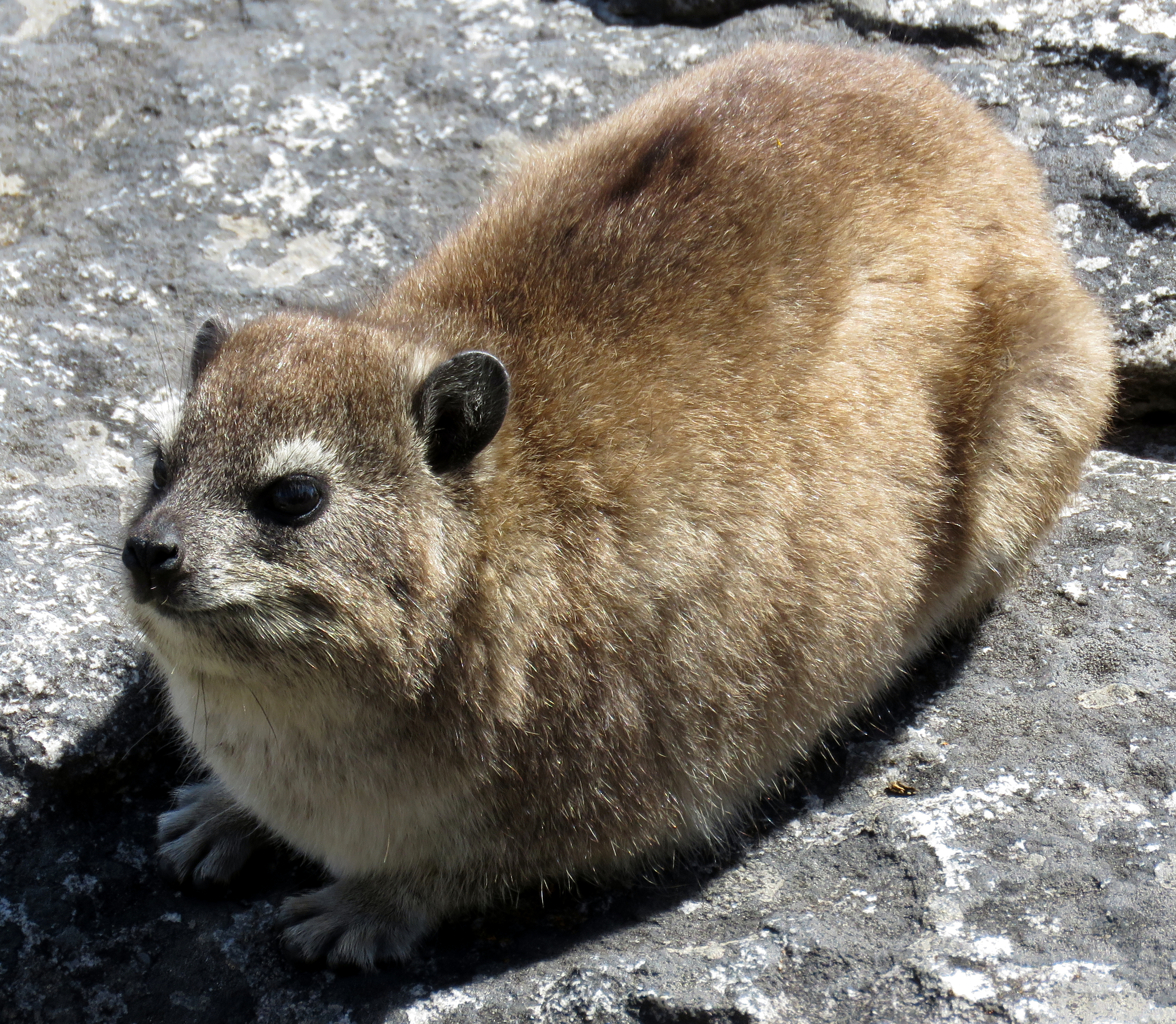
- Rock hyrax (Procavia capensis); Erongo, Namibia

Conservation status
- Least Concern (IUCN 3.1)

Scientific classification
- Kingdom: Animalia
- Phylum: Chordata
- Class: Mammalia
- Order: Hyracoidea
- Family: Procaviidae
- Genus: Procavia
- Species: P. capensis

Binomial name
- Procavia capensis (Pallas, 1766)

Subspecies
- See text
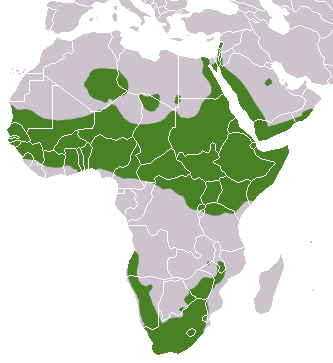
- range

= Rock hyrax =

Species of mammal native to Africa and the Middle East

The rock hyrax (/ˈhaɪ.ræks/; Procavia capensis), also called dassie, Rickaz, Cape hyrax, rock rabbit, or coney (in early English Bible translations), is a medium-sized terrestrial hyrax native to Africa and the Middle East. Commonly called the dassie in South Africa (/ˈdæsi/; Afrikaans: klipdassie), it is one of the five living species of the order Hyracoidea, and the only one in the genus Procavia. Rock hyraxes weigh 4–5 kg (8.8–11.0 lb) and have short ears.

Rock hyraxes are found at elevations up to 4,200 m (13,800 ft) above sea level in habitats with rock crevices, allowing them to escape from predators. They are the only extant terrestrial afrotherians in the Middle East. (Note: The marine dugong is also present in the area.) Hyraxes typically live in groups of 10–80 animals, and forage as a group. They have been reported to use sentries to warn of the approach of predators. Having incomplete thermoregulation, they are most active in the morning and evening, although their activity pattern varies substantially with season and climate.

Over most of its range, the rock hyrax is not endangered, and in some areas is considered a minor pest.

== Characteristics ==
Rock hyraxes are squat and heavily built, with adults reaching a length of 50 cm (20 in) and weighing around 4 kg (8.8 lb), with a slight sexual dimorphism, males being about 10% heavier than females. Their fur is thick and grey-brown, although this varies strongly between different environments, from dark brown in wetter habitats, to light gray in desert-living individuals. Hyrax size (as measured by skull length and humerus diameter) is correlated to precipitation, probably because of the effect on preferred hyrax forage.

Prominent in and apparently unique to hyraxes is the dorsal gland, which excretes an odour used for social communication and territorial marking. The gland is most clearly visible in dominant males.

The rock hyrax has a pointed head, short neck, and rounded ears. It has long, black whiskers on its muzzle. The rock hyrax has a prominent pair of long, pointed tusk-like upper incisors, which are reminiscent of the elephant, to which the hyrax is distantly related. The fore feet are plantigrade, and the hind feet are semi-digitigrade. The soles of the feet have large, soft pads that are kept moist with sweat-like secretions. In males, the testes are permanently abdominal, another anatomical feature that hyraxes share with elephants and sirenians.

Thermoregulation in rock hyraxes has been subject to much research, as their body temperature varies with a diurnal rhythm. Animals kept in constant environmental conditions also display such variation, and this internal mechanism may be related to water balance regulation. The hyraxes fur is also very thick and more of a golden color to absorb in more sunlight.

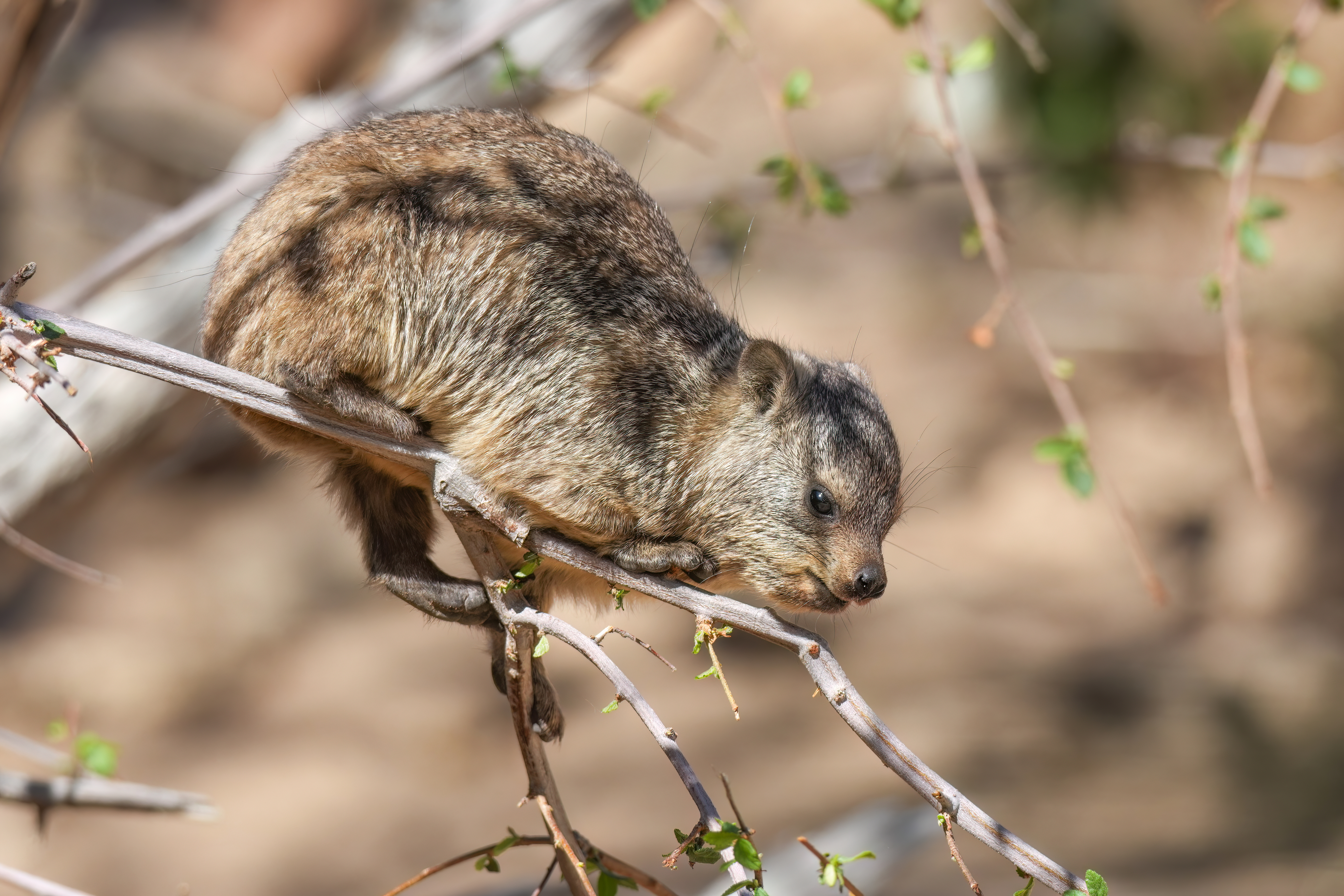
Climbing a tree in search of browse

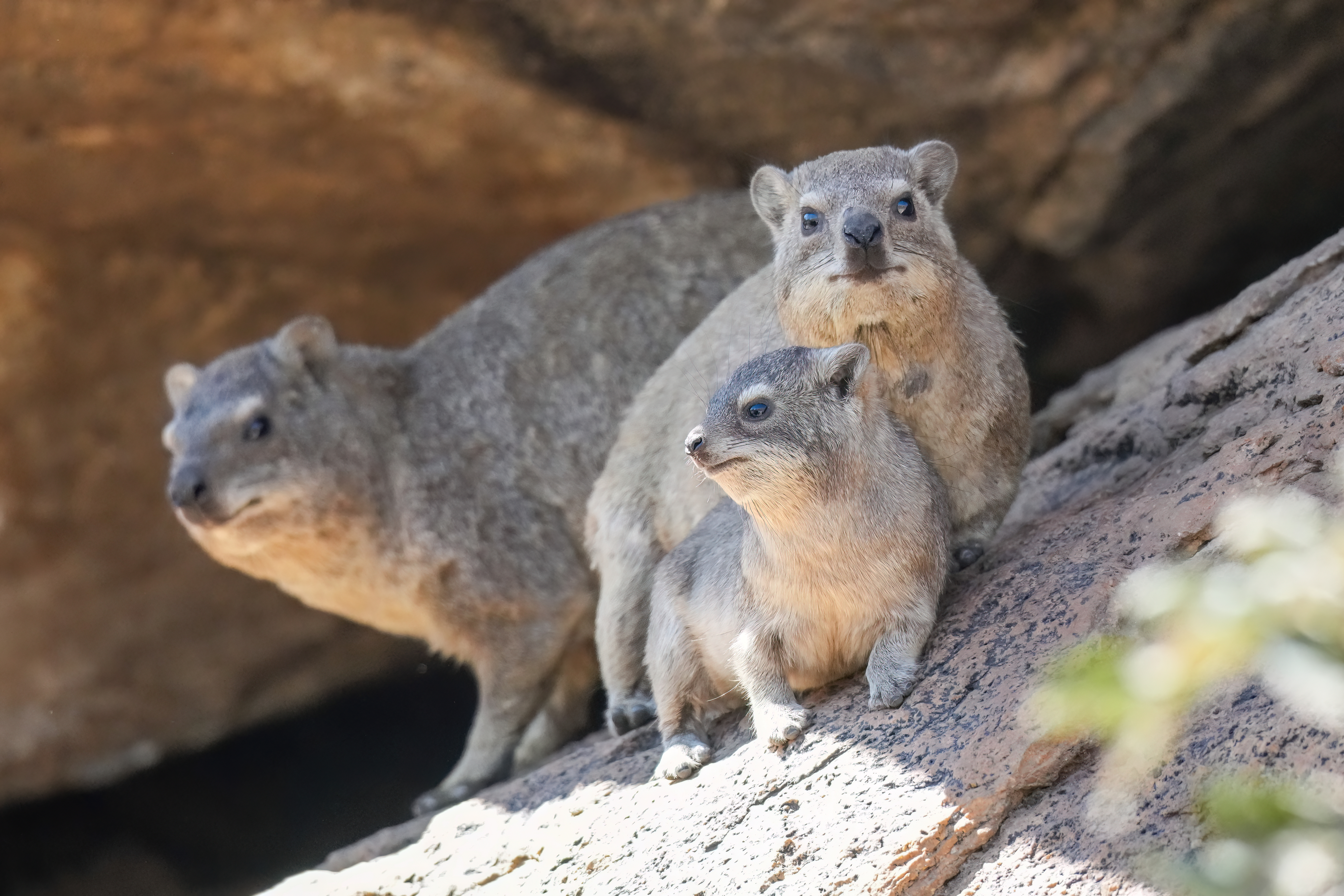
Family in Damaraland, Namibia

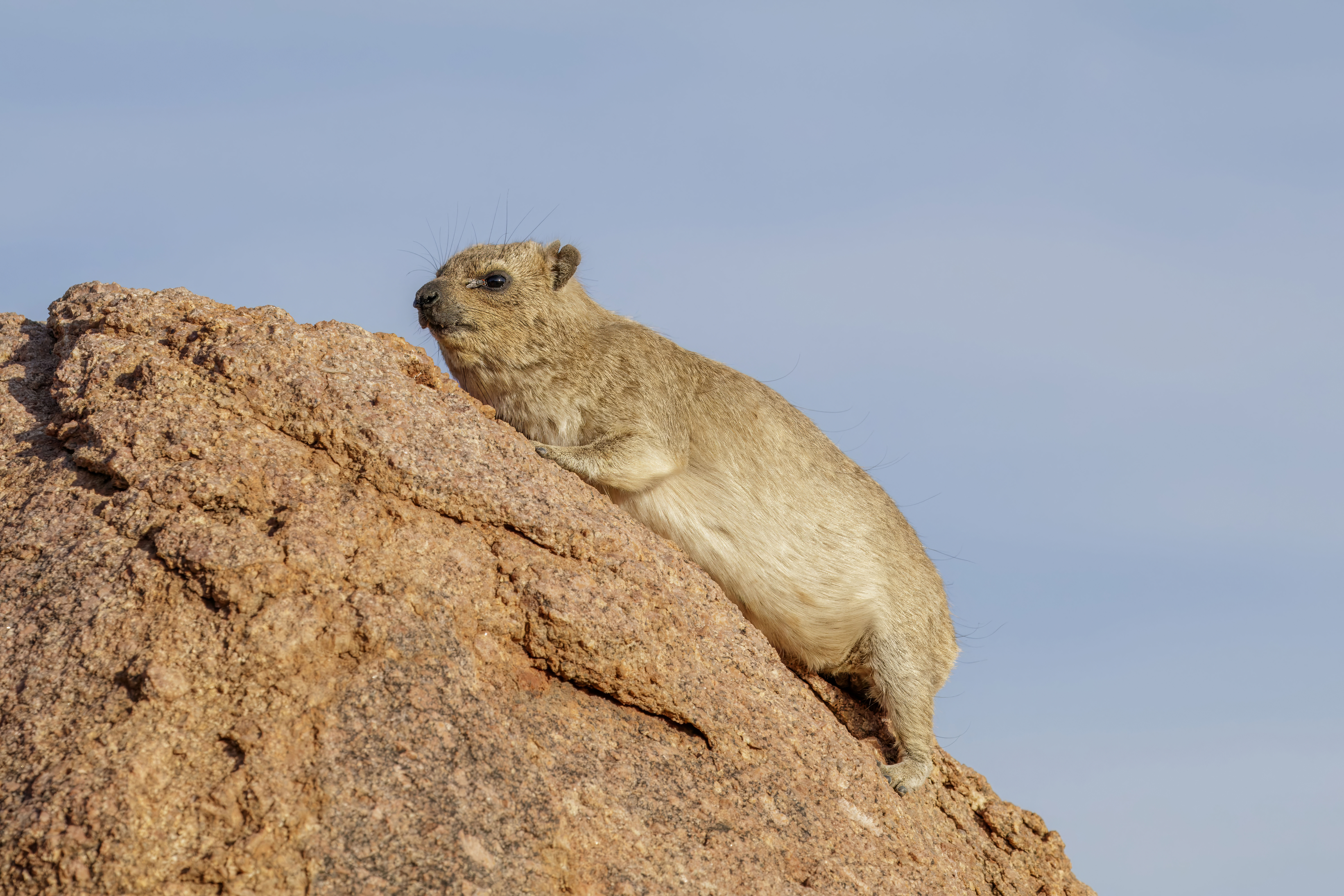
Basking at Erongo, Namibia

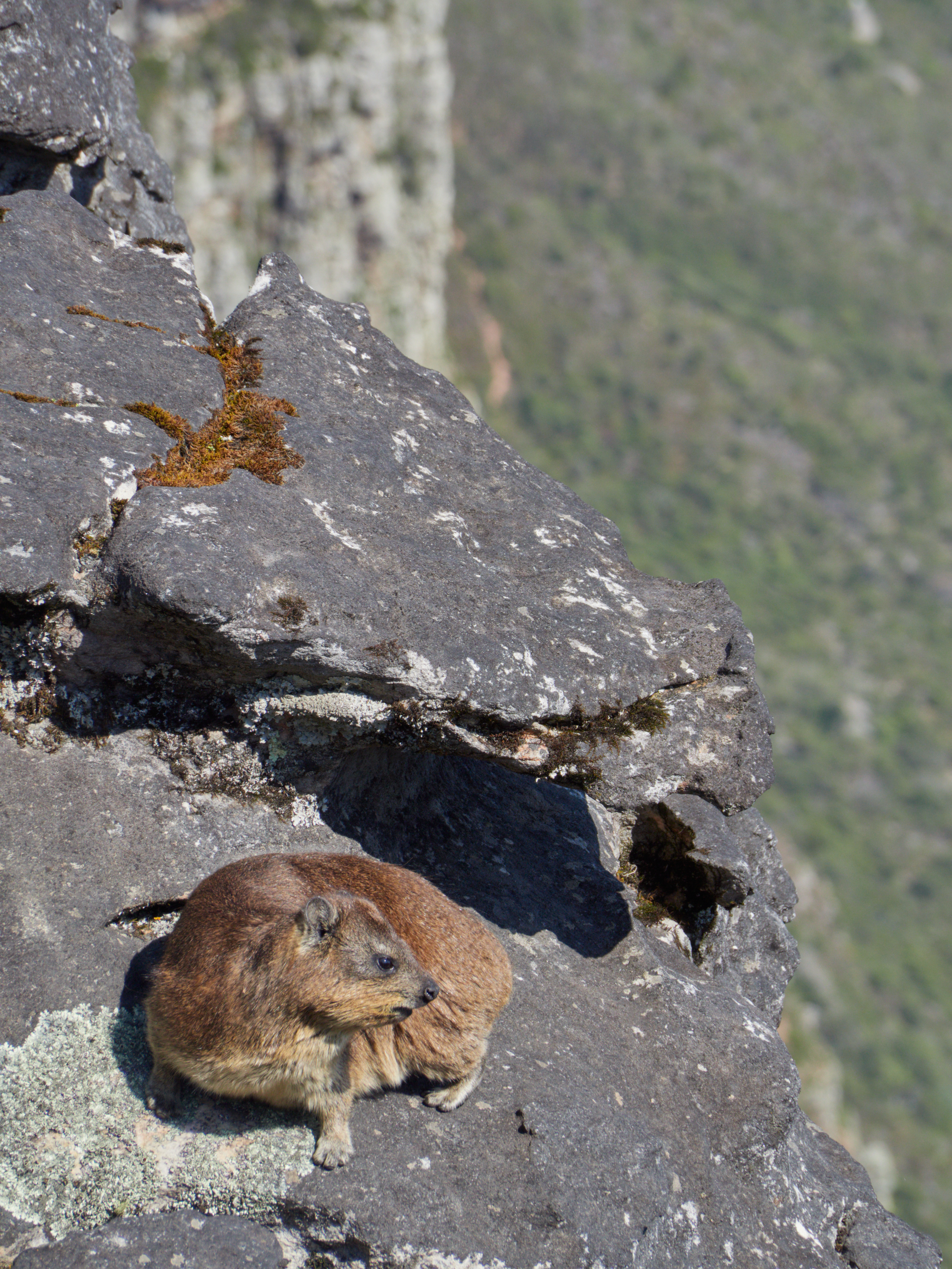
Resting on a cliff ledge on Table Mountain, South Africa

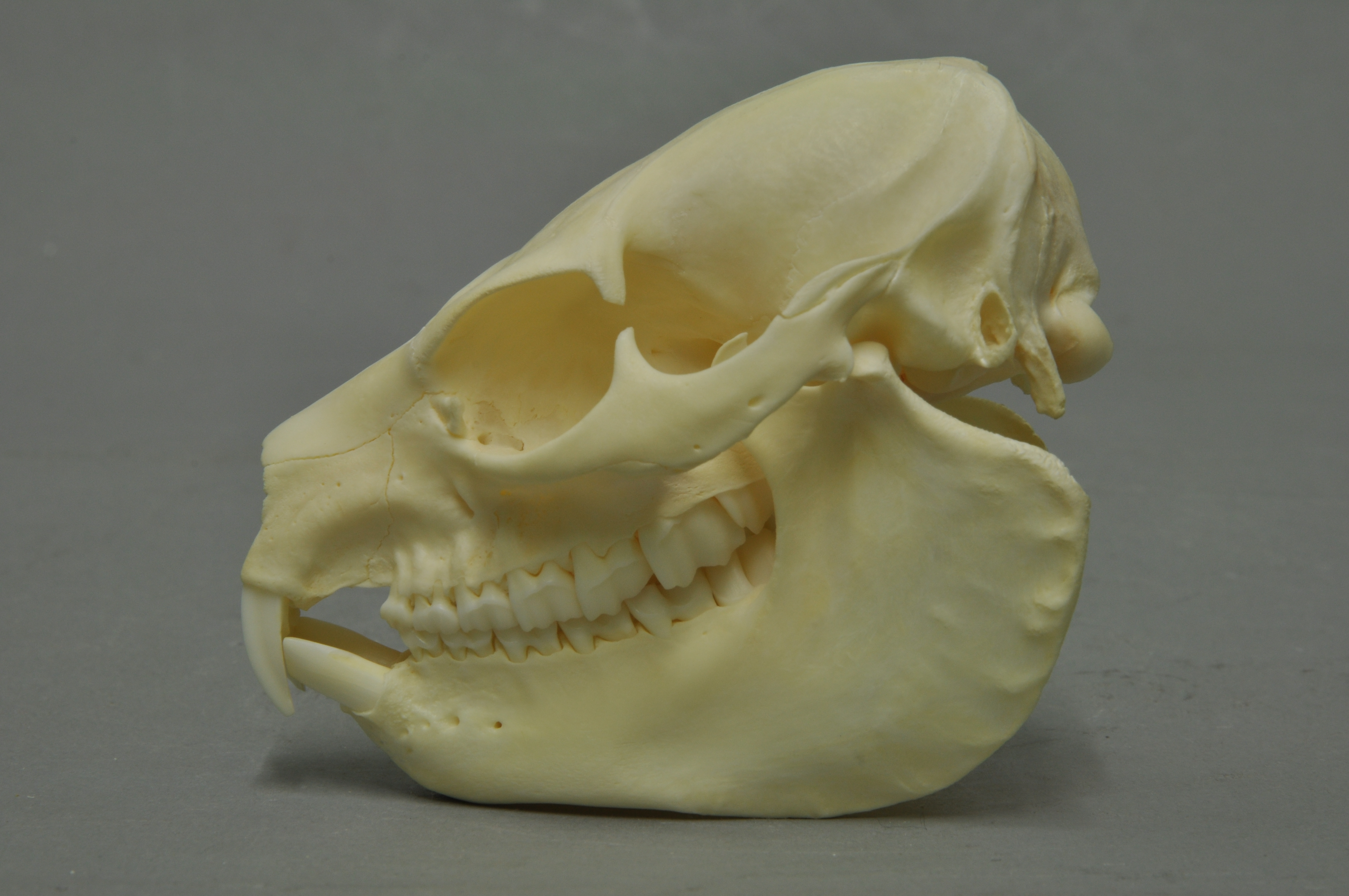
Skull of a rock hyrax

Animated skull, Namibia

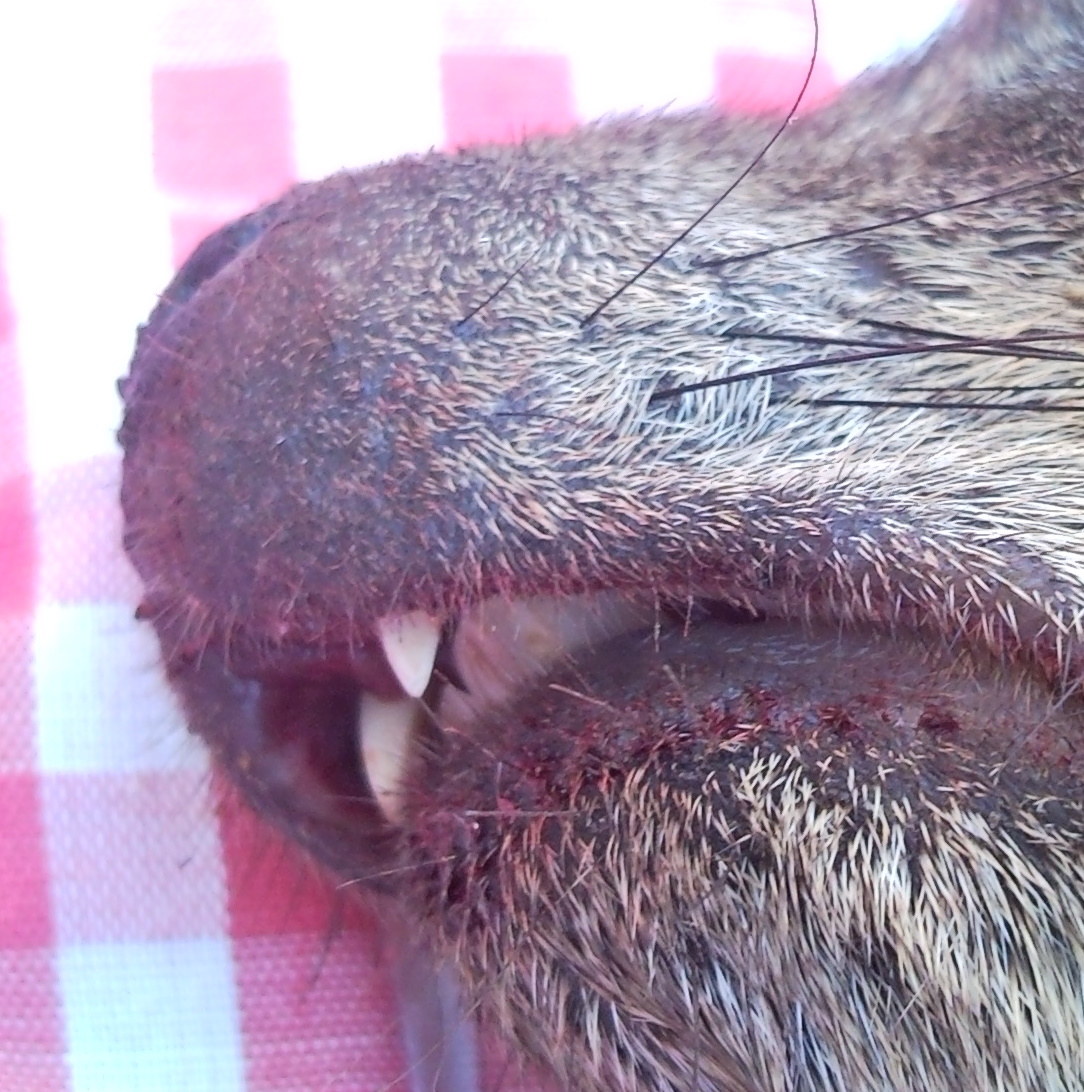
The unusual incisors

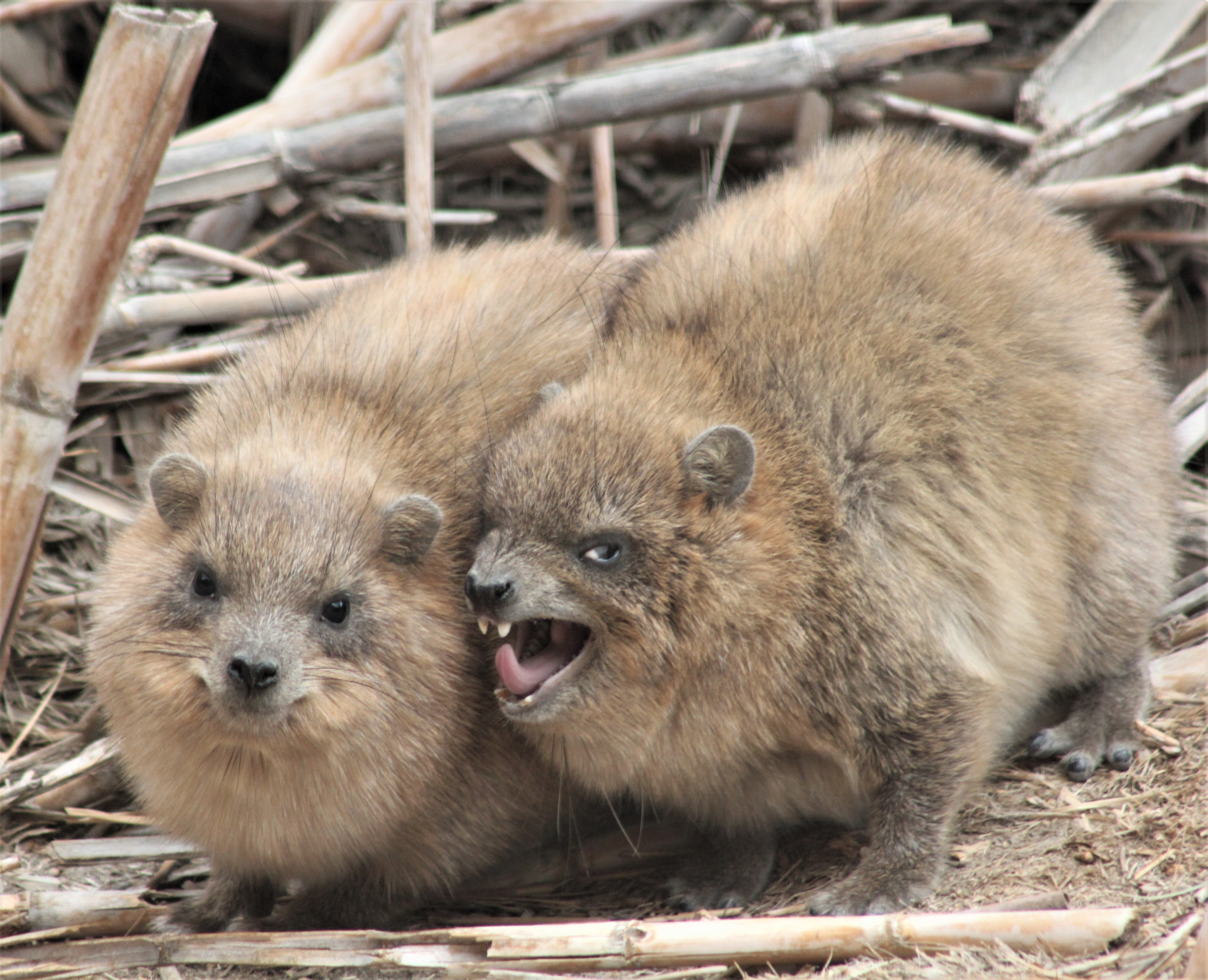
Rock hyrax showing incisors and tongue, at Ein Gedi, Israel

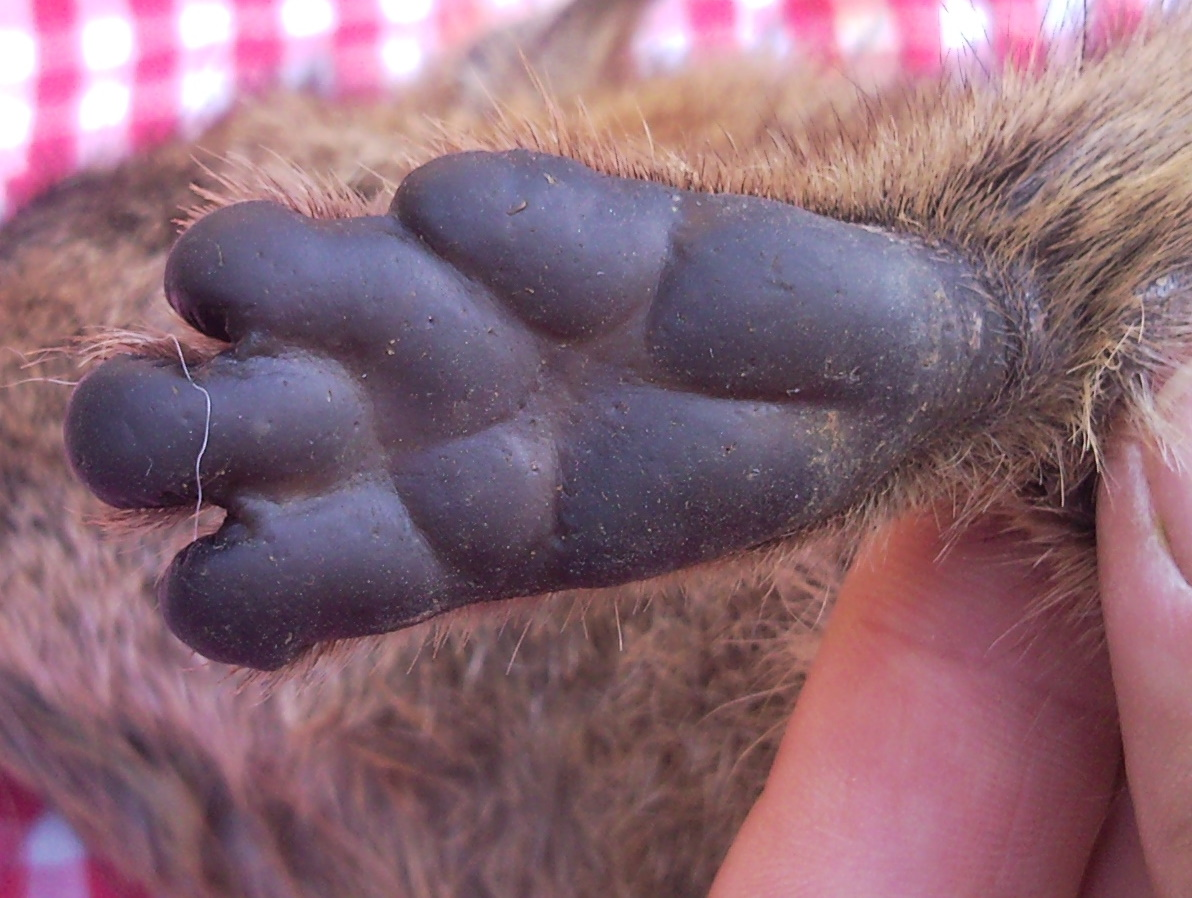
The characteristic foot pads

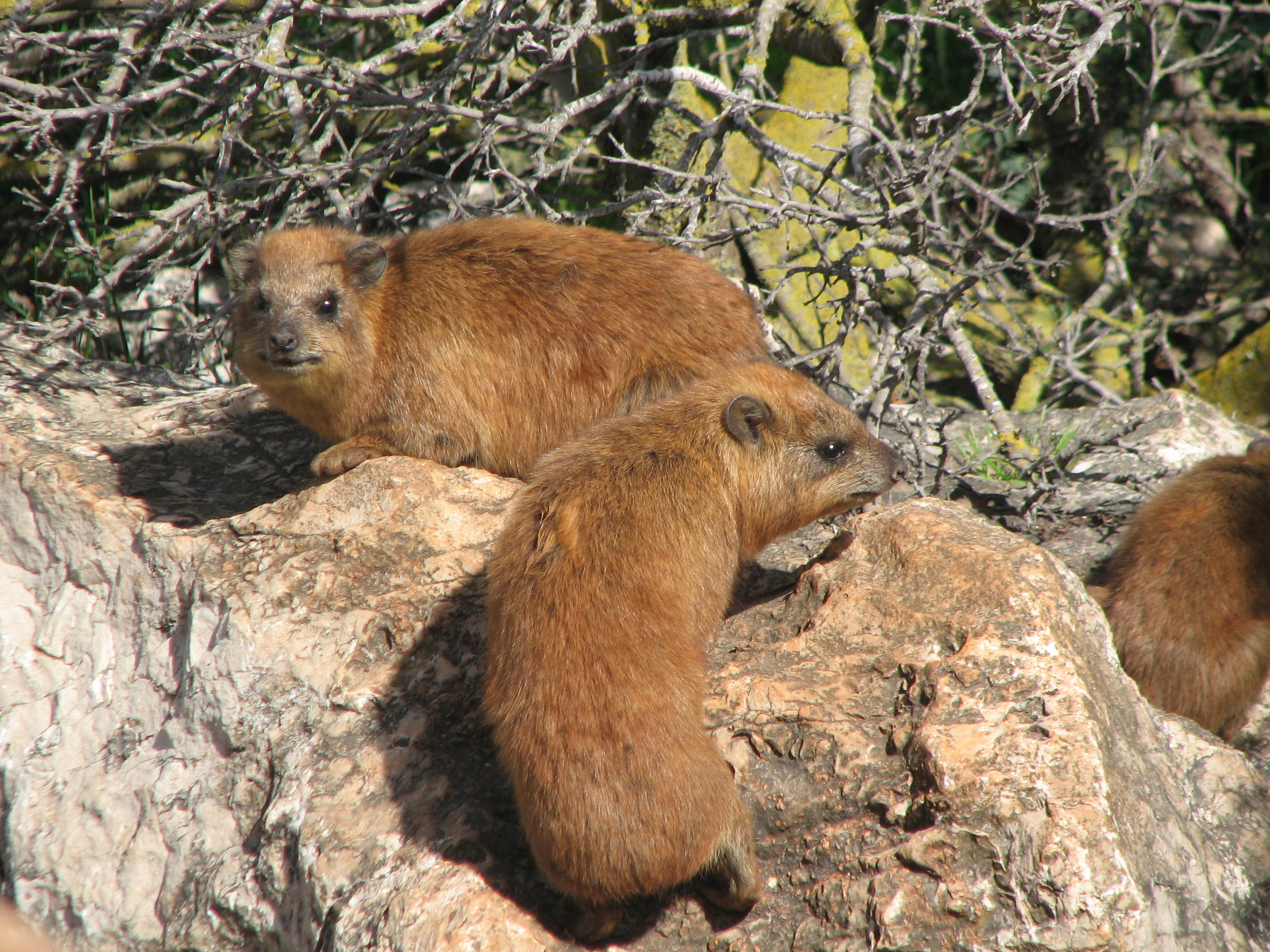
The dorsal gland visible as a patch of fur with lighter colour

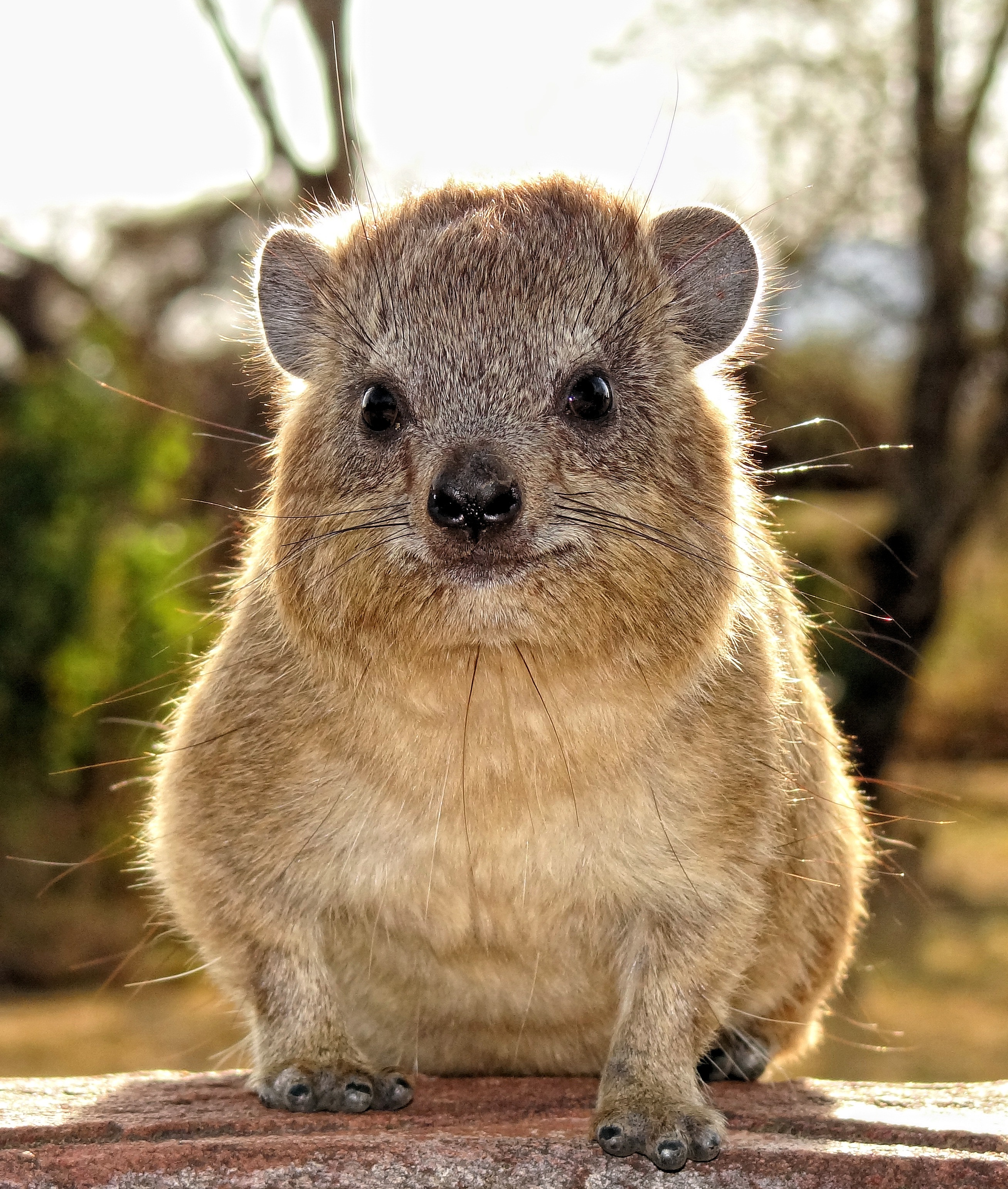
The rock hyrax is a stoutly built, rotund animal

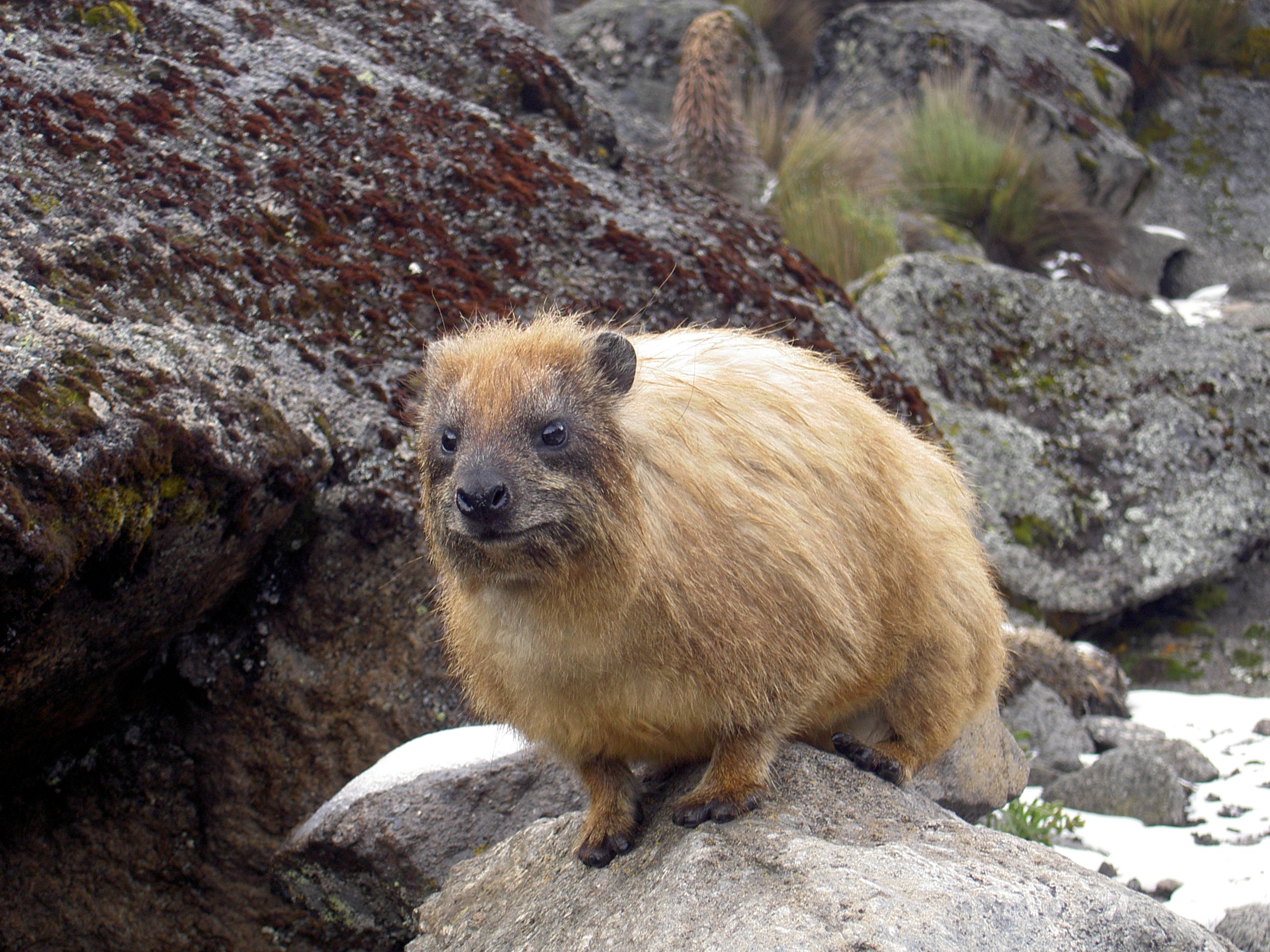
Rock hyrax from Mt Kenya

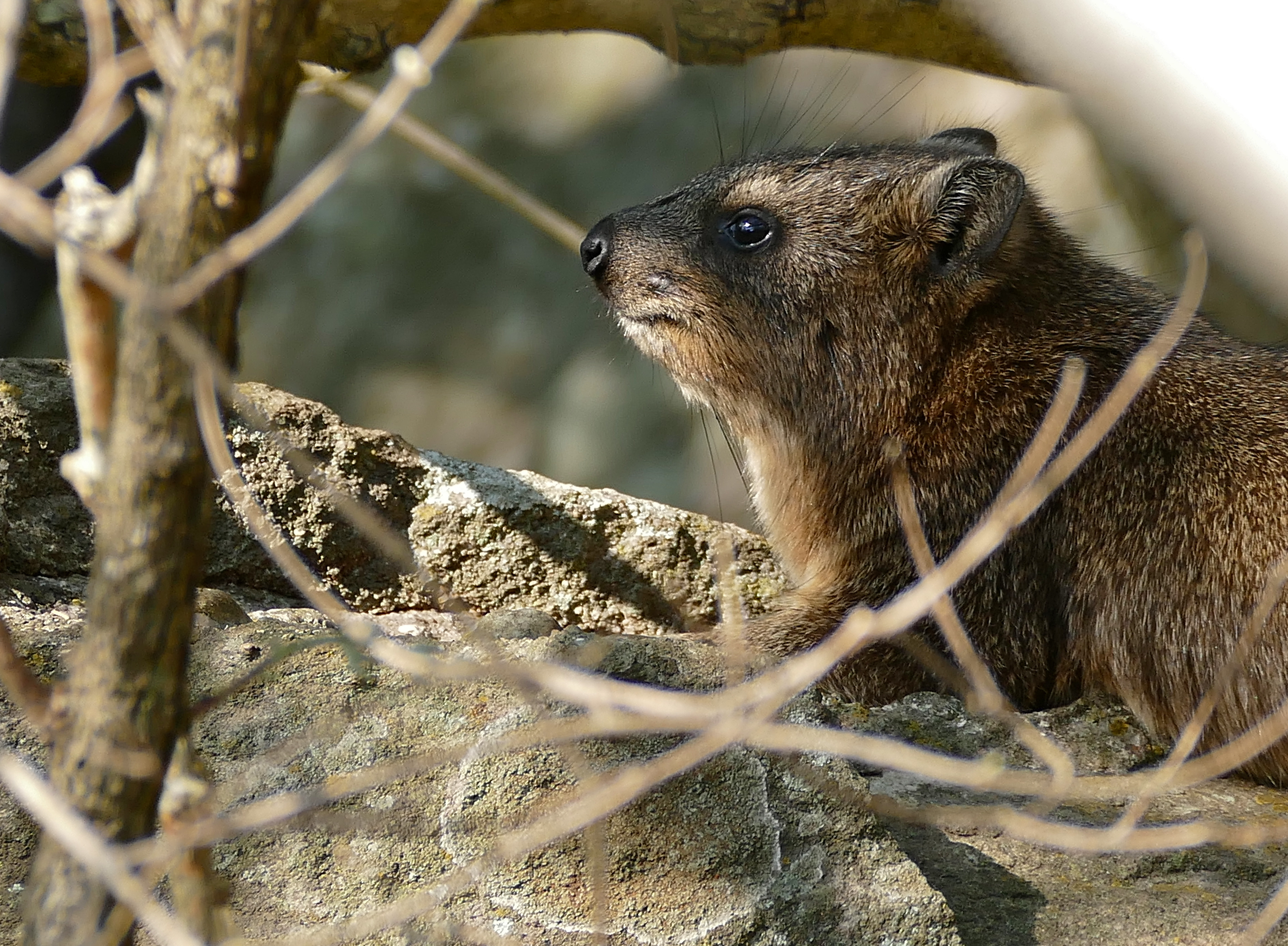
Rock hyrax from KwaZulu-Natal

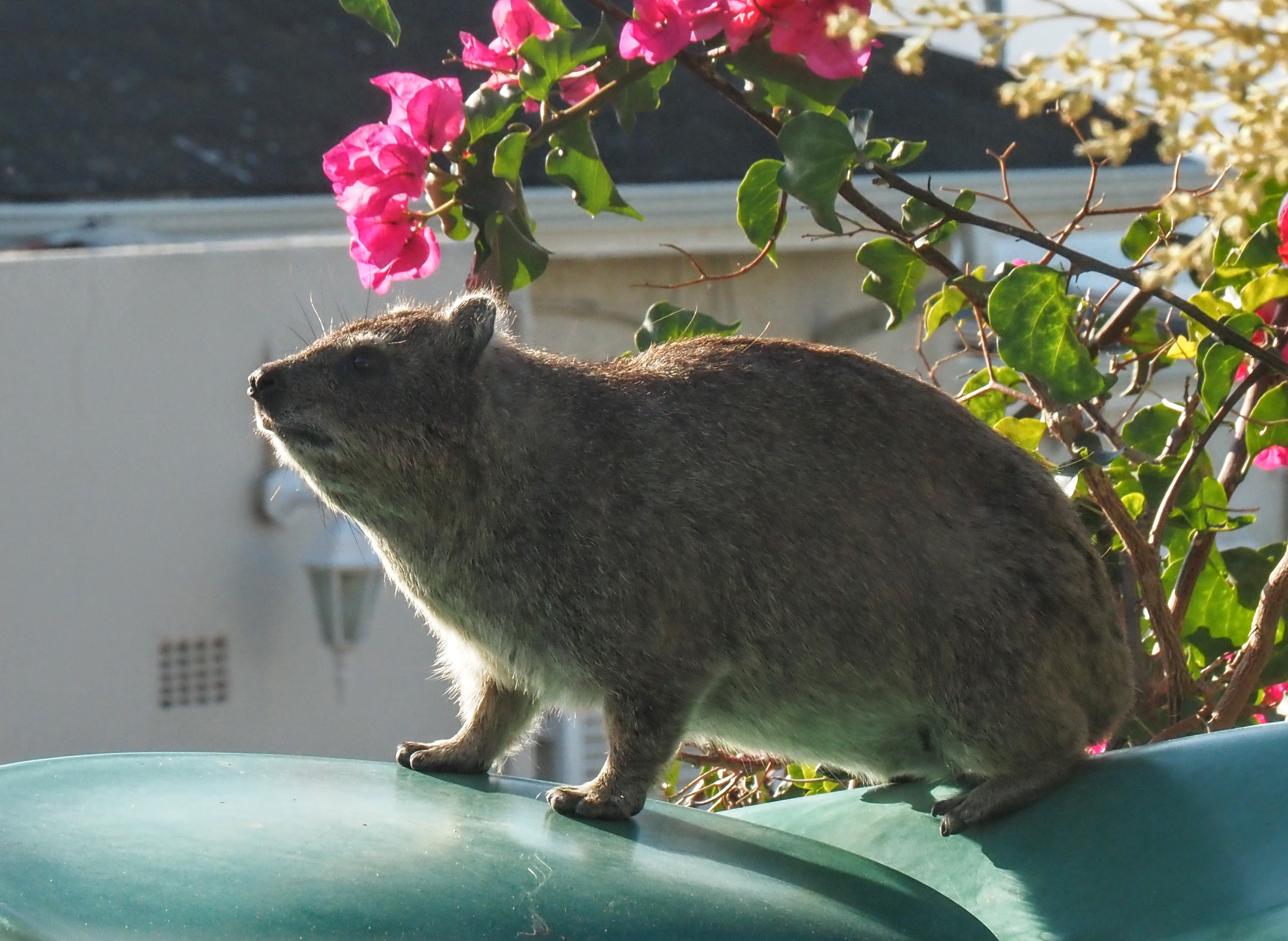
Dassie in a Cape Peninsula suburb

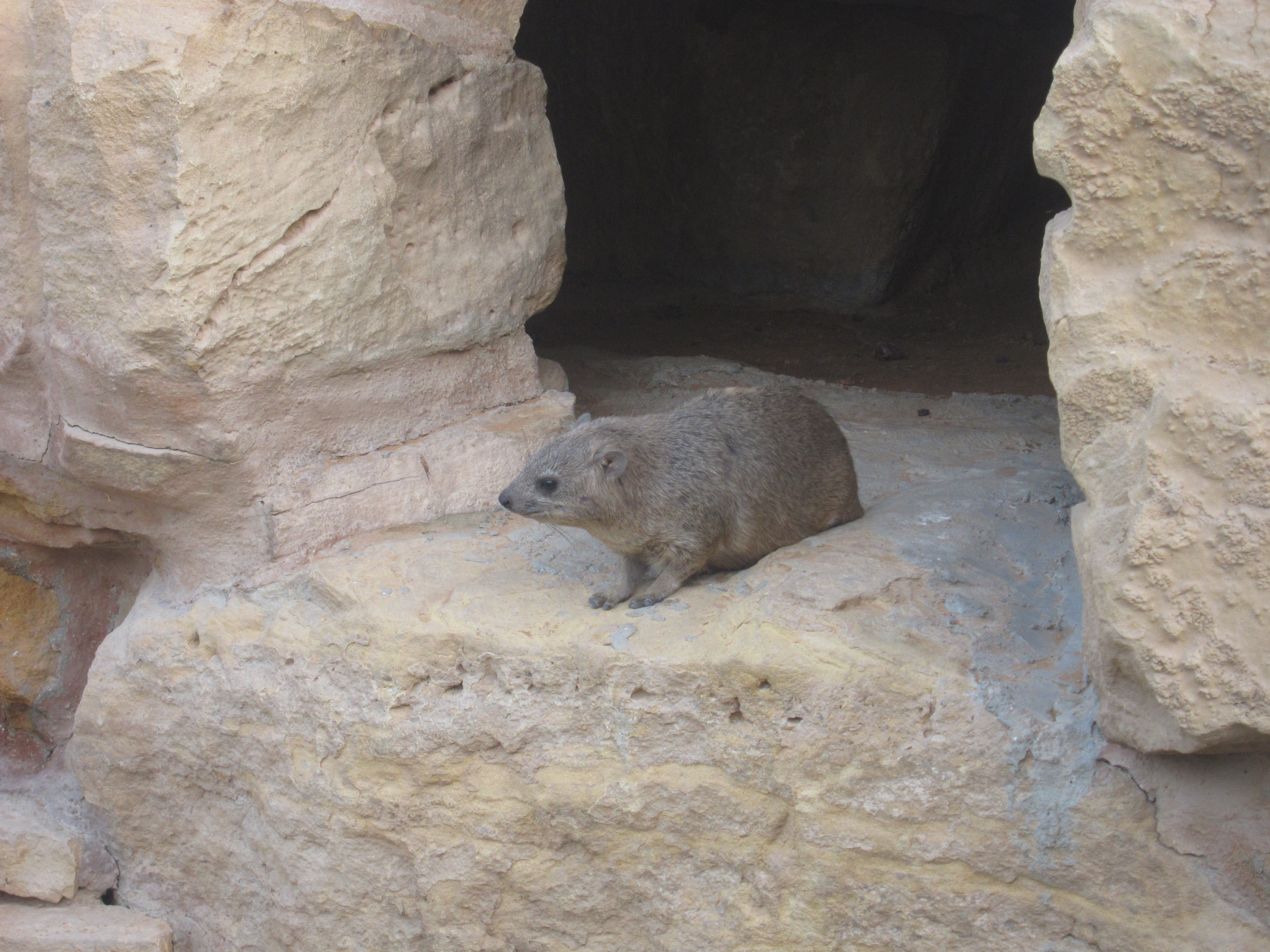
Rock hyrax in captivity

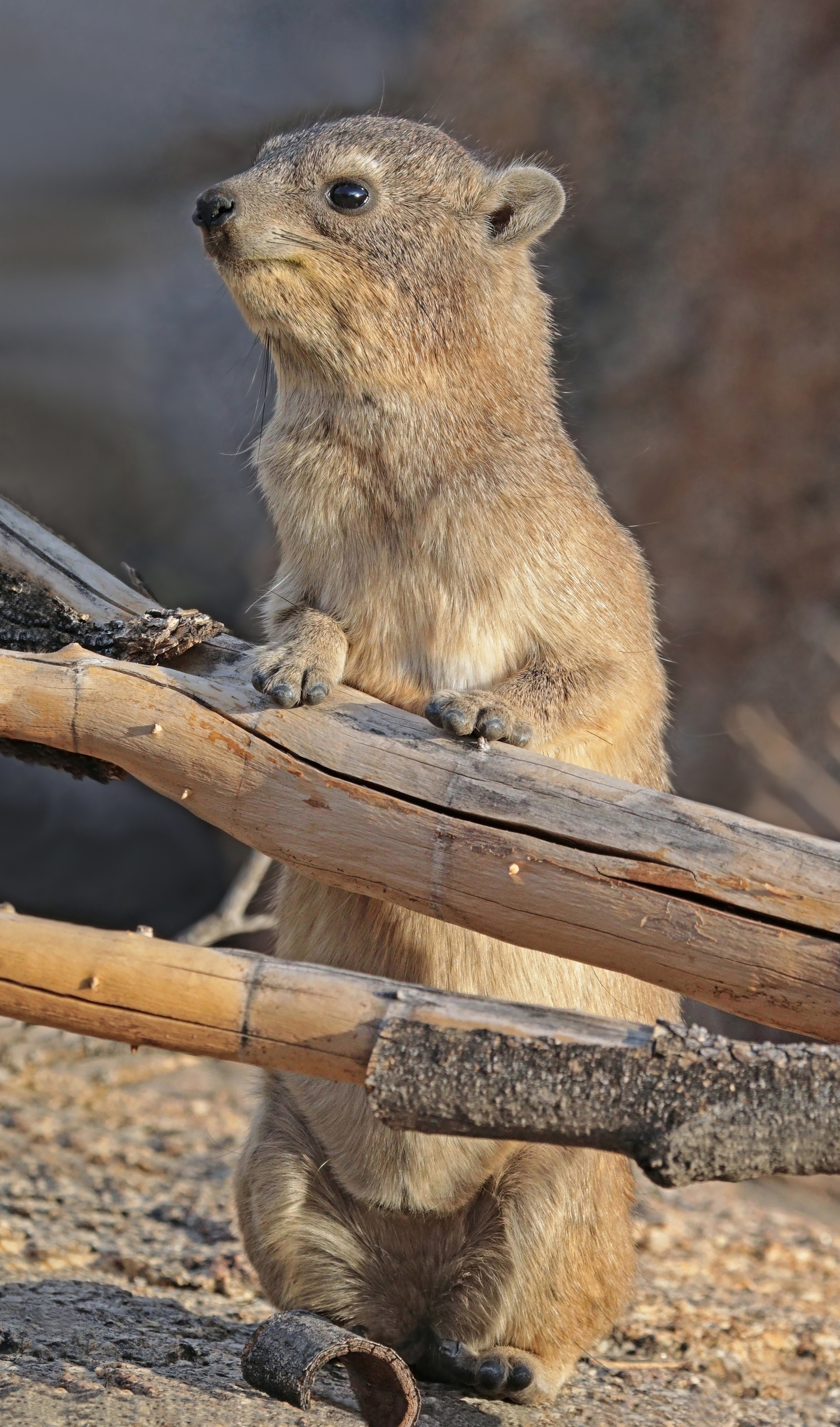
In Namibia

== Distribution and geographic variation ==
The rock hyrax occurs widely across sub-Saharan Africa in disjunct northern and southern populations; it is absent from the Congo Basin and Madagascar. The distribution encompasses southern Algeria, Libya, Egypt, and the Middle East, with populations in Israel, Jordan, Lebanon, and the Arabian Peninsula. The northern subspecies was introduced to Jebel Hafeet, which is on the border of Oman and the United Arab Emirates.

The shade of their pelts varies individually and regionally. In particular, the dorsal patches (present in both sexes) of the central populations are very variable, ranging from yellow to black, or flecked. In outlying populations, these are more constant in colour, black in P. c. capensis, cream in P. c. welwitschii, and orange in P. c. ruficeps. A larger, longer-haired population is abundant in the moraines in the alpine zone of Mount Kenya.

=== Subspecies ===
The subspecies, which are sometimes elevated to full species, are:

- P. c. capensis (Pallas, 1766) – Cape rock hyrax, native to South Africa and Namibia
- P. c. habessinicus (Hemprich and Ehrenberg, 1832) – Ethiopian rock hyrax, native to northeastern Africa and Arabia
- P. c. johnstoni Thomas, 1894 – black-necked rock hyrax, native to central and East Africa
- P. c. ruficeps (Hemprich and Ehrenberg, 1832) – red-headed rock hyrax, native to the southern Sahara
- P. c. welwitschii (Gray, 1868) – Kaokoveld rock hyrax, native to the Kaokoveld of Namibia

== Ecology and behavior ==
Rock hyraxes build dwelling holes in any type of rock with suitable cavities, such as sedimentary rocks and soil. In Mount Kenya, rock hyraxes live in colonies comprising an adult male, several adult females, and immatures. They are active during the day, and sometimes during moonlit nights. The dominant male defends and watches over the group. The male also marks his territory.

In Africa, hyraxes are preyed on by leopards, Egyptian cobras, puff adders, rock pythons, caracals, wild dogs, hawks, and owls. Verreaux's eagle in particular is a specialist hunter of hyraxes. In the Middle East, the rock hyrax is reportedly rarely preyed upon by terrestrial predators, as their system of sentries and reliable refuges provides considerable protection. Hyrax remains are almost absent from the droppings of wolves in the Judaean Desert.

=== Feeding and foraging ===
Hyrax making a chewing motion

Hyraxes feed on a wide variety of plant species, including Lobelia and broad-leafed plants. They also have been reported to eat insects and grubs. They forage for food up to about 50 m from their refuge, usually feeding as a group and with one or more acting as sentries from a prominent lookout position. On the approach of danger, the sentries give an alarm call, and the animals quickly retreat to their refuge.

They are able to go for many days without water due to the moisture they obtain through their food, but quickly dehydrate under direct sunlight. Despite their seemingly clumsy build, they are able to climb trees (although not as readily as Heterohyrax), and readily enter residential gardens to feed on the leaves of citrus and other trees.

The rock hyrax also makes a loud, grunting sound while moving its jaws as if chewing, and this behaviour may be a sign of aggression. Some authors have proposed that observation of this behavior by ancient Israelites gave rise to the misconception given in the Book of Leviticus 11:4–8 that the hyrax chews the cud, but the hyrax is not a ruminant.

=== Reproduction ===
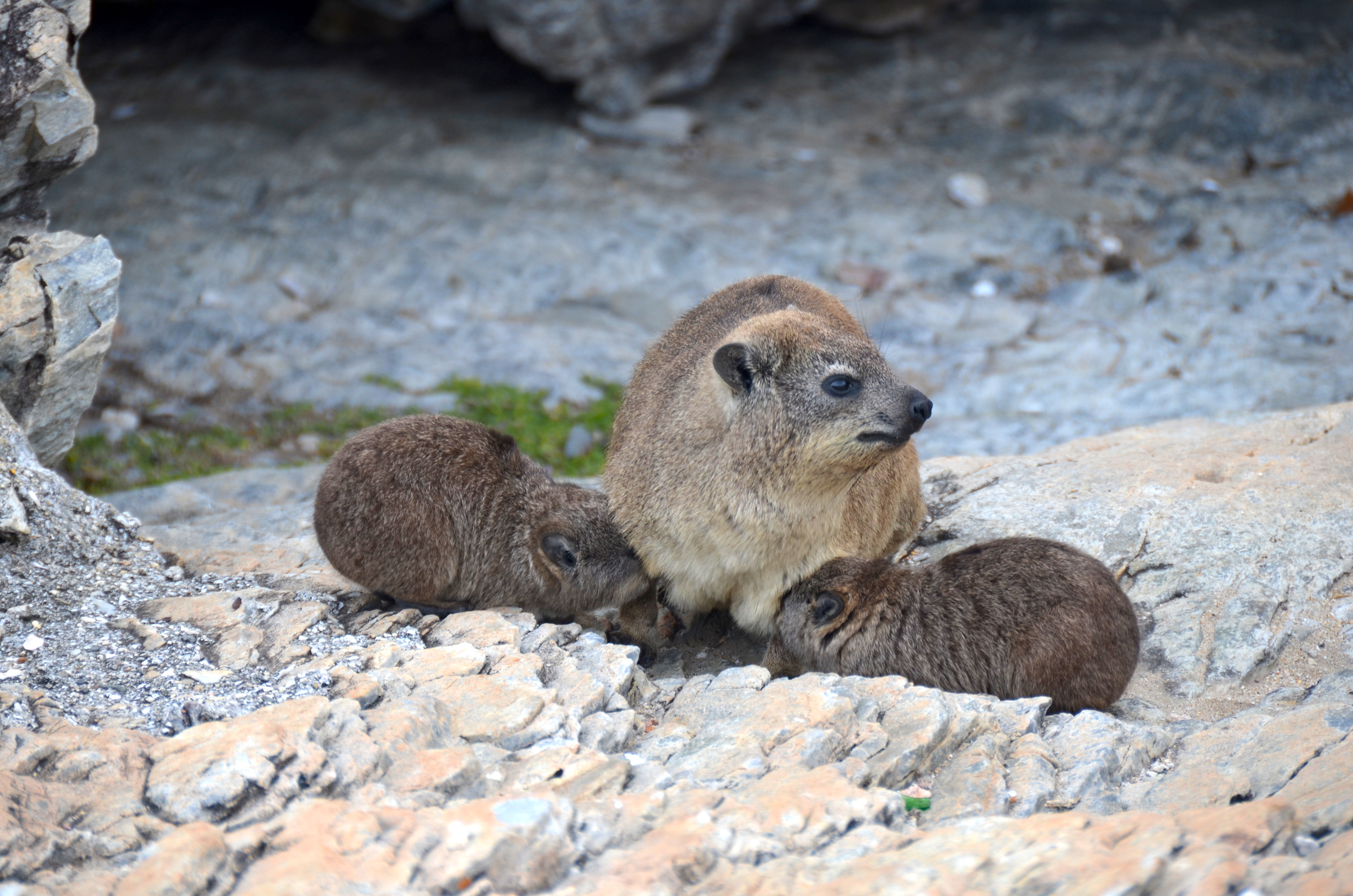
Suckling rock hyrax

Rock hyraxes give birth to two to four young after a gestation period of 6–7 months (long, for their size). The young are well developed at birth with fully opened eyes and complete pelage. Young can ingest solid food after two weeks and are weaned at 10 weeks. After 16 months, they become sexually mature, they reach adult size at 3 years, and they typically live about 10 years. During seasonal changes, the weight of the male reproductive organs (testes, seminal vesicles) changes due to sexual activity. Between May and January in Cape Province, South Africa, the males are inactive sexually. From February onward, the weight of these organs increases dramatically and the males are able to copulate.

=== Social behavior ===
==== Group structure ====
Hyraxes that live in more "egalitarian" groups, in which social associations are spread more evenly among group members, survive longer. In addition, hyraxes are the first nonhuman species in which structural balance was described. They follow "the friend of my friend is my friend" rule, and avoid unbalanced social configurations. The balance of social interactions within a group is positively correlated to individual longevity, meaning that "it is not the number or strength of associations that an adult individual has (i.e. centrality) that is important, but the overall configuration of social relationships within the group." The reason for such a balanced group configuration, rather than one that is centrally dominated by a few individual hyraxes, was suggested to have to do with the fact that information flow to all members is important in a fragmented habitat as that of the hyrax, making a dominance hierarchy a liability for the survival of the group at large.

==== Vocalisations ====
Captive rock hyraxes make more than 20 different noises and vocal signals. The most familiar one is a high trill, given in response to perceived danger. Rock hyrax calls can provide important biological information, such as size, age, social status, body weight, condition, and hormonal state of the caller, as determined by measuring their call length, patterns, complexity, and frequency. More recently, researchers have found rich syntactic structure and geographical variations in the calls of rock hyraxes, a first in the vocalization of mammalian taxa other than primates, cetaceans, and bats. Higher-ranked males tend to sing more often, and the energetic cost of singing is relatively low. A recent study found that snorts, a rare aspect of male hyrax songs, play an important signalling role as well, with increasing snort harshness being associated with "the progression of inner excitement or aggression". It is also positively associated with the singing animal's social status and testosterone levels. Singing has also been shown to be a marker of an individual hyrax's unique identity, where identity is expressed by unique vocal signatures "that are not condition dependent and are stable over years in singers that did not alter their spatial position."

==== Resting ====
The rock hyrax spends roughly 95% of its time resting. During this time, it can often be seen basking in the sun, which sometimes involves "heaping", where several animals pile on top of each other. This is thought to be an element of its complex thermoregulation.

=== Dispersal ===
Male hyraxes have been categorised into four classes: territorial, peripheral, early dispersers, and late dispersers. The territorial males are dominant. Peripheral males are more solitary and sometimes take over a group when the dominant male is missing. Early-dispersing males are juveniles that leave the birth site around 16 to 24 months of age. Late dispersers are also juvenile males, but they leave the birth site much later, around 30 or more months of age.

== Names ==
The species is known as klipdas in Afrikaans (etymology: rock + badger), while most people just call them "dassies" (the plural of dassie) or "rock rabbits" in South Africa. The Swahili names for them are pimbi, pelele, and wibari, though the latter two names are nowadays reserved for the tree hyraxes. This species has many subspecies, many of which are also known as rock or Cape hyrax, although the former usually refers to African varieties.

In Arabic, the rock hyrax is called الوبر الصخري (alwabr alsakhri) or طبسون (tabsoun). In Classical Hebrew, the rock hyrax is called שָׁפָן (shafan). In Modern Hebrew, this word colloquially refers to the rabbit, while שפן סלע (shafan sela) is used for hyrax. According to Gerald Durrell, local people in Bafut, Cameroon, call the rock hyrax the n'eer.

== Naturopathic use ==
Rock hyraxes produce large quantities of hyraceum, a sticky mass of dung and urine that has been employed as a South African folk remedy in the treatment of several medical disorders, including epilepsy and convulsions. Hyraceum is now being used by perfumers, who tincture it in alcohol to yield a natural animal musk.

== In culture ==
The rock hyrax is classified as treif (not kosher; unclean) according to kashrut – Jewish food hygiene rules – due to statements in the Torah: "And the coney, because he cheweth the cud, but divideth not the hoof; he is unclean unto you" (Leviticus 11:5). Hyraxes are also mentioned in Proverbs 30:26 as one of a number of remarkable animals for being small but exceedingly wise, in this case because "the conies are a people not mighty, yet they make their homes in the cliffs".

In Joy Adamson's books and the film Born Free, a rock hyrax called Pati-Pati was her companion for six years before Elsa and her siblings came along; Pati-Pati reportedly took the role of nanny and watched over them with great care.

The 2013 animated film Khumba features a number of rock hyraxes that sacrifice one of their own to a white Verreaux's eagle.

== Gallery ==
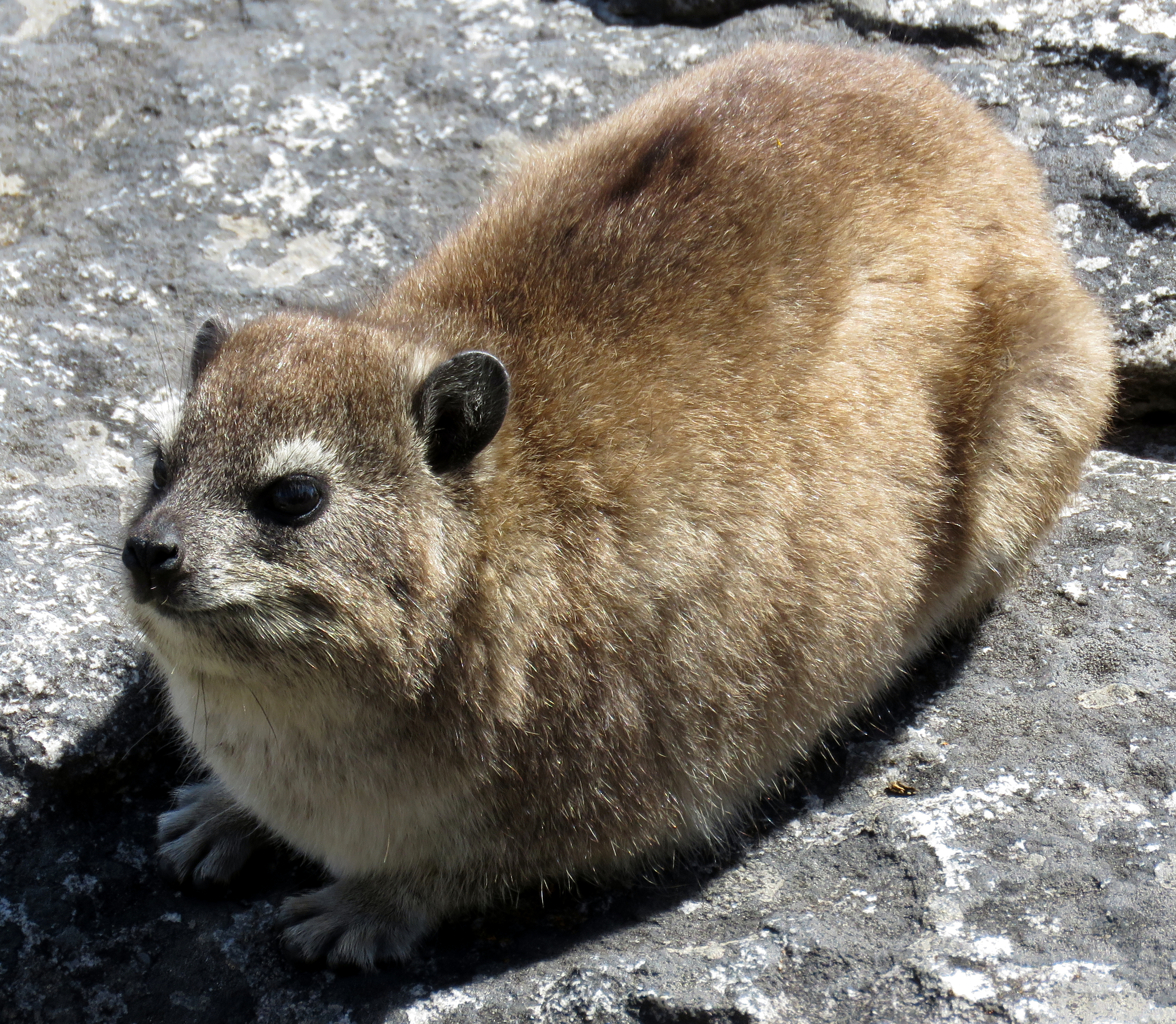
Rock hyrax can reach a length of 50 cm (20 in) and weigh around 4 kg (8.8 lb).

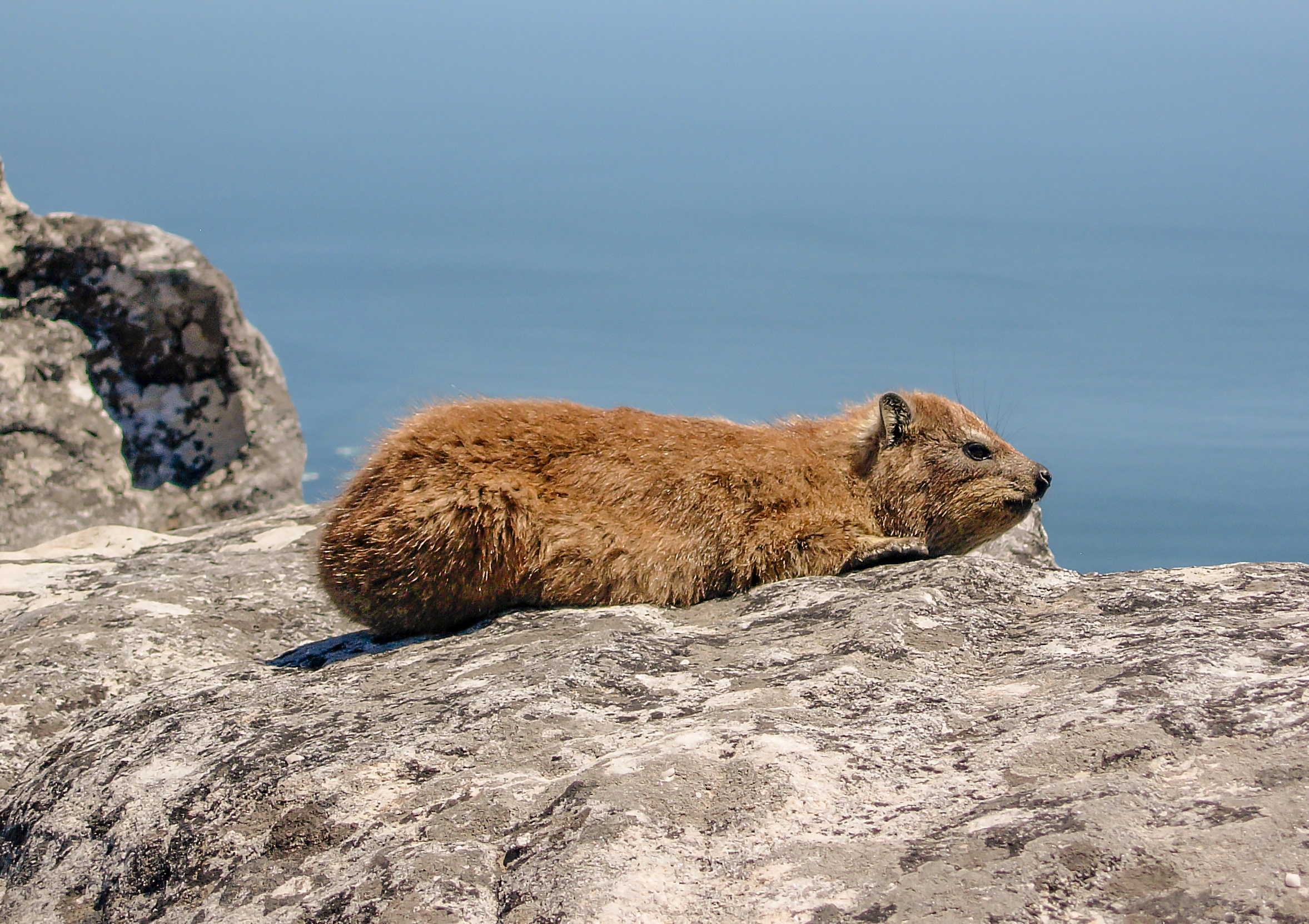
Basking on Table Mountain, South Africa

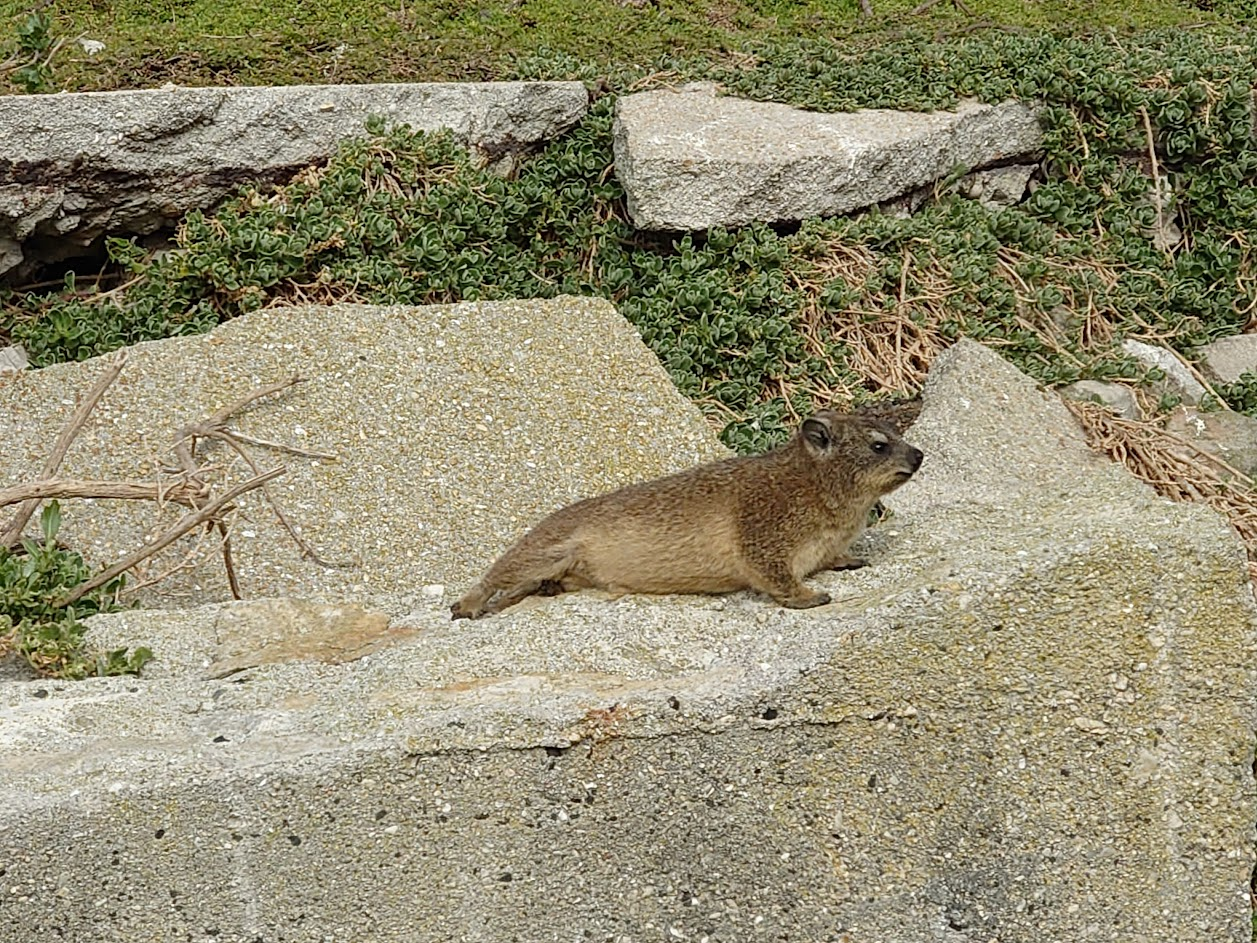
Klipdassie in a coastal setting at Betty's Bay, South Africa

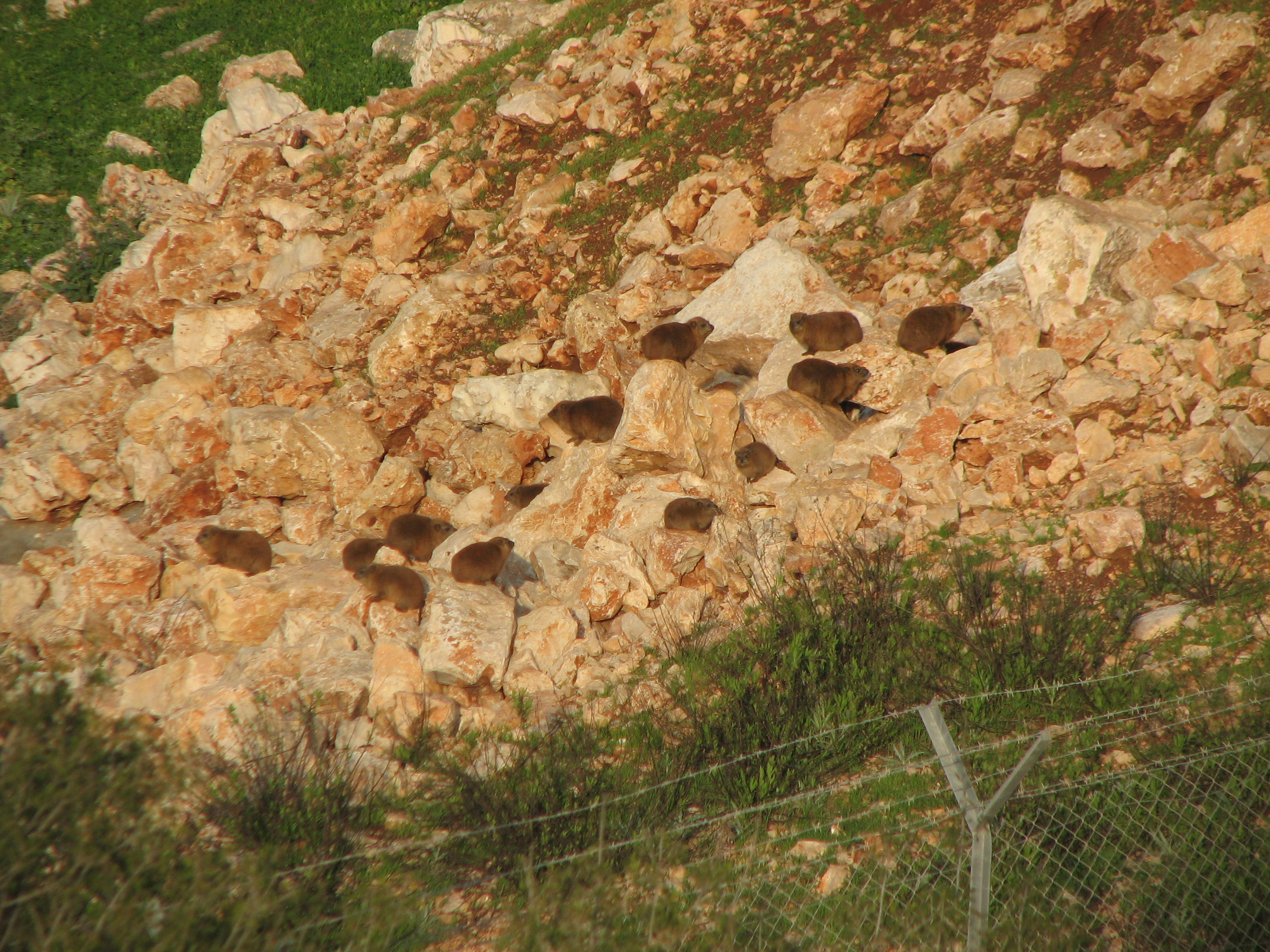
A colony of hyraxes in northern Israel

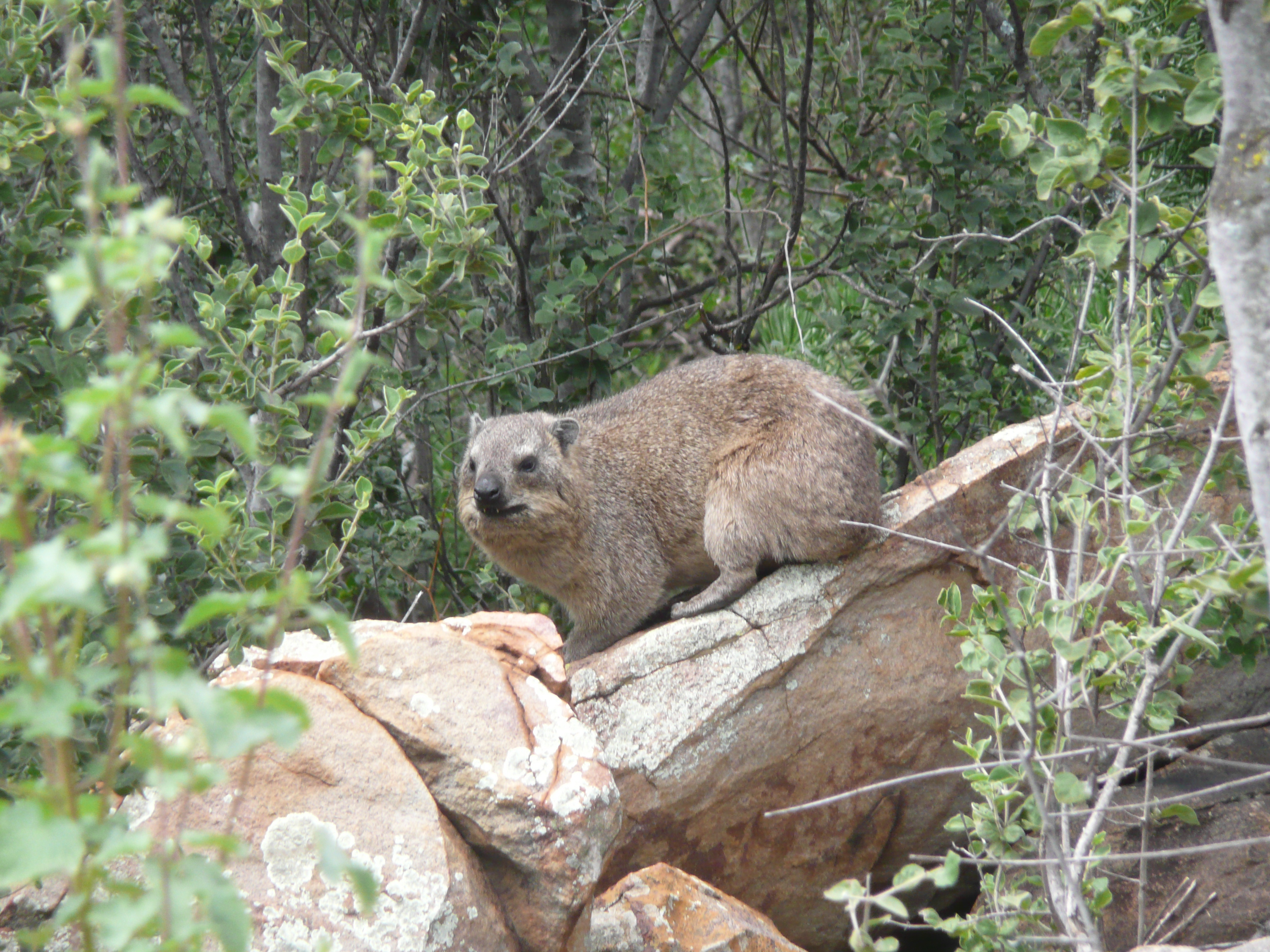
Rock hyrax in the botanical garden of Pretoria, South Africa

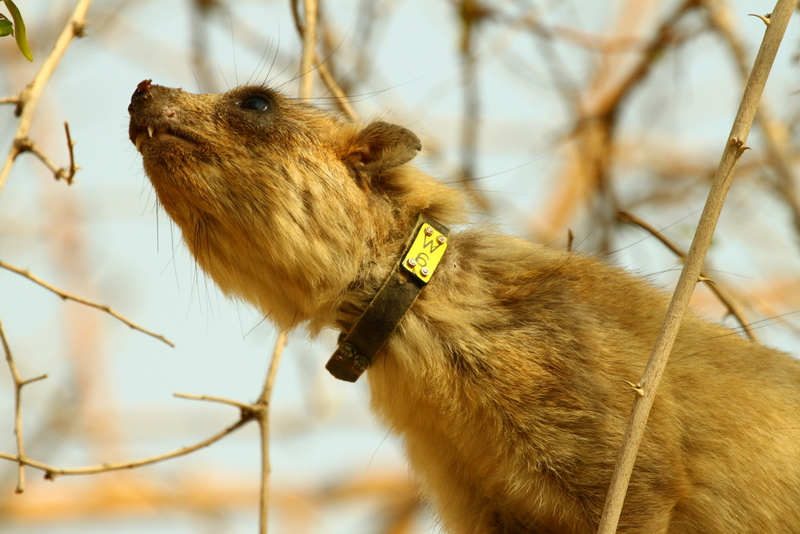
A collar-tagged rock hyrax at Ein Gedi, Israel

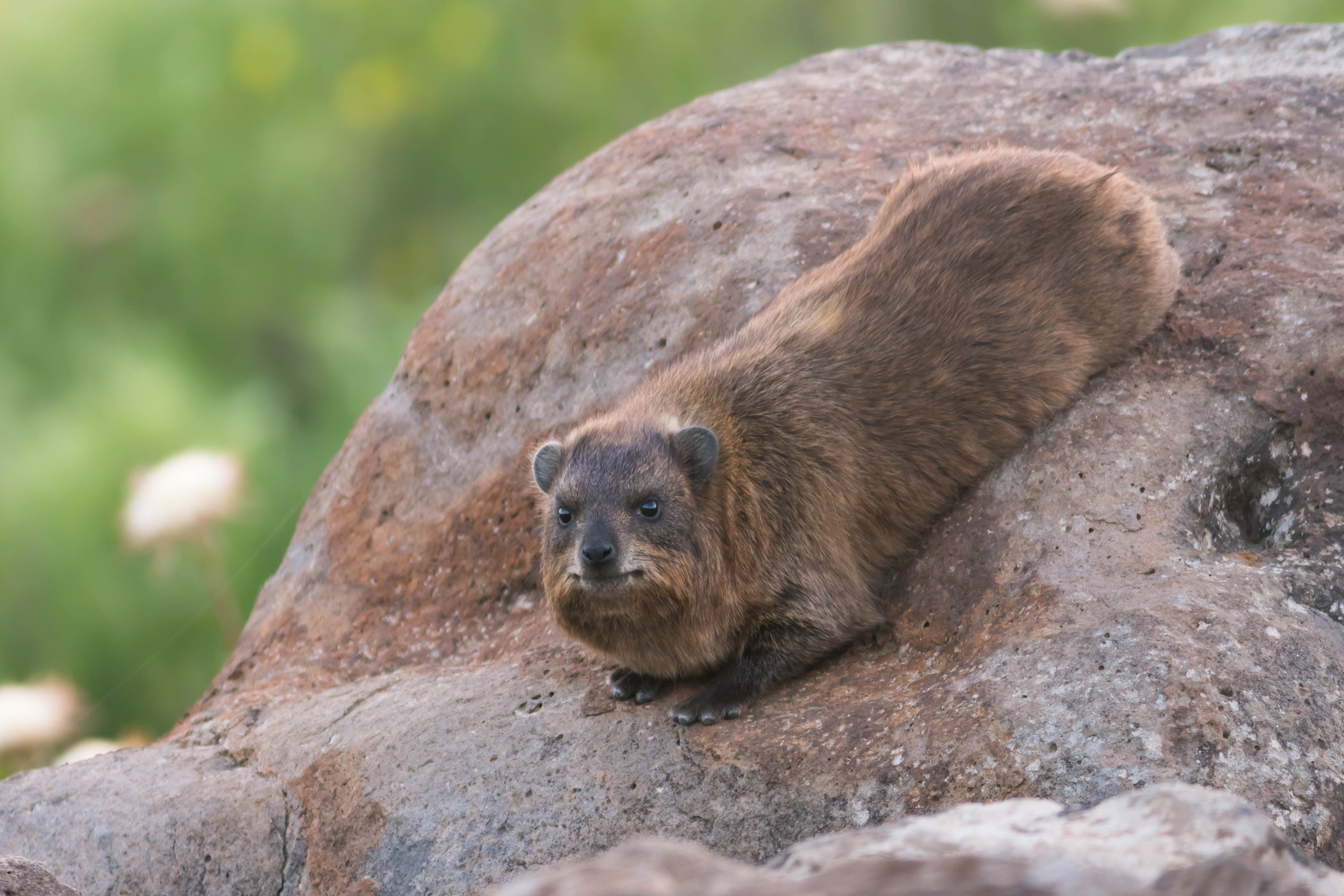
Rock hyrax, Katzrin, Golan Heights

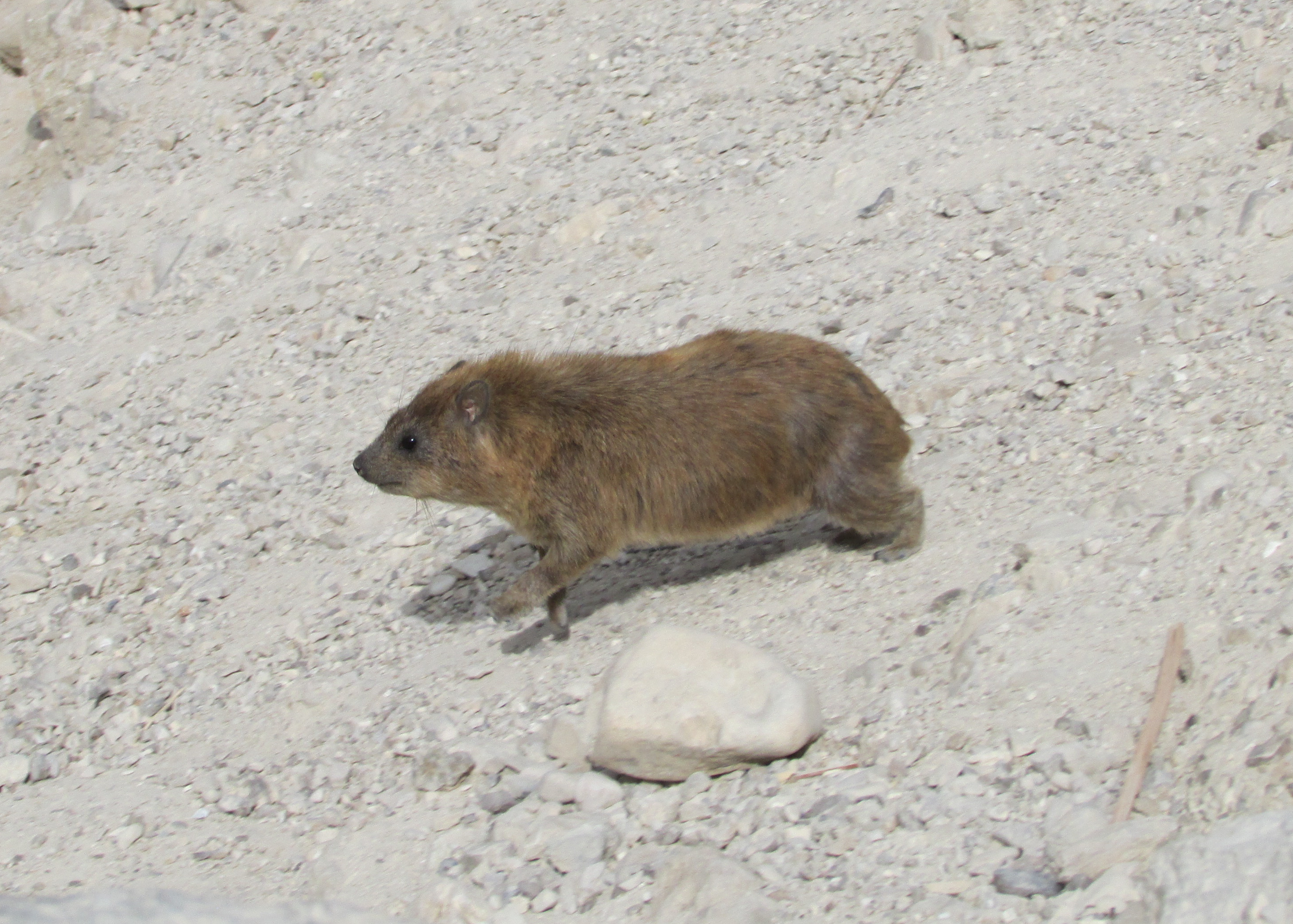
Rock hyrax running, Ein Gedi

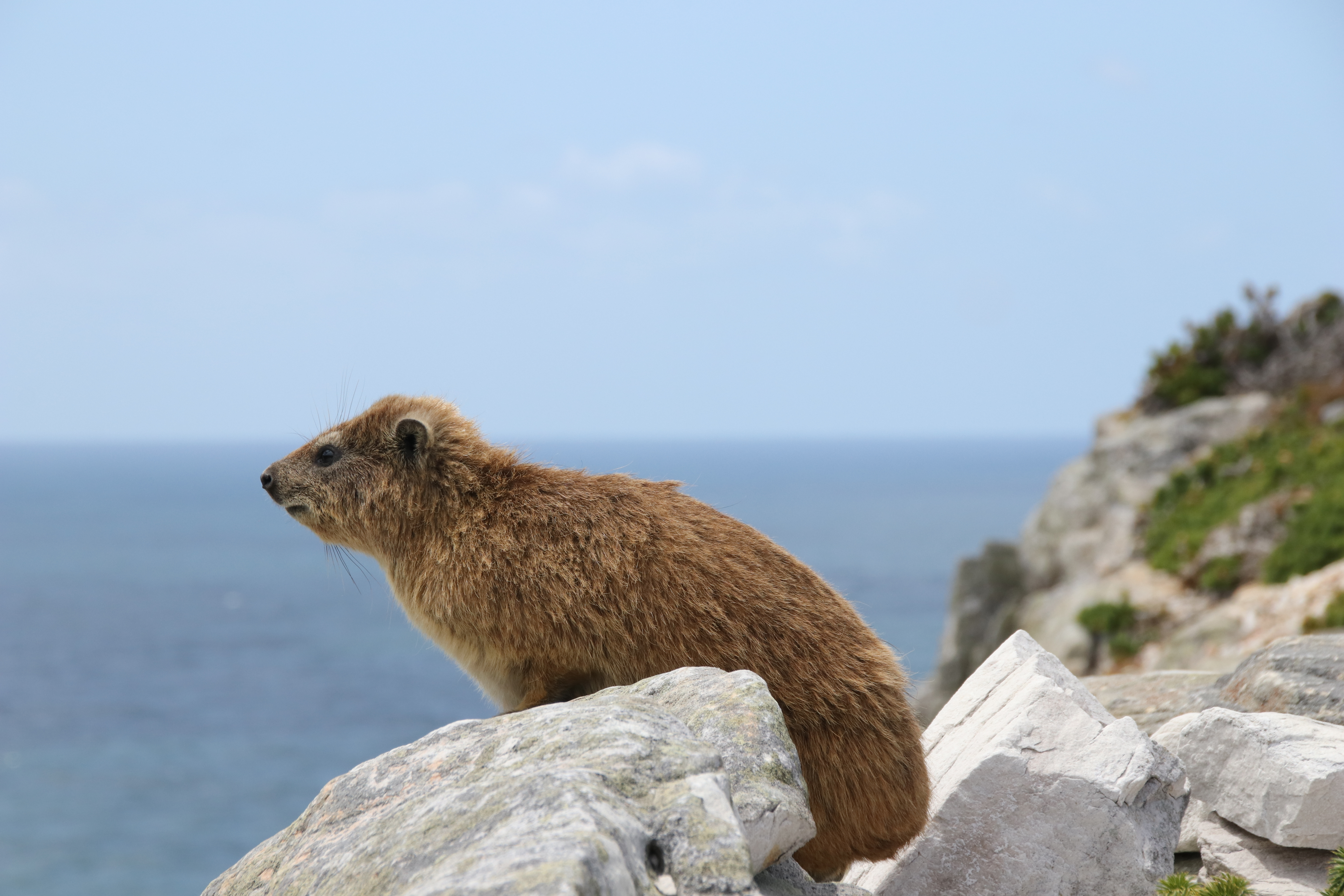
Rock hyrax (dassie) at the Cape of Good Hope, South Africa

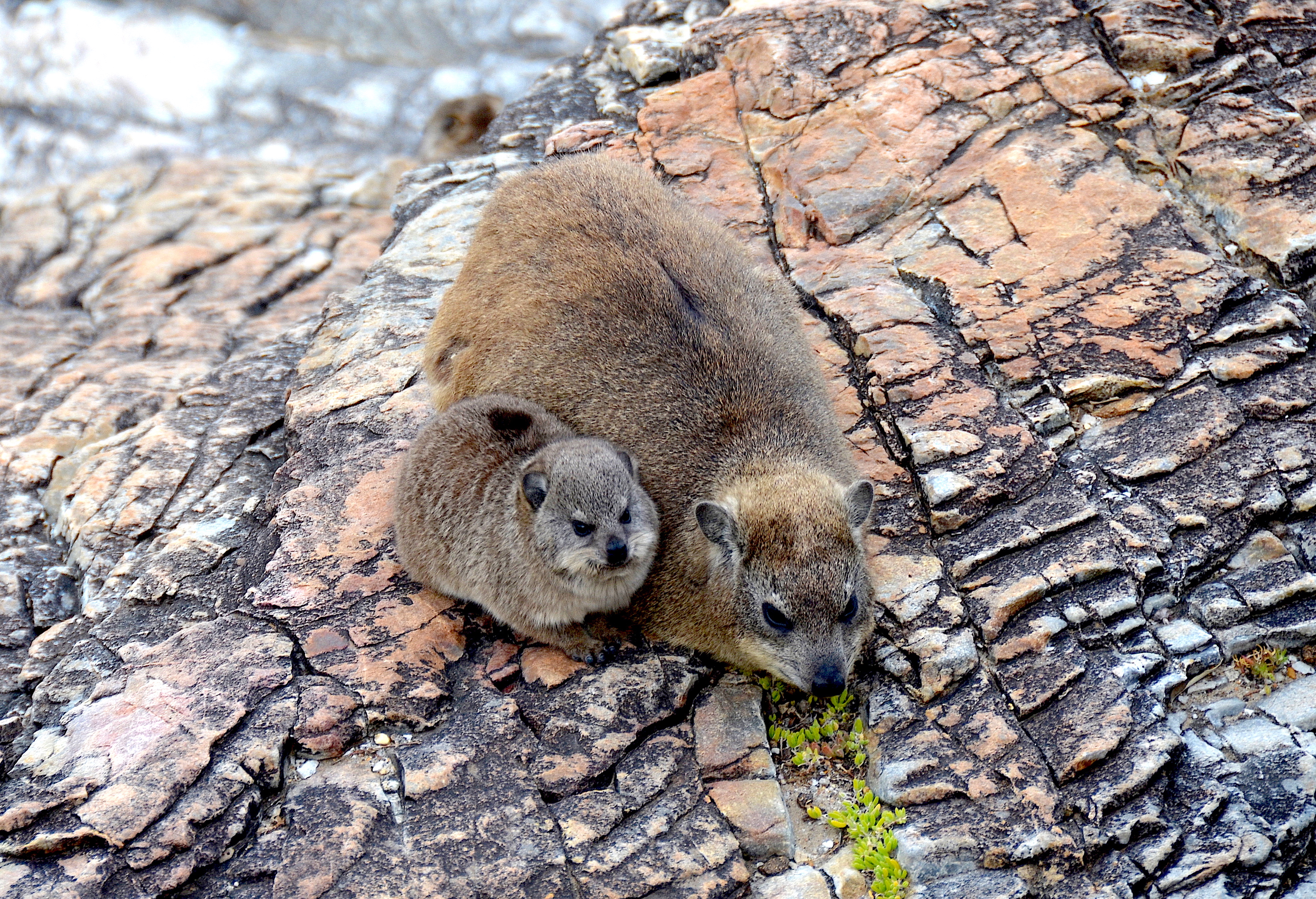
Dassie with young in a coastal setting at Hermanus, South Africa

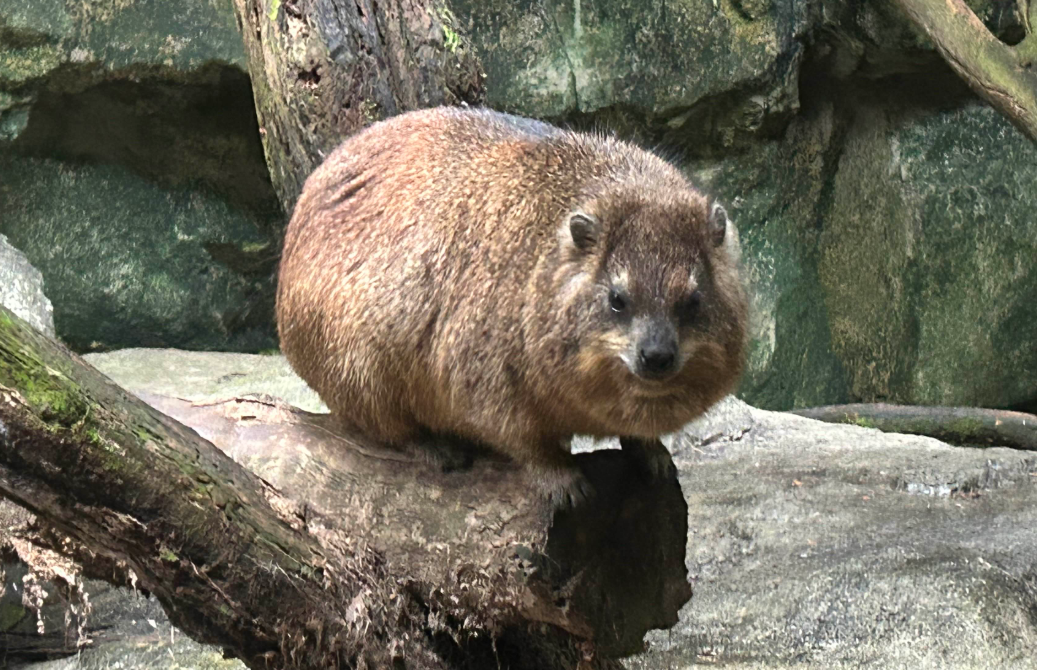
A captive Rock hyrax at Singapore Zoo

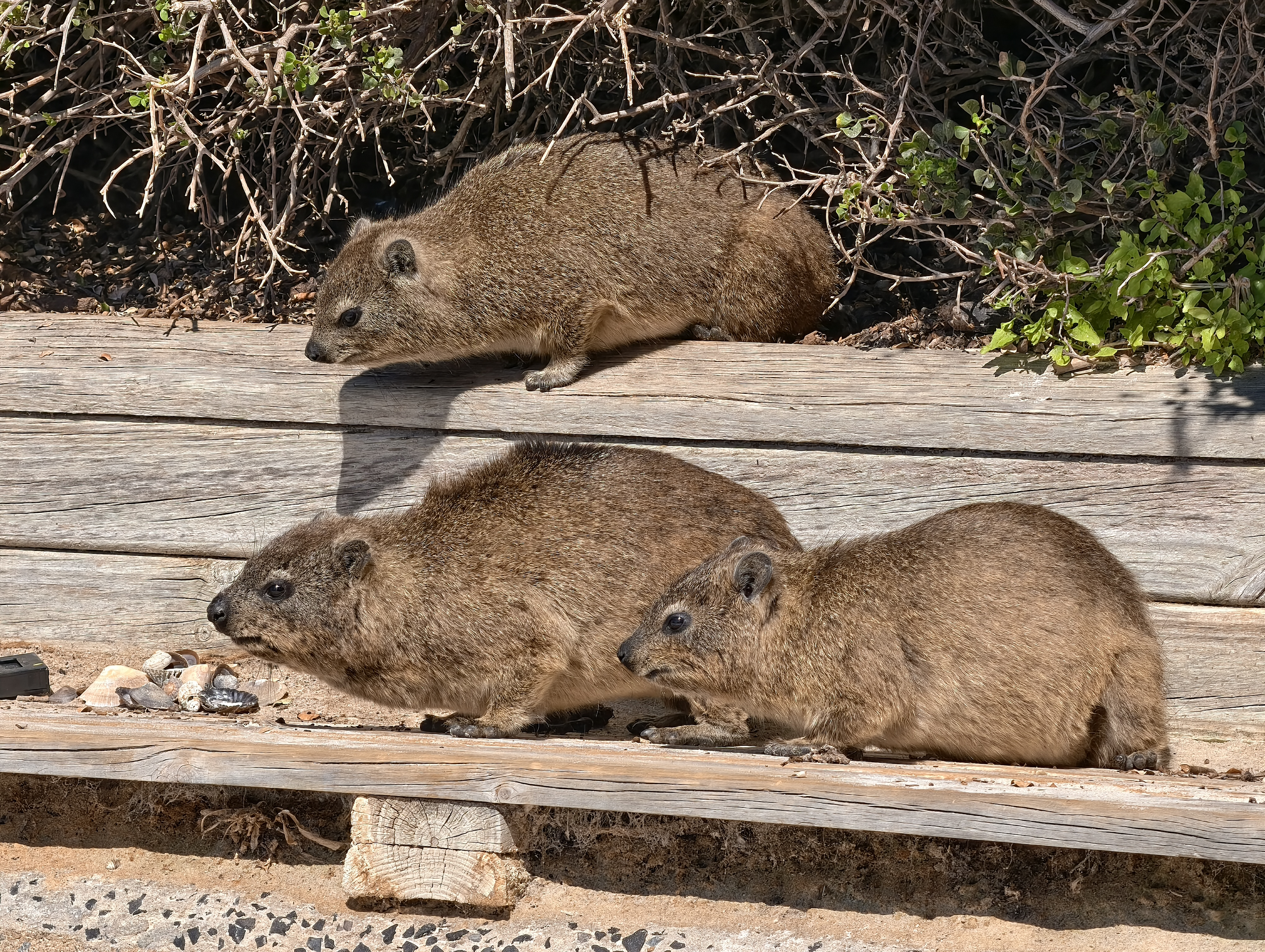
Rock hyraxes at Boulders Beach, Cape Peninsula
