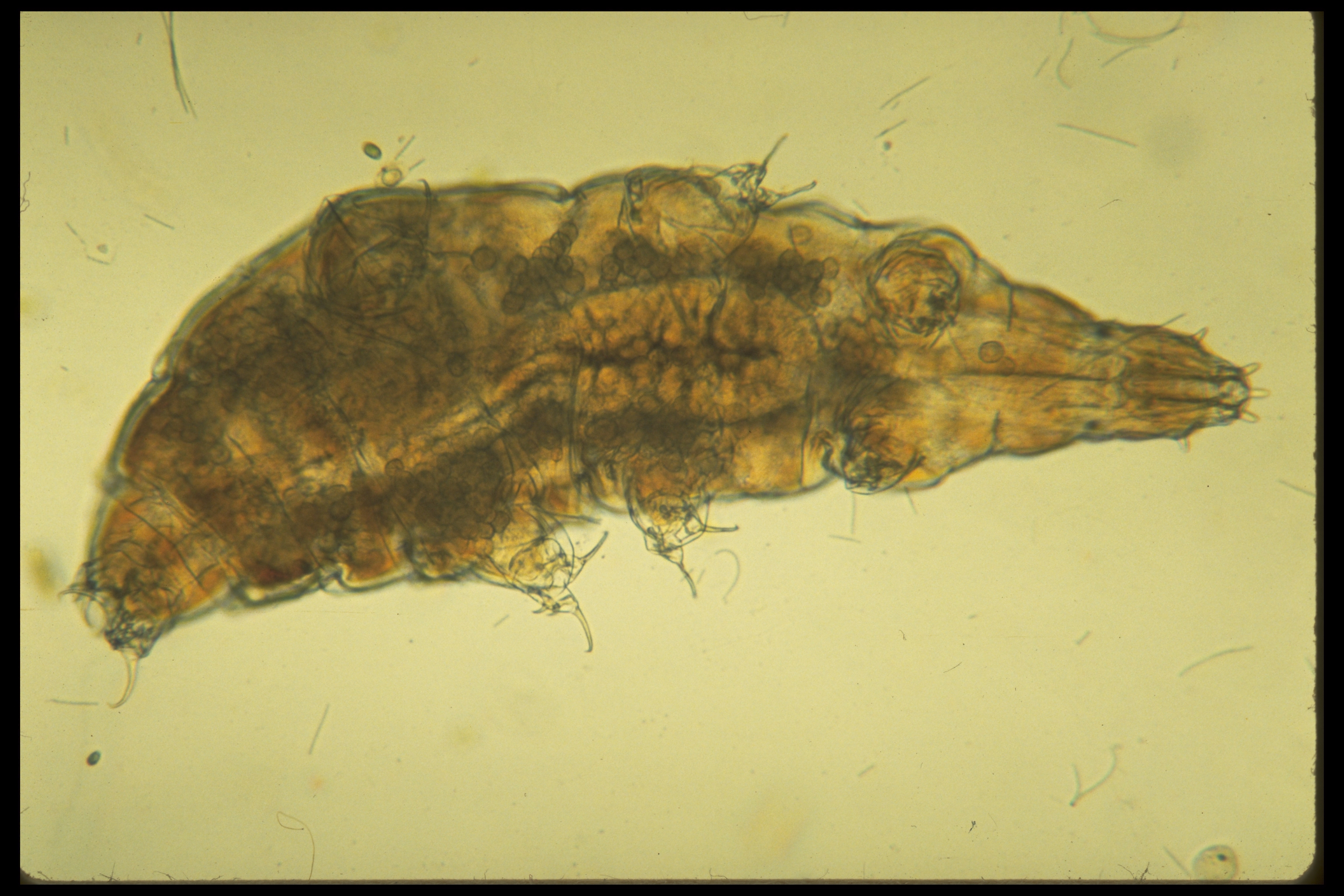
- Microscope image of the closely related species, M. tardigradum

Scientific classification
- Kingdom: Animalia
- Phylum: Tardigrada
- Class: Eutardigrada
- Order: Apochela
- Family: Milnesiidae
- Genus: Milnesium
- Species: M. alpigenum

Binomial name
- Milnesium alpigenum Ehrenberg, 1853

= Milnesium alpigenum =

Species of tardigrade

Milnesium alpigenum is a species of tardigrade that falls under the Tardigrada phylum. Like its taxonomic relatives it is an omnivorous predator that feeds on other small organisms, such as algae, rotifers, and nematodes. M. alpigenum was discovered by Christian Gottfried Ehrenberg in 1853. It is very closely related to Milnesium tardigradum along with many other species from the Milnesium genus.

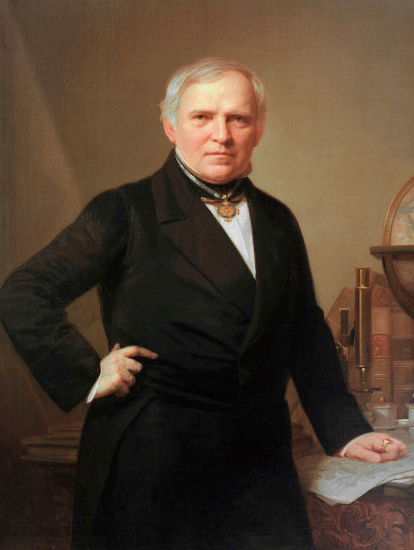
Christian Gottfried Ehrenberg

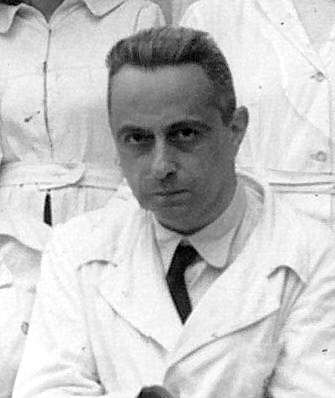
Ernst Marcus in 1943

== History and taxonomy ==
M. alpigenum was first suggested to be an independent species by Christian Gottfried Ehrenberg in 1853. However immediately it was turned down to be a valid species due to its extreme morphological similarity to M. tardigradum (Doyère, 1840). This was also because Intraspecific phenotypic variation was thought to be very large between species of tardigrade, and that each species was vastly physiologically different from one another. However, in the early 20th century more research was conducted in relation to the morphological differences within the Milnesium and other tardigrade genera. It was discovered that any differences between species was very subtle and that all tardigrade were particularly sensitive to reproductive isolating mechanisms.

From 1853 to 1928, M. alpigenum remained Invalid. In 1928 zoologist Ernst Marcus conducted an experiment, synonymizing M. alpigenum along with M. quadrifidum against M. tardigradum. Marcus concluded small morphological differences in claw configuration between the three species, along with statistical morphometry and DNA sequencing differences. These discoveries cemented M. alpigenum as a valid species and its taxonomic status was confirmed. Due to the sympatric nature of the speciation within most of the Milnesium genus, the pre-zygotic isolating factors between M. alpigenum and M. tardigradum are currently unknown. Thus it is predicted that these species do breed, but are unable to produce viable offspring due to post-zygotic factors.

Phylogenetically M. alpigenum branches away from the group of sub species M. inceptum (a close relative). Following that it also branches off its closest relative M. tardigradum. Far prior to this it branches of from the other families of tardigrade like Diploechiniscus or Echiniscus.

== Morphology ==
=== Phylum-specific morphology ===
M. alpigenum has a symmetrical roughly rounded body shape with eight legs. Its method of locomotion is to use its six front legs to propel itself through water and to occasionally use its claws to grip onto substrates. Its hind legs often act as a means to push itself off substrates. However, often the tardigrade will simply drift. Individuals have very varied sizes, but some have been measured up to 0.7 mm in length.

Tardigrades possess extreme resilience to all sorts of negative environmental factors such as: extreme radiation levels, extreme temperatures (both high and low), extreme pressures (both high and low), extreme levels of toxins, and extended periods without food or water (up to 10 years). They manage to counteract these extreme environmental stresses by going into a dormant state called cryptobiosis where their metabolism decreases to approximately 0.01% of its regular levels.

=== Genus-specific morphology ===
There are a very limited amount of unique possible morphological traits within the Milnesium genus with all other traits being common with the greater phylum. The Milnesium specific traits that M. alpigenum possess are as follows: a (3-3)(3-3) claw configuration, the absence of any claw configuration changes as the individual moves to adulthood, a (4+2) peribuccal lamellae body shape, the absence of dorsal cuticle sculpturing, the absence of pseudoplates, a parthenogenesis reproductive mode and (Although not directly morphological) a Palaearctic zoogeographic origin. All of these traits including zoogeographic origin are shared by M. tardigradum, except that M. tardigradum has a (2-3)(3-2) claw configuration and the claw configuration changes as it transitions to adulthood.

== Habitat ==
Milnesium alpigenum are found in the Palaearctic realm (Upper Eurasia). They are found in the same ecological area as M. tardigradum and most other Tardigrada species which is aquatic environments such as marine, coastal and terrestrial areas. In fact, tardigrades are so resilient, populous and varied that an individual will likely consume tens of different species of tardigrade possibly including M. alpigenum in a bottle of spring water.

== Reproduction ==
=== Reproductive method ===
Similarly to almost all tardigrades, Milnesium alpigenum reproduces both sexually and asexually via parthenogenesis, they do this for reasons similar to those of other asexual organisms like Aphids or Sea Stars. They reproduce asexually to take advantage of resource lucrative environments, as well as to take advantage of limited courting opportunities. Whereas they also (like many organisms that asexually reproduce) reproduce sexually in addition. This allows for M. alpigenum to conquer unreliable/unfamiliar environments by increasing genetic diversity giving higher chances for advantageous traits and thus inter-generational survival.

=== Reproductive cycle ===
During sexual reproduction the female lays at most 12 eggs as it sheds it skin, the eggs are then left in the cuticle. Following this, the eggs are then fertilized externally in the cuticle. These take around five to sixteen days to hatch. The hatched larvae undergo various moulting stages that allow them to incrementally reach adulthood. The length of these moulting stages is dependent on the individual's nutrition levels. Finally, once the larvae finish these stages it conducts its final growth moulting phase called ecdysis. After this, the individual has reached reproductive maturity. All tardigrades including M. alpigenum implement the "R" reproductive strategy of having many offspring with little to no investment in growth. The reproductive cycle and nature of M. alpigenum is almost identical to the likes of M. tardigradum.

== Evolutionary connections ==
Where M. alpigenum taxonomically stands was a complex problem that took decades to discover. However where Tardigrades in general stand on the wider tree of life is in itself a mystery. Due to the limited amount of fossil evidence tied to historic specimens of Tardigrades, it is difficult to determine exactly where Tardigrades evolutionarily branch off. Tardigrades have been phylogenetically linked to arthropods and likely has a similar evolutionary history. However, the extent of the relationship is still debated. Other research has shown a shortage in a subset of genes also found in nematodes, another member of the Ecdysozoa superphylum.
