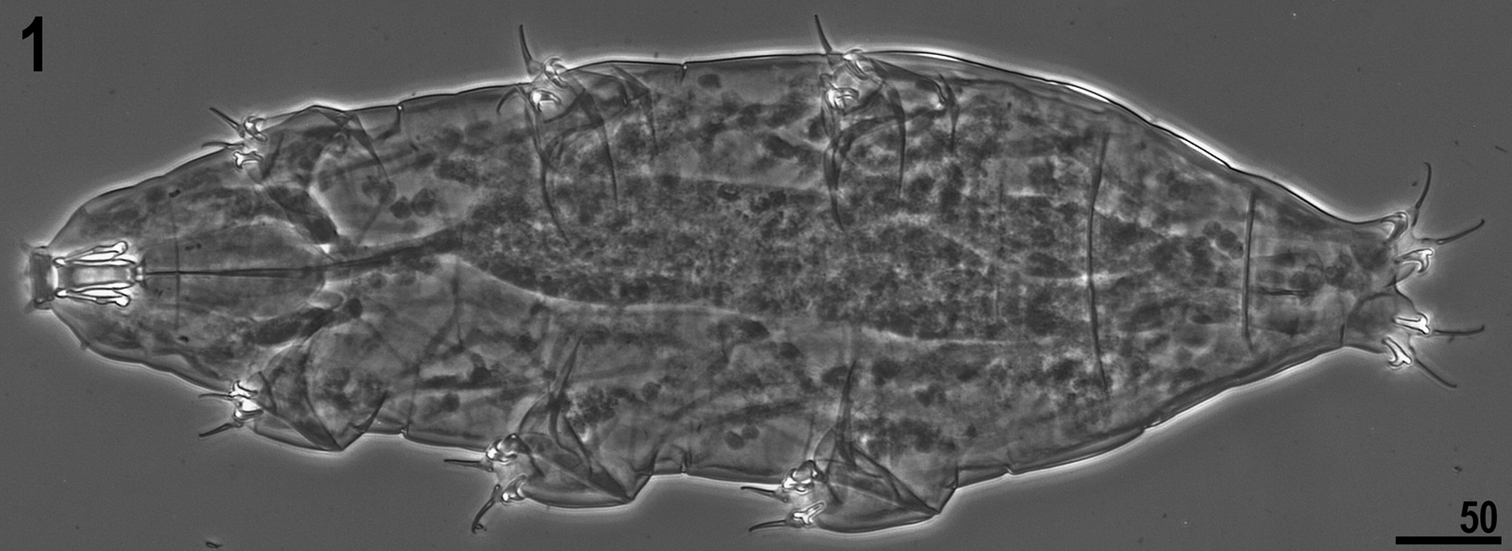
- Ventral view

Scientific classification
- Kingdom: Animalia
- Phylum: Tardigrada
- Class: Eutardigrada
- Order: Apochela
- Family: Milnesiidae
- Genus: Milnesium
- Species: M. berladnicorum

Binomial name
- Milnesium berladnicorum Ciobanu, Zawierucha, Moglan, & Kaczmarek, 2014
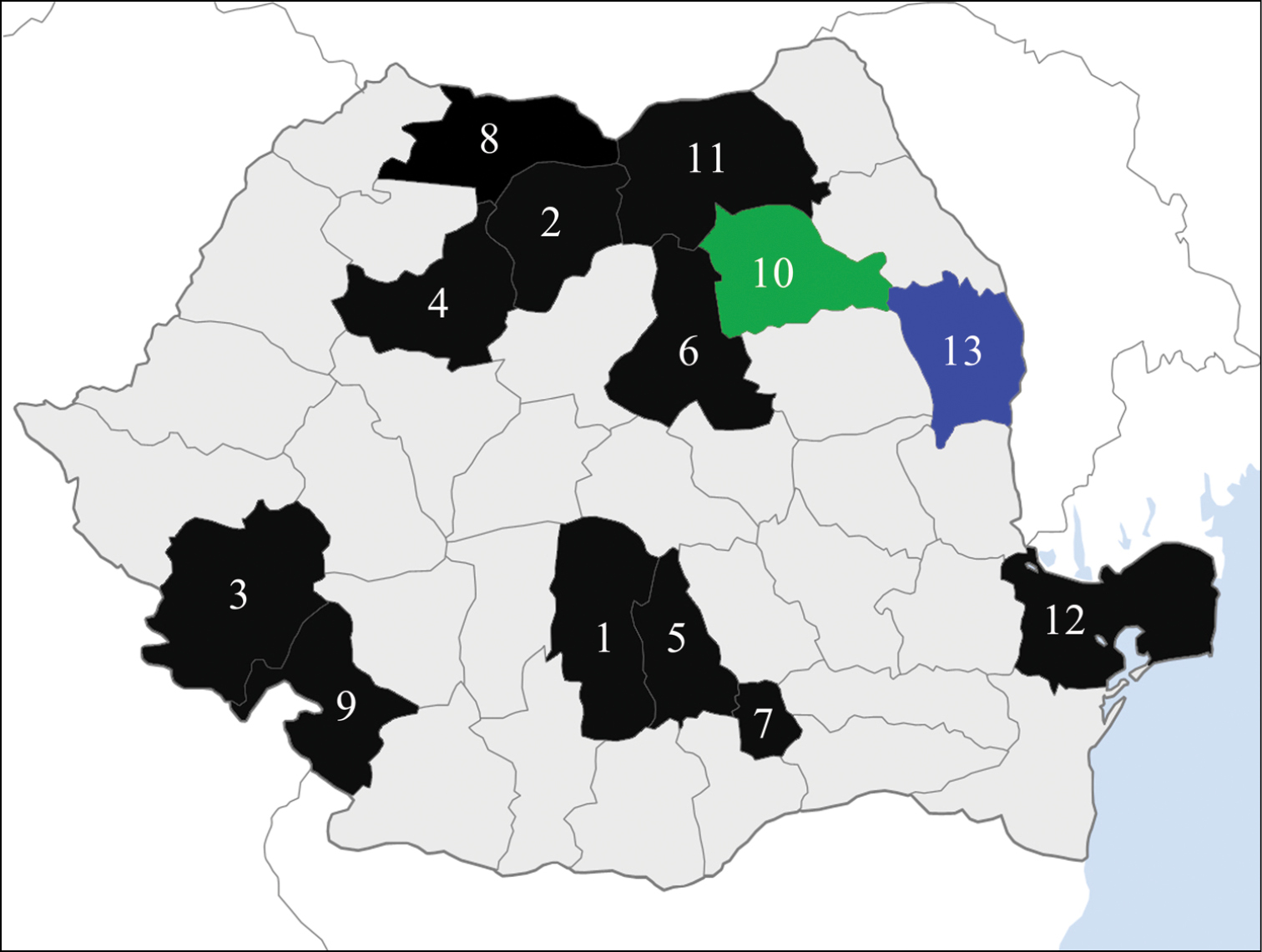
- Range map for M. berladnicorum. Distribution highlighted in green

= Milnesium berladnicorum =

Species of tardigrade

Milnesium berladnicorum is a species of tardigrade in the family Milnesiidae. It was first discovered in Romania in 2013 and formally described in 2014. Like other tardigrades (commonly known as water bears), it is a microscopic, resilient animal with a distinctive appearance characterized by its short, plump body and eight legs.

== Description ==
Milnesium berladnicorum measures between 400 and 734 micrometres in length, with a brownish body that appears transparent when preserved in laboratory samples. About 90% of specimens have visible eyes. The species possesses six peribuccal (around the mouth) papillae, with the ventral papilla being the smallest, and six equally sized peribuccal lamellae surrounding the mouth opening. Two cephalic papillae are positioned laterally on the head.

A distinctive feature of this species is its cuticle (outer covering), which is covered with numerous tiny, shallow, rounded depressions called pseudopores. Under phase contrast microscopy, these pseudopores appear as light spots, placing this species within the "granulatum group" of the genus Milnesium.

The buccal-pharyngeal apparatus (mouth and throat structures) is typical of the genus, with a funnel-shaped buccal tube that is wider at the anterior end. The pharyngeal bulb is elongated and pear-shaped, lacking placoids or septulum (internal structural features found in some tardigrades).

Milnesium berladnicorum has claws of the Milnesium type, which are slender. Primary branches on all legs feature small accessory points at their tips. Secondary claws on all legs have rounded basal thickenings called lunules, though these can be difficult to see in some specimens. Secondary branches of external claws on legs I–III and both posterior and anterior claws on legs IV have two points, while secondary branches of internal claws on legs I–III have three points. This creates a claw configuration described as [2-3]-[2-2] in taxonomic notation, which is unique among species in the granulatum group.

The eggs of M. berladnicorum are smooth and are laid in the shed exuvium (molted outer covering) of the female.

== Habitat and distribution ==
Milnesium berladnicorum was discovered in lichen (Xanthoria parietina) growing on trees in Bârlad town, Vaslui County, Romania. The type locality is situated at coordinates 46°14.74167N, 27°40.27333E, at an elevation of 99 metres above sea level. This species represents one of only three valid Milnesium species confirmed to exist in Romania, alongside M. granulatum and M. asiaticum.

== Taxonomy ==
Milnesium berladnicorum belongs to the phylum Tardigrada, class Eutardigrada, order Apochela, family Milnesiidae, and genus Milnesium. It was first described in 2014 by Daniel Adrian Ciobanu, Krzysztof Zawierucha, Ioan Moglan, and Łukasz Kaczmarek in the journal ZooKeys. The species is named after the Berladnici, an ancient population with a controversial origin (most likely Slavic) who previously inhabited the area of present-day Bârlad town.

Due to its sculptured cuticle, M. berladnicorum belongs to the "granulatum group" within the genus Milnesium. This group consists of eight species characterized by having a cuticle with distinctive surface texture, rather than the smooth cuticle found in the "tardigradum group." M. berladnicorum is most similar to Milnesium beasleyi in terms of dorsal cuticle structure but differs primarily in its claw configuration and certain morphometric characteristics. It can be distinguished from other species in the granulatum group by its unique combination of dorsal sculpture pattern, claw configuration, and specific morphological measurements.
