= Hebesuncus =

Scientific classification
- Domain: Eukaryota
- Kingdom: Animalia
- Phylum: Tardigrada
- Class: Eutardigrada
- Order: Parachela
- Family: Hypsibiidae
- Genus: Hebesuncus; Pilato, 1987

Species
- see text

Genus of tardigrades

Hebesuncus is a genus of water bear or moss piglet, a tardigrade in the class Eutardigrada.

== Species ==
- Hebesuncus conjungens (Thulin 1911)
- Hebesuncus ryani Dastych and Harris, 1994
- Hebesuncus schusteri (Dastych, 1984)
- Hebesuncus mollispinus (Pilato McInnes & Lisi 2012)
