= Thulinius =

Scientific classification
- Kingdom: Animalia
- Phylum: Tardigrada
- Class: Eutardigrada
- Order: Parachela
- Family: Hypsibiidae
- Genus: Thulinius; Bertolani, 2003

Species
- see text

Genus of tardigrades

Thulinius is a genus of water bear or moss piglet, a tardigrade in the class Eutardigrada.

== Species ==
Thulinius contains the following species:

- Thulinius augusti (Murray, 1907)
- Thulinius gustavi Massa, Guidetti, Cesari, Rebecchi & Jönsson, 2021
- Thulinius itoi (Tsurusaki, 1980)
- Thulinius romanoi Bertolani, Bartels, Guidetti, Cesari & Nelson, 2014
- Thulinius ruffoi (Bertolani, 1981)
- Thulinius saltursus (Schuster, Toftner & Grigarick, 1978)
- Thulinius stephaniae (Pilato, 1974)
