= Pseudobiotus =

Scientific classification
- Kingdom: Animalia
- Phylum: Tardigrada
- Class: Eutardigrada
- Order: Parachela
- Family: Hypsibiidae
- Genus: Pseudobiotus; Nelson, 1980

Species
- See text

Genus of tardigrades

Pseudobiotus is a genus of water bear or moss piglet, a tardigrade in the class Eutardigrada.

== Species ==
Pseudobiotus contains the following species:

- Pseudobiotus hirsutellus Pilato, Lisi & Binda, 2010
- Pseudobiotus kathmanae Nelson, Marley and Bertolani, 1999
- Pseudobiotus longiunguis (Iharos, 1968)
- Pseudobiotus matici (Pilato, 1971)
- Pseudobiotus megalonyx (Thulin, 1928)
- Pseudobiotus vladimiri Biserov, Dudichev and Biserova, 2001
