= Félix Dujardin =

French biologist

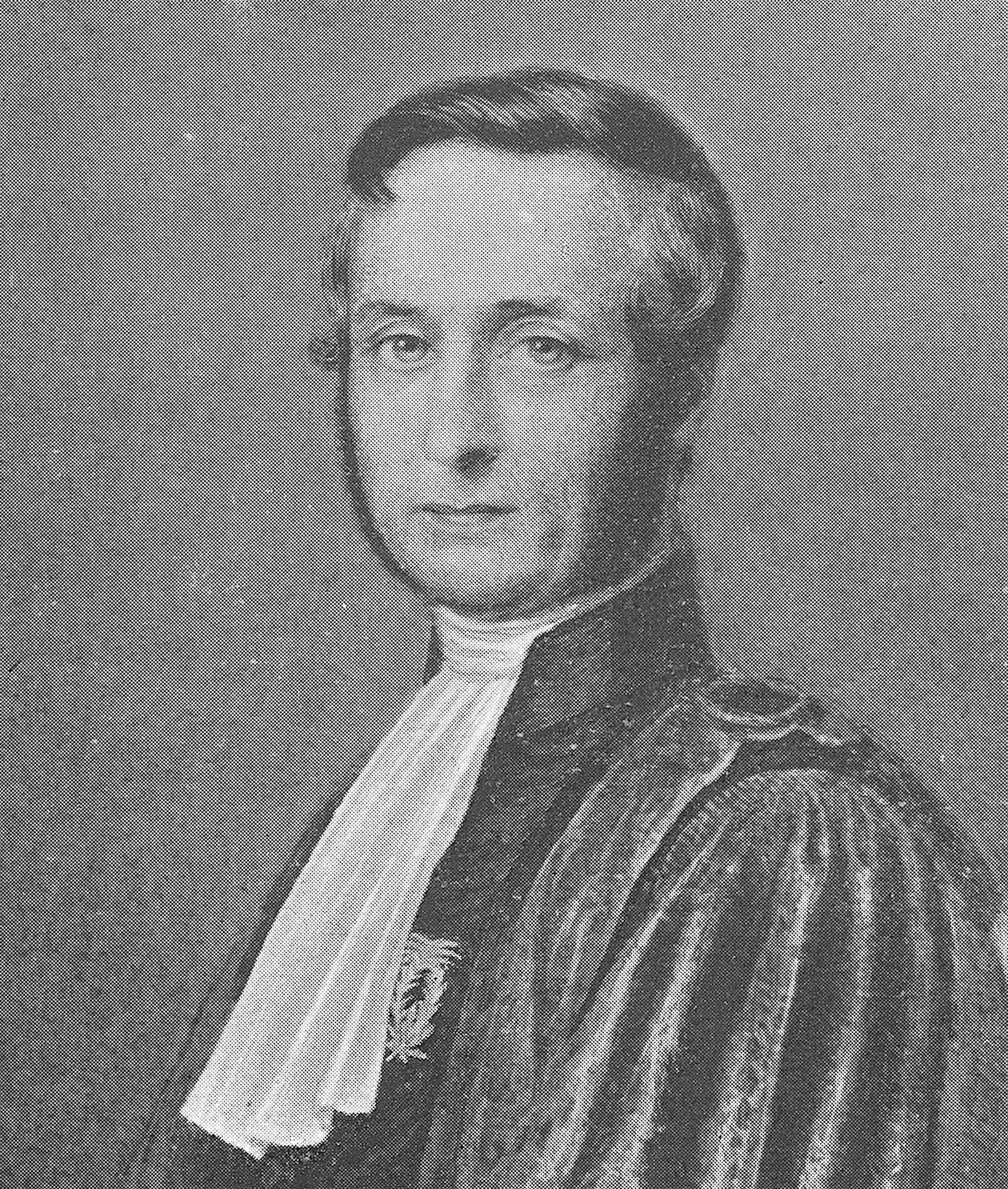
- Painting by his daughter, 1847
- Born: 5 April 1801; Tours, France
- Died: 8 April 1860 (aged 59); Rennes, France
- Known for: protozoans, helminths
- Scientific career
- Fields: Biology, Parasitology
- Workplaces: University of Rennes, France
- Author abbrev. (botany): Dujard.

Signature
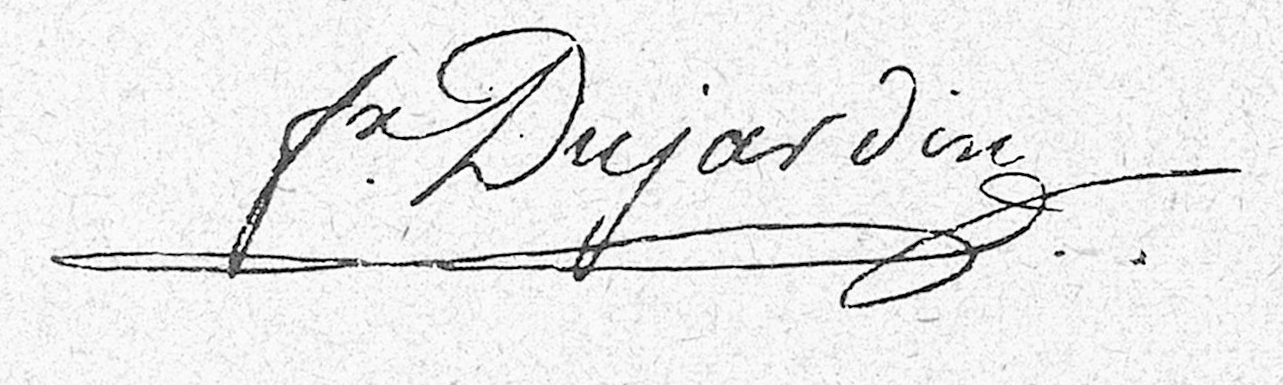

Félix Dujardin (5 April 1801 – 8 April 1860) was a French biologist born in Tours. He is remembered for his research on protozoans and other invertebrates.

== Biography ==
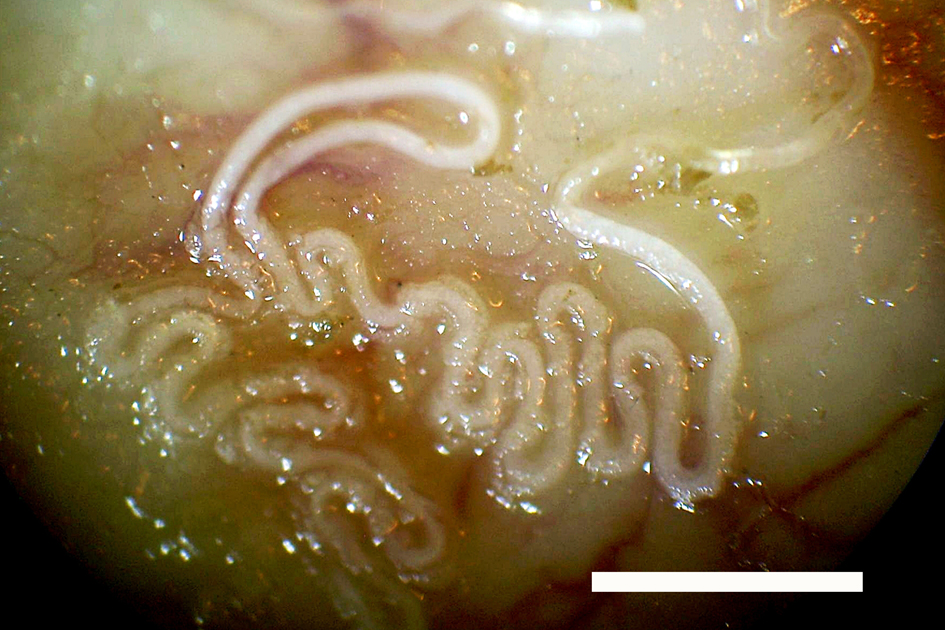
Eucoleus aerophilus (Creplin, 1839) Dujardin, 1845 (Nematoda), one of the parasites he studied

In 1840 Dujardin was appointed professor of geology and mineralogy at the University of Toulouse, and during the following year was a professor of zoology and botany at Rennes. In regard to his educational background, Dujardin was largely self-taught, the son of a watchmaker.

Dujardin worked with microscopic animal life, and in 1834 proposed that a new group of one-celled organisms be called Rhizopoda. He denied naturalist Christian Gottfried Ehrenberg's theory that microscopic organisms were "complete organisms" similar to higher animals, specifically noting that they had specialized structures unique to single-celled organisms, which meant that the foraminiferan he was studying was not, as his contemporaries believed it to be, a mollusc. In addition to his studies of microscopic life, he did extensive research on invertebrate groups that included echinoderms, hexapods, helminths and cnidarians.

In the Foraminifera, he noticed an apparently formless life substance that he named "sarcode", later renamed protoplasm by Hugo von Mohl (1805–1872).

Dujardin remains famous for the naming, identification and the first description in 1850 of the mushroom bodies (corpora pedunculata) in the hymenopteran brain (bee, bumblebee, sphex, ant, fruitfly Drosophila melanogaster, etc.), which he postulated for the first time were the site of intelligence - he wrote that bees have "memories of places and things". This major discovery proved to be significant, as these structures are now considered the place where memory and many other behaviors are formed and processed in invertebrates. He suggested that one sign of honey bees' intelligence was their communication about flower locations, seventy-seven years before Karl von Frisch's 'waggle dance' theory was published. In addition, he valued the importance of brain-to-body-mass ratio and the relative sizes of brain parts to the whole instead of comparing absolute sizes, over a century before it became current thinking.

== Honours and distinctions ==
In 1840, Louis Michel François Doyère named the tardigrade Macrobiotus dujardini in his honour.

Knight of the Order of Legion of Honour

== Bibliography ==
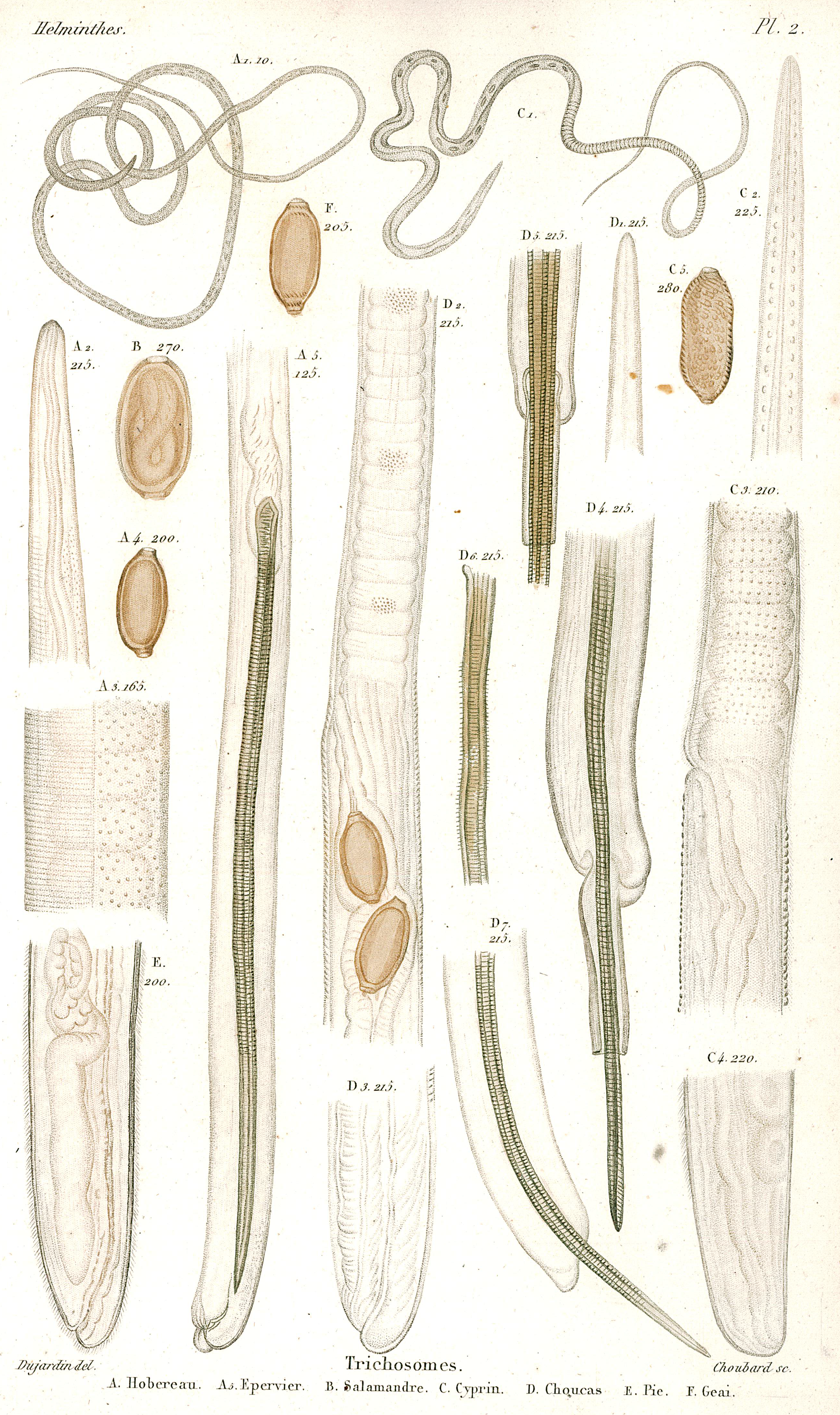
A plate from Histoire naturelle des helminthes ou vers intestinaux

- Dujardin F. 1837. Mémoire sur les couches du sol en Touraine et descriptions des coquilles de la craie des faluns.
- Dujardin F. 1841. Histoire naturelle des zoophytes. Infusoires, comprenant la physiologie et la classification de ces animaux, et la manière de les étudier à l'aide du microscope.
- Dujardin F. 1842. Nouveau manuel de l'observateur au microscope.
- Dujardin F. 1845. Histoire naturelle des helminthes ou vers intestinaux. xvi, 654+15 pp. + Plates.
- Dujardin F. 1850. Mémoire sur le système nerveux des insectes. Ann. Sci. Nat. Zool. 14: 195-206.

== External sources ==
- Félix Dujardin @ Encyclopædia Britannica Online
- article on Felix Dujardin's Contributions to Protistology
