= Eremobiotus =

- Eremobiotus alicatai

Scientific classification
- Kingdom: Animalia
- Phylum: Tardigrada
- Class: Eutardigrada
- Order: Parachela
- Family: Isohypsibiidae
- Genus: Eremobiotus; Biserov, 1992

Species
- see text

Genus of tardigrades

Eremobiotus is a genus of tardigrade in the class Eutardigrada.

== Species ==
Eremobiotus contains the following species:

- Eremobiotus alicatai (Binda 1969)
- Eremobiotus ginevrae Lisi, Binda & Pilato, 2016
- Eremobiotus ovezovae Biserov, 1992
