= Milnesium reductum =

Scientific classification
- Domain: Eukaryota
- Kingdom: Animalia
- Phylum: Tardigrada
- Class: Eutardigrada
- Order: Apochela
- Family: Milnesiidae
- Genus: Milnesium
- Species: M. reductum

Binomial name
- Milnesium reductum Tumanov, 2006

Species of tardigrade

Milnesium reductum is a species of Eutardigrades discovered by zoologist Denis. V. Tumanov in 2006. This species of Tardigrade is part of the family Milnesiidae. This species differs from its cogenerate species mainly by proportions of its claws and buccopharyngeal apparatus.
