= Richtersius =

Scientific classification
- Kingdom: Animalia
- Phylum: Tardigrada
- Class: Eutardigrada
- Order: Parachela
- Family: Richtersiidae
- Genus: Richtersius; Pilato & Binda, 1989

Type species
- Macrobiotus coronifer Richters, 1903

Genus of tardigrades

Richtersius is a monospecific genus of tardigrades in the family Richtersiusidae; its sole species is Richtersius coronifer. R. coronifer is one of two species of tardigrade that have been shown to survive and continue reproducing after exposure to outer space, specifically in the thermosphere at 258–281 km above sea level with ionizing solar and galactic cosmic radiation for 10 days. However, unlike Milnesium tardigradum, R. coronifer did not survive under these conditions plus UV exposure.
