= Milnesium lagniappe =

Scientific classification
- Domain: Eukaryota
- Kingdom: Animalia
- Phylum: Tardigrada
- Class: Eutardigrada
- Order: Apochela
- Family: Milnesiidae
- Genus: Milnesium
- Species: M. lagniappe

Binomial name
- Milnesium lagniappe Meyer, Hinton & Dupré, 2013

Species of tardigrade

Milnesium lagniappe is a species of Eutardigrade in the family Milnesiidae. It is found in the southeastern United States, where it grows on lichens and plant litter. This microscopic creature belongs to the Milnesium granulatum species complex and is characterised by its claw formula (a notation used to describe the number and arrangement of points on the claws of a tardigrade's legs), distinct cuticle features and stout claws with well-developed accessory points (additional, smaller points or projections found on the claw).

== Taxonomy ==
Milnesium lagniappe was discovered in Louisiana and Florida, USA. The species was scientifically described by Harry Meyer, Juliana Hinton, and Maria Dupré in 2013. The name lagniappe (pronounced lán-yap), derived from Louisiana French, means an "unexpected benefit". The holotype and 18 paratypes (15 female, 3 male) are deposited in the W.A.K. Seale Museum at McNeese State University in Louisiana.

== Description ==
The female Milnesium lagniappe has a white or transparent body, with nine dorsal and lateral transverse bands featuring a reticulated pattern of irregular polygons. The cuticle lacks gibbosities (small, rounded projections or swellings on the cuticle) and has a smooth surface. The buccal apparatus (mouthparts) is of the Milnesium type, with a cylindrical buccal tube (a cylindrical structure within the buccal apparatus that houses the stylets, needle-like structures used for piercing plant cells or small invertebrates to consume their contents.). The pharyngeal bulb (a muscular, sac-like structure found in the pharynx) is elongated, pear-shaped, and without placoid (a small, plate-like structure) or septulum (a thin, membranous partition).

The claws are stout, with well-developed accessory points (additional, smaller points or projections found on the claw, usually near the base of the primary claw branch), and the claw configuration is [2-3]-[3-2] (indicating that the external and posterior secondary claws have two points, while the internal and anterior secondary claws have three points). The primary claw branches and claw base with secondary branches are stout, with round basal thickenings. The external and posterior secondary claws have two points, while the internal and anterior secondary claws have three points. The first three pairs of legs have thick, transverse (crosswise) structures known as cuticular bars.

Males have proportionately larger secondary claws in legs 1 and 2 than females. They differ from other Milnesium species by having only four peribuccal lamellae (thin, plate-like structures surrounding the mouth), visible with phase contrast microscopy, whereas most species have six.

== Habitat and distribution ==
Milnesium lagniappe has been found in various locations in Louisiana and Florida, USA. The tardigrades have been collected from fruticose and foliose lichens on trees, deciduous leaf litter at the base of Liquidambar styraciflua, and moss on Pinus species. In some instances, Milnesium lagniappe was found in the same samples as an undescribed Milnesium species with a different claw configuration. The publication of M. lagniappe increased the number of documented tardigrade species in Louisiana and Florida to 20 and 21, respectively.

== Relationship with other species ==
The Milnesium lagniappe water bear species is a member of the granulatum group, which is characterised by sculptured (reticulated) cuticles. It shares some characteristics with M. reticulatum and M. tetralamellatum, but can be distinguished by its unique cuticle features, size, claw proportions and buccal tube width.
