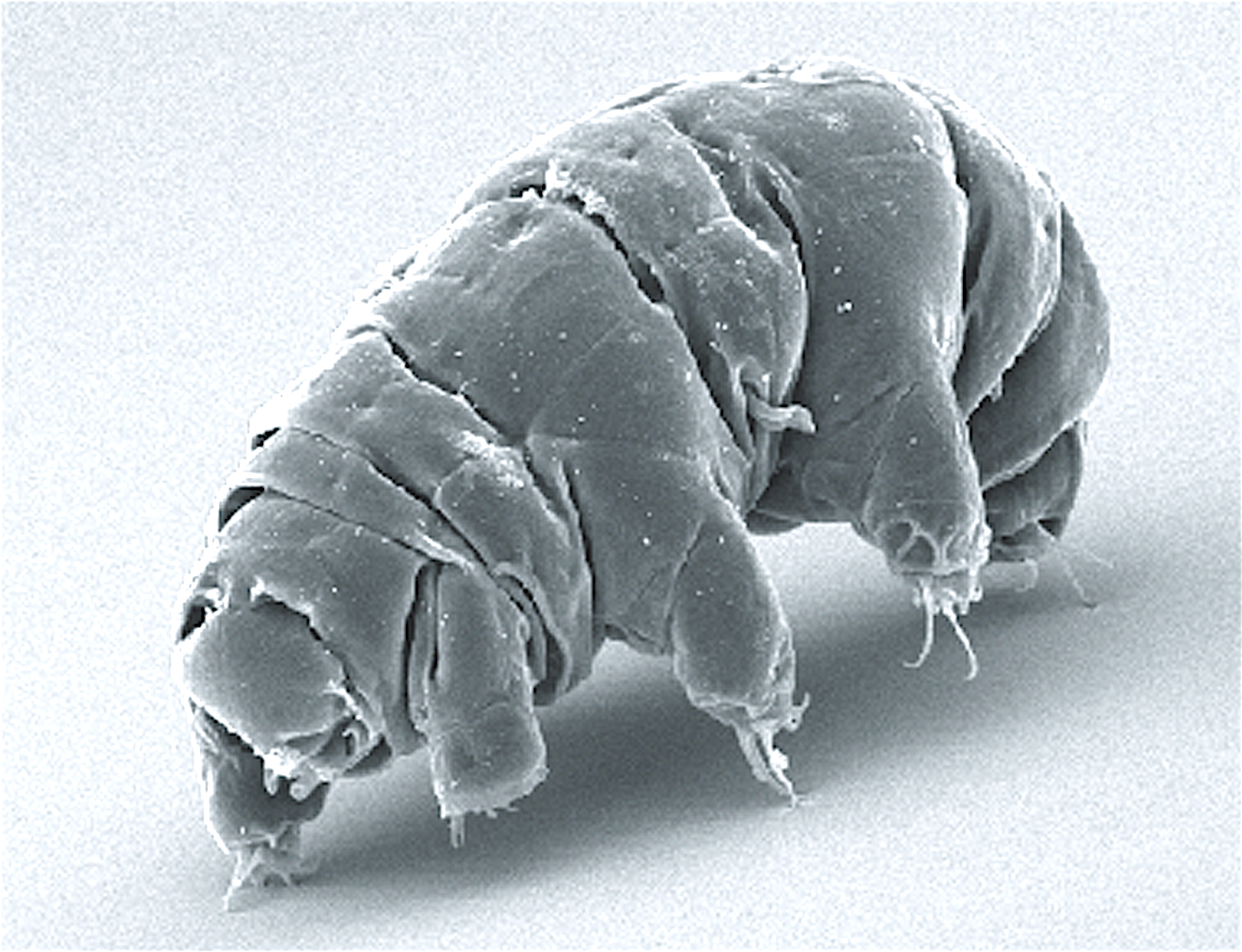
- SEM image of Milnesium tardigradum

Scientific classification
- Kingdom: Animalia
- Phylum: Tardigrada
- Class: Eutardigrada
- Order: Apochela
- Family: Milnesiidae
- Genus: Milnesium; Doyère, 1840

= Milnesium =

Milnesium Temporal range: Turonian–Recent

Genus of tardigrades

Milnesium, also known as Milnesium Doyère, 1840 (named after Louis Michel François Doyère), is a genus of tardigrades. Milnesium exhibits tardigrade species with multi-legged, multi-clawed, and segmented morphology. Species of Milnesium are common with the most known, M. tardigradum, being found in a wide variety of habitats across the world. Milnesium has a fossil record extending back to the Cretaceous with the oldest species found being known from Turonian stage deposits on the east coast of the United States.

== Anatomy ==
=== External morphology ===
Milnesium species of tardigrades are segmented, eight-legged, clawed, microfauna. As a genus in Eutardigrada, they are considered large in body size. Their bodily covering exhibit varying and distinct structure and textures between species. Their claws are made up of posterior and anterior primary and secondary claws with primary claws being long and slender and secondary claws being short and not as slender. Like other tardigrades, they can enter into a state of cryptobiosis and utilize intrinsically disordered proteins when experiencing extreme environments.

=== Buccopharyngeal apparatus ===
Milnesium species have one of two unique valvular systems part of the bucco-pharyngeal apparatus that assist with feeding. Type 1 is characterized with the pharyngeal bulb and buccal tube flaps opening outwards like an umbrella and Type 2 exhibits the pharyngeal bulb and buccal tube flaps opening inwards towards the pharynx and the lumen.

== Distribution ==
Milnesium, like most tardigrades, are ecologically diverse and can be observed in varying habitats and climates. Various species have been found in Paleartic and Pantropical realms. Generally, they have limited dispersion ability which is observed as species being geographically clustered among a continent or geographic subregion. The limited dispersion is likely due to their relatively large size when "tun" or from there reproductive strategy depositing eggs in their cuticle; making them heavy and not as dispersible via wind. Observed geographic clustering is hypothesized from the limited dispersion ability in tandem with original geographic locations of the populations before and during the separation of the Gondwana supercontinent in the past.

== Species ==
Described species include:

- Milnesium alabamae Wallendorf & Miller, 2009
- Milnesium almatyense Tumanov, 2006
- Milnesium alpigenum Ehrenberg, 1853
- Milnesium antarcticum Tumanov, 2006
- Milnesium argentinum Roszkowska, Ostrowska & Kaczmarek, 2015
- Milnesium asiaticum Tumanov, 2006
- Milnesium barbadosense Meyer & Hinton, 2012
- Milnesium beasleyi Kaczmarek, Jakubowska & Michalczyk, 2012
- Milnesium beatae Roszkowska, Ostrowska & Kaczmarek, 2015
- Milnesium berladnicorum Ciobanu, Zawierucha, Moglan & Kaczmarek, 2014
- Milnesium bohleberi Bartels, Nelson, Kaczmarek & Michalczyk, 2014
- Milnesium brachyungue Binda & Pilato, 1990
- Milnesium cassandrae Moreno-Talamantes, Roszkowska, García-Aranda, Flores-Maldonado & Kaczmarek, 2019
- Milnesium burgessi Schlabach, Donaldson, Hobelman, Miller & Lowman, 2018
- Milnesium dornensis Ciobanu, Roszkowska & Kaczmarek, 2015
- Milnesium dujiangensis Yang, 2003
- Milnesium eurystomum Maucci, 1991
- Milnesium fridae Moreno-Talamantes, León-Espinosa, García-Aranda, Flores-Maldonado & Kaczmarek, 2020
- Milnesium granulatum Ramazzotti, 1962
- Milnesium jacobi Meyer & Hinton, 2010
- Milnesium katarzynae Kaczmarek, Michalczyk & Beasley, 2004
- Milnesium kogui Londoño, Daza, Caicedo, Quiroga & Kaczmarek, 2015
- Milnesium krzysztofi Kaczmarek & Michalczyk, 2007
- Milnesium lagniappe Meyer, Hinton & Dupré, 2013
- Milnesium longiungue Tumanov, 2006
- Milnesium minutum Pilato & Lisi, 2016
- Milnesium quadrifidum Nederström, 1919
- Milnesium rastrum Suzuki, Sugiura, Tsujimoto, and McInnes, 2023
- Milnesium reductum Tumanov, 2006
- Milnesium reticulatum Pilato, Binda & Lisi, 2002
- Milnesium sandrae Pilato & Lisi, 2016
- Milnesium shilohae Meyer, 2015
- Milnesium swansoni Young, Chappell, Miller & Lowman, 2016
- † Milnesium swolenskyi Bertolani & Grimaldi, 2000
- Milnesium tardigradum Doyère, 1840
- Milnesium tetralamellatum Pilato & Binda, 1991
- Milnesium tumanovi Pilato, Sabella & Lisi, 2016
- Milnesium validum Pilato, Sabella, D'Urso & Lisi, 2017
- Milnesium variefidum Morek, Gąsiorek, Stec, Blagden & Michalczyk, 2016
- Milnesium vorax Pilato, Sabella & Lisi, 2016
- Milnesium zsalakoae Meyer & Hinton, 2010
