= Milnesium asiaticum =

Scientific classification
- Kingdom: Animalia
- Phylum: Tardigrada
- Class: Eutardigrada
- Order: Apochela
- Family: Milnesiidae
- Genus: Milnesium
- Species: M. asiaticum

Binomial name
- Milnesium asiaticum Tumanov, 2006

Species of tardigrade

Milnesium asiaticum is a species of Eutardigrades in the family Milnesiidae. This species differs from its cogenerate species mainly by proportions of its claws and buccopharyngeal apparatus.
