= Bergtrollus =

Scientific classification
- Kingdom: Animalia
- Phylum: Tardigrada
- Class: Eutardigrada
- Order: Apochela
- Family: Milnesiidae
- Genus: Bergtrollus; Dastych, 2011
- Species: B. dzimbowski

Binomial name
- Bergtrollus dzimbowski Dastych, 2011

Genus of tardigrades

Bergtrollus is a genus of tardigrades with one species, Bergtrollus dzimbowski.

The genus name Bergtrollus is named after the mythical Scandinavian "mountain troll" (berg meaning "mountain" in Norwegian, German, etc.). The species name is in honor of Hans-Jochen Dzimbowski, a friend and guide of the discoverer of the species, Hieronymus Dastych.
