= Streptomyces radiopugnans =

Scientific classification
- Domain: Bacteria
- Kingdom: Bacillati
- Phylum: Actinomycetota
- Class: Actinomycetes
- Order: Streptomycetales
- Family: Streptomycetaceae
- Genus: Streptomyces
- Species: S. radiopugnans

Binomial name
- Streptomyces radiopugnans Mao et al. 2007

Type strain
- CGMCC 4.3519, DSM 41901, JCM 15480, R-97

Species of bacterium

Streptomyces radiopugnans is a halotolerant and radiation resistant bacterium species from the genus of Streptomyces which has been isolated from radiation polluted soil from the Xinjiang Province in China.

== See also ==
- List of Streptomyces species
