= Radioresistance =

Level of ionizing radiation that organisms are able to withstand

Radioresistance is the level of ionizing radiation that organisms are able to withstand.

Ionizing-radiation-resistant organisms (IRRO) were defined as organisms for which the dose of acute ionizing radiation (IR) required to achieve 90% reduction (D10) is greater than 1,000 gray (Gy)

Radioresistance is surprisingly high in many organisms, in contrast to previously held views. For example, the study of environment, animals and plants around the Chernobyl disaster area has revealed an unexpected survival of many species, despite the high radiation levels. A Brazilian study in a hill in the state of Minas Gerais which has high natural radiation levels from uranium deposits, has also shown many radioresistant insects, worms and plants. Certain extremophiles, such as the bacteria Deinococcus radiodurans and the tardigrades, can withstand large doses of ionizing radiation on the order of 5,000 Gy.

== Induced radioresistance ==
This is a graph showing the effect of fractionation on the ability of gamma rays to cause cell death. The blue line is for cells which were not given a chance to recover while the red line is for cells which were allowed to stand for a time and recover.

In the graph on left, a dose/survival curve for a hypothetical group of cells has been drawn with and without a rest time for the cells to recover. Other than the recovery time partway through the irradiation, the cells would have been treated identically.

Radioresistance may be induced by exposure to small doses of ionizing radiation. Several studies have documented this effect in yeast, bacteria, protozoa, algae, plants, insects, as well as in in vitro mammalian and human cells and in animal models. Several cellular radioprotection mechanisms may be involved, such as alterations in the levels of some cytoplasmic and nuclear proteins and increased gene expression, DNA repair and other processes. Also biophysical models presented general basics for this phenomenon.

Many organisms have been found to possess a self-repair mechanism that can be activated by exposure to radiation in some cases. Two examples of this self-repair process in humans are described below.

Devair Alves Ferreira received a large dose (7.0 Gy) during the Goiânia accident, and lived, whereas his wife, who got a dose of 5.7 Gy, died. The most likely explanation is that his dose was fractionated into many smaller doses which were absorbed over a length of time while his wife stayed in the house more and was subjected to continuous irradiation without a break so giving the self repair mechanisms in her body less time to repair some of the damage done by the radiation. This resulted in her death. He also eventually died in 1994. In the same way some of the persons who worked in the basement of the wrecked Chernobyl have built up doses of 10 Gy, these workers received these doses in small fractions so the acute effects were avoided.

It has been found in radiation biology experiments that if a group of cells are irradiated then as the dose increases the number of cells which survive decrease. It has also been found that if a population of cells are given a dose before being set aside (without being irradiated) for a length of time before being irradiated again then the radiation has less of an ability to cause cell death. For many short term radiation deaths (3 days to 30 days) the loss of cells forming blood cells (bone marrow) and the cells in the digestive system (wall of the intestines) cause death.

== Inheritance of radioresistance ==
There is strong evidence that radioresistance can be genetically determined and inherited, at least in some organisms. Heinrich Nöthel, a geneticist from the Freie Universität Berlin carried out the most extensive study about radioresistance mutations using the common fruit fly, Drosophila melanogaster, in a series of 14 publications.

== Evolution of radioresistance ==
From the perspective of evolutionary history and causation, radioresistance does not appear to be an adaptive trait because there is no documented naturally occurring selection pressure that could have bestowed a fitness advantage to the ability for organisms to withstand doses of ionizing radiation in the range that several extremophile species have been observed to be capable of surviving. This is primarily because the Earth's magnetic field shields all its inhabitants from solar cosmic radiation and galactic cosmic rays, which are the two primary sources of ionizing radiation across the Solar System, and even including all documented terrestrial sources of ionizing radiation such as radon gas and primordial radionuclides at geographical locations considered to be natural high-level radiation sites, the yearly dose of natural background radiation remains tens of thousands of times smaller than the levels of ionizing radiation that many highly radioresistant organisms can withstand.

One possible explanation for the existence of radioresistance is that it is an example of co-opted adaptation or exaptation, where radioresistance could be an indirect consequence of the evolution of a different, linked adaptation that has been positively selected for by evolution. For example, the desiccation-adaptation hypothesis proposes that the extreme temperatures present in the habitats of hyperthermophiles like Deinococcus radiodurans cause cellular damage that is virtually identical to damage typically caused by ionizing radiation, and that the cellular repair mechanisms that have evolved to repair this heat or desiccation damage are generalizable to radiation damage as well, allowing D. radiodurans to survive extreme doses of ionizing radiation. Exposure to gamma radiation leads to cellular DNA damage including alterations in nitrogenous base-pairing, sugar-phosphate backbone damage, and double-stranded DNA lesions. The extraordinarily efficient cellular repair mechanisms that Deinococcus species like D. radiodurans have evolved to repair heat-damage are likely also capable of reversing the effects of DNA damage wrought by ionizing radiation, such as by piecing back together any components of their genome that have been fragmented by the radiation.

Bacillus sp. producing unusually radiation (and peroxide) resistant spores, have been isolated from spacecraft assembly facilities, and are thought of as candidates that could ride piggyback on spacecraft through interplanetary transfer. Genome analysis of some of these radiation resistant spore producers have thrown some light on the genetic traits that could be responsible for the resistances observed.

In general, radioresistance in prokaryotes is achieved by two cellular mechanisms. The first is protection of the proteome and DNA from ionizing radiation induced damage. The second is recruitment of highly sophisticated DNA repair mechanisms that enable the reconstruction of a fully functional genome. These DNA repair mechanisms include homologous recombinational repair, and extended synthesis-dependent strand annealing.

The fungus Cladosporium sphaerospermum is a unique radiophile which has over the decades reached the inner rooms of the Chernobyl nuclear power plant; it has also been shown to thrive on the International Space Station in the presence of cosmic rays. Utilizing ionizing radiation as it does for biological energy (a unique property), it is the subject of intensive research.

== Radioresistance in radiation oncology ==
Radioresistance is also a term sometimes used in medicine (oncology) for cancer cells which are difficult to treat with radiotherapy. Radioresistance of cancer cells may be intrinsic or induced by the radiation therapy itself.

== Radioresistance comparison ==
The comparison in the table below is only meant to give approximate indications of radioresistance for different species and should be taken with great caution. There are generally big differences in radioresistance for one species among experiments, due to the way radiation affects living tissues and to different experimental conditions. We should for example consider that because radiation impedes cell division, immature organisms are less resistant to radiations than adults, and adults are sterilized at doses much lower than that necessary to kill them. For example, for the insect parasitoid Habrobracon hebetor, the LD_{50} for haploid embryo during cleavage (1–3 hours of age) is 200 R, but about 4 hours later it is of 7,000 R (for X-ray intensity of 110 R/minute), and haploid (= male) embryos are more resistant than diploid (= female) embryos. The mortality of adults H. hebetor exposed to a dose of 180,250 R is the same to this of a non-irradiated control group (food was not provided to either groups) (for 6,000 R/minute). However, a lower dose of 102,000 R (for 6,000 R/minute) is sufficient to induce a state of lethargy in H. hebetor that is manifested by a complete cessation of activity, including cessation of feeding, and these individuals eventually let themselves starve to death. And an even lower dose of 4,858 R (for 2,650 R/minute) is sufficient to sterilize adult female H. hebetor (sterility arises 3 days post-exposure). Other important factors that influence the level of radioresistance include: The length of time during which a dose of radiation is delivered—with doses delivered during longer periods, or at time intervals, being associated with greatly reduced negative effects; The feeding state of individuals—with pre-fed and post-fed individuals being more resistant to radiations compared to starved individuals; The type of radiation used (e.g., tardigrades Milnesium tardigradum irradiated with heavy ions have a higher survival than when irradiated with gamma rays, for a same irradiation dose); The physiological state of individuals (e.g., the tardigrade species Richtersius coronifer and Milnesium tardigradum are more resistant to gamma-ray radiation when in the hydrated state, and Macrobiotus areolatus is more resistant to X-ray radiation when in the anhydrobiotic state). The way lethality is measured is also source of variation for the estimated radioresistance of a species. Irradiated specimens are not instantly killed, unless exposed to a very high dose (acute dose). Therefore, irradiated specimens die over a certain period of time and lower irradiation doses correspond to longer survival. This means that the radiation dose LD_{50} fluctuates with the time at which it is measured. For example, the β radiation dose that causes 50% mortality in the American cockroach at 25 days post-exposure is 5,700 R, but to reach 50% mortality at 3 days post-exposure, 45,610 R are needed. 25 days can represent a long survival period for short lived species, such as insects, but would represent a very short survival time for long lived species, such as mammals, so comparing survival of different species after the same amount of time post-exposure also poses some challenges of interpretation. These examples illustrate the many issues associated with comparison of radioresistance among species and the need for caution when doing so.

Lethal radiation doses (Gray)
Organism	Lethal dose	LD_{50}	LD_{100}	Group
Dog		3.5 (LD_{50/30 days})		Mammals
Human	4–10	4.5	10	Mammals
Rat		7.5		Mammals
Mouse	4.5–12	8.6–9		Mammals
Rabbit		8 (LD_{50/30 days})		Mammals
Tortoise		15 (LD_{50/30 days})		Reptile
Goldfish		20 (LD_{50/30 days})		Fish
Escherichia coli	60		60	Bacteria
German cockroach		64		Insects
Shellfish		200 (LD_{50/30 days})		-
Common fruit fly	640			Insects
C. elegans^{∗}		160-200	≫ 500-800	Nematode
Amoeba		1,000 (LD_{50/30 days})		-
Habrobracon hebetor	1,800			Insects
Milnesium tardigradum	5,000			Eutardigrade
Deinococcus radiodurans	15,000			Bacteria
Thermococcus gammatolerans	30,000			Archaea

∗ While an LD_{50} has been reported for wild type C. elegans individuals, an upper lethal limit has not been established, rather "nearly all animals were alive with no indication of excess lethality up to 800 Gy, the highest dose... measured."

== See also ==
- Ex-Rad a radioprotective drug studied for its ability to protect against acute radiation syndrome
- CBLB502 a similar radioprotective drug, that protects against acute radiation syndrome, during radiotherapy.
- Radiosensitivity
- Background radiation
- Radiation hormesis
- Radiotrophic fungus
- Kojic acid
