= Limmenius =

Scientific classification
- Domain: Eukaryota
- Kingdom: Animalia
- Phylum: Tardigrada
- Class: Eutardigrada
- Order: Apochela
- Family: Milnesiidae
- Genus: Limmenius; Horning, Schuster and Grigarick, 1978
- Species: L. porcellus

Binomial name
- Limmenius porcellus Horning, Schuster & Grigarick, 1978

Genus of tardigrades

Limmenius is a genus of tardigrades with one species, Limmenius porcellus.
