= Microhypsibiidae =

Scientific classification
- Domain: Eukaryota
- Kingdom: Animalia
- Phylum: Tardigrada
- Class: Eutardigrada
- Order: Parachela
- Family: Microhypsibiidae; Pilato, 1998

Genera
- see text

Family of tardigrades

Microhypsibiidae is a family of tardigrades in the class Eutardigrada. It contains the following species in two genera:

- Fractonotus
  - Fractonotus caelatus (Marcus 1928)
- Microhypsibius
  - Microhypsibius bertolanii Kristensen, 1982
  - Microhypsibius japonicus Ito, 1991
  - Microhypsibius minimus Kristensen, 1982
  - Microhypsibius truncatus Thulin, 1928
