= Necopinatidae =

Scientific classification
- Domain: Eukaryota
- Kingdom: Animalia
- Phylum: Tardigrada
- Class: Eutardigrada
- Order: Parachela
- Family: Necopinatidae; Ramazzotti and Maucci, 1983

Genera
- see text

Family of tardigrades

Necopinatidae is a family of water bears or moss piglets, tardigrades in the class Eutardigrada. It contains the following species in two genera

- Apodibius
  - Apodibius confusus Dastych, 1983
  - Apodibius nuntius Binda, 1986
  - Apodibius richardi Vargha, 1995
  - Apodibius serventyi Morgan & Nicholls 1986
- Necopinatum
  - Necopinatum mirabile Pilato, 1971
