= Richtersiusidae =

Scientific classification
- Kingdom: Animalia
- Phylum: Tardigrada
- Class: Eutardigrada
- Order: Parachela
- Superfamily: Macrobiotoidea
- Family: Richtersiusidae; Guidetti, Schill, Giovannini, Massa, Goldoni, Ebel, Förschler, Rebecchi & Cesari, 2021

Synonyms
- Richtersiidae Guidetti, Rebecchi, Bertolani, Jönsson, Kristensen & Cesari, 2016

Family of tardigrades

Richtersiusidae is a family of tardigrades belonging to the order Parachela.

Genera:

- Adorybiotus Maucci & Ramazzotti, 1981
- Diaforobiotus Guidetti, Rebecchi, Bertolani, Jönsson, Kristensen & Cesari, 2016
- Richtersius Pilato & Binda, 1989
