= Halobiotus =

Scientific classification
- Kingdom: Animalia
- Phylum: Tardigrada
- Class: Eutardigrada
- Order: Parachela
- Family: Hypsibiidae
- Genus: Halobiotus; Kristensen, 1982

Species
- see text

Genus of tardigrades

Halobiotus is a genus of tardigrade in the class Eutardigrada.

== Species ==
Halobiotus contains the following species:

- Halobiotus arcturulius Crisp and Kristensen, 1983
- Halobiotus crispae Kristensen, 1982
- Halobiotus stenostomus (Richters, 1908)
