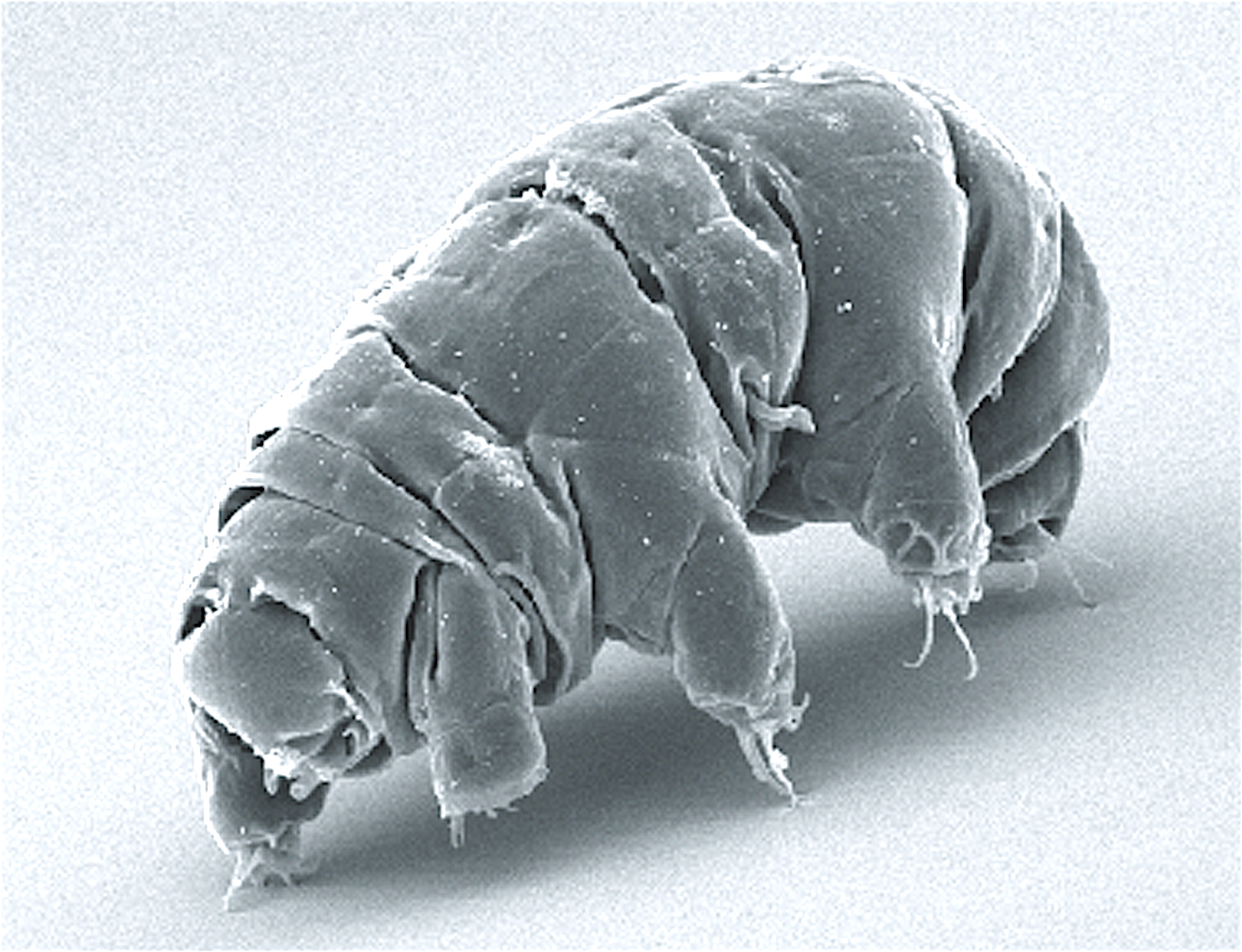
- SEM image of Milnesium tardigradum

Scientific classification
- Kingdom: Animalia
- Phylum: Tardigrada
- Class: Eutardigrada
- Order: Apochela
- Family: Milnesiidae
- Genus: Milnesium
- Species: M. tardigradum

Binomial name
- Milnesium tardigradum Doyère, 1840

= Milnesium tardigradum =

Species of tardigrade

Milnesium tardigradum is a cosmopolitan species of tardigrade that can be found in a diverse range of environments. It has also been found in the sea around Antarctica. M. tardigradum was described by Louis Michel François Doyère in 1840. It contains unidentified osmolytes that could potentially provide important information in the process of cryptobiosis.

== Description ==
=== Morphology ===
M. tardigradum has a symmetrical body with eight legs; it uses claws—a distinctive feature of this tardigrade species. The total length of the body varies, with some measuring up to 0.7 mm in length.

M. tardigradum have been found to possess a high level of radioresistance. In 2007, individuals of two tardigrade species, Richtersius coronifer and M. tardigradum, were subject to the radiation, near-vacuum, and near-absolute zero conditions of outer space as part of the European Space Agency's Biopan-6 experiment. Three specimens of M. tardigradum survived. The M. tardigradum can cope with high amounts of environmental stress by initiating cryptobiosis. During this state, the internal organic clock of M. tardigradum halts, thus the cryptobiotic state does not contribute to the aging process.

=== Nutrition ===
M. tardigradum is an omnivorous predator. It typically feeds on other small organisms, such as algae, rotifers, and nematodes. There have also been recorded cases of M. tardigradum feeding on other smaller tardigrades.

== Evolution ==
Milnesium tardigradum has been phylogenetically linked to arthropods. Although the extent of the relationship is still debated, evidence suggests that tardigrades and arthropods have a close evolutionary history. A 2017 study has shown a shortage in a particular subset of genes also found in nematodes, another member of the Ecdysozoa superphylum.

== Habitat ==
The biogeographical distribution of M. tardigradum is large. The species occupies mostly aquatic environments such as marine, coastal, and terrestrial areas. The full distribution of M. tardigradum is difficult to analyze due to the difficulty in taxonomy and the lack of sufficient data.

== Reproduction and development ==
M. tardigradum reproduces both sexually and through parthenogenesis. The mating behavior of tardigrades is difficult to reproduce under artificial conditions; hence the frequency and time of reproduction is not fully understood. If and when a mating season exists for M. tardigradum is unknown.

Females lay up to 12 eggs, which hatch after several days (around five to sixteen). The development of newly hatched larvae is marked by various molting stages, rather than metamorphosis. The time frame of these molting stages vary from each tardigrade as it is dependent on the nutrition of the specific individual. Once the molting stages are complete, the larva tardigrade attempts to find an ideal location to initiate ecdysis. Some eggs may be left in the discarded exuvia. Tardigrades have been shown to respond to different temperature changes at different developmental stages. Specifically, the younger the egg, the less likely it is to survive extreme environments. However, not too long after development, tardigrades demonstrate a remarkable ability to withstand these conditions. To survive such conditions, tardigrades need time to develop important cellular structures and repair mechanisms.

== In popular culture ==
M. tardigradum was voted the winner of The Guardian's "2025 invertebrate of the year" competition, from a shortlist of ten. The article describing the conclusion of the contest stated that the species had "endured all five previous planetary extinction events".
