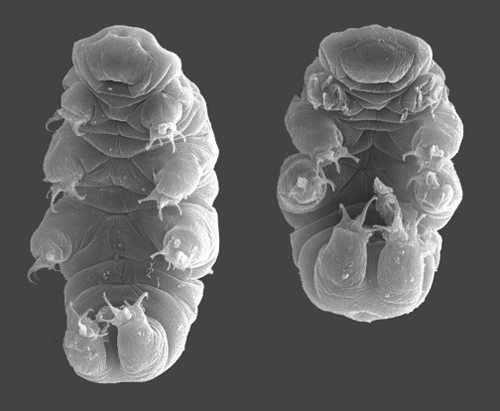

Scientific classification
- Kingdom: Animalia
- Phylum: Tardigrada
- Class: Eutardigrada
- Order: Parachela
- Family: Hypsibiidae
- Genus: Hypsibius
- Species: H. dujardini

Binomial name
- Hypsibius dujardini (Doyère, 1840)

Synonyms
- Macrobiotus dujardini Doyère, 1840

= Hypsibius dujardini =

Species of tardigrade

Hypsibius dujardini sensu lato is a species complex of tardigrade in the class Eutardigrada. A member of this complex, Hypsibius exemplaris, is widely used for various research projects pertaining to evolutionary biology and astrobiology. The species was described by Louis Michel François Doyère in 1840 (as Macrobiotus dujardini).

H. exemplaris was differentiated from H. dujardini sensu stricto in 2018. Earlier studies refer to this lab species from northwest England as H. dujardini. H. dujardini s.s. is found in France, and has differences in 18S rRNA sequence and morphological details.

== Habitat ==
The species, Hypsibius dujardini, is a tardigrade that prefers freshwater lakes, rivers, and streams. Because they are considered cosmopolitan, their geographical range is immense. They can be found in regions like the tropics and the poles.

== Genome sequencing ==
The genome of Hypsibius exemplaris has been sequenced. Hypsibius exemplaris has a compact genome and a generation time of about two weeks. It can be cultured indefinitely and cryopreserved.

== Protection of DNA ==
Hypsibius exemplaris contains an ortholog of the nuclear protein termed Dsup for damage suppression. Dsup binds to nucleosomes and protects chromatin DNA from hydroxyl radicals that could be generated by ionizing radiation or by hydrogen peroxide.
