= Hartmut Greven =

German zoologist

Hartmut Greven (born 25. November 1942 in Neustadt in Oberschlesien) is a German zoologist.

== Life ==
After studying biology, Hartmut Greven received his doctorate in 1971 at the University of Münster with a thesis on faunistic-ecological and functional-morphological studies on native tardigrades, where he completed his post-doctoral habilitation in 1978 with a thesis entitled "Contributions to the reproductive biology of the genus Salamandra (Amphibia, Urodela)". After working at the Medical Faculty of the University of Münster and acting professorships at Paderborn and Düsseldorf, he became Professor of Zoomorphology at the former Institute for Zoomorphology, Cell Biology and Parasitology at the Heinrich Heine University Düsseldorf until his retirement.

Greven is co-editor of scientific journals (1988 to 2016 Acta Biologica Benrodis (ISBN 978-3-936616-83-5); since 1991 Zeitschrift für Fischkunde now Bulletin of Fish Biology (ISSN 1867-5417); since 2004 Entomologie heute (ISSN 1613-0448)). He is head of the Editorial Board of the German Society for Ichthyology, and he was president of that society until 2013. He has published numerous works on animal groups along with review articles and popular science essays.

== Works ==
- Die Bärtierchen. Tardigrada (= Die Neue Brehm-Bücherei vol. 537). Ziemsen, Wittenberg 1980, DNB 810426749.
- Tardigrada. In: J. Bereiter-Hahn, A. G. Matoltsy, K. S. Richards (ed.): Biology of the Integument. vol. I, Springer Verlag, Berlin 1984, ISBN 3-540-13062-4, pp. 714–727.
- Der Feuersalamander. Das Fabeltier und das Objekt moderner zoologischer Forschung. In: Lurchi – dem Feuersalamander auf der Spur. Ausstellungskatalog der Galerie der Stadt Kornwestheim 1994, DNB 94491408X, pp. 145–155.
- mit Manfred Klinkhardt und Michael Tesche: Database of fish chromosomes. Westarp Wissenschaften, Magdeburg 1995, ISBN 3-89432-089-3.
- Survey of the oviduct of salamandrids with special reference to the viviparous species. In: Journal of Experimental Zoology vol. 282, 1998, pp. 507–525.
- Oviduct and egg jelly. In: D. M. Sever (ed.): Reproductive Biology and Phylogeny of Urodela (Amphibia). Science Publishers, Enfield, New Hampshire 2003, ISBN 1-57808-285-4, pp. 151–181.
- Larviparity and pueriparity. In: D. M. Sever (ed.): Reproductive Biology and Phylogeny of Urodela (Amphibia). Science Publishers, Enfield, New Hampshire 2003, S. 447–475.
- Structural and behavioural traits associated with sperm transfer in Poeciliinae. In: M.C. Uribe, H. Grier (ed.): Viviparous fishes. New Life Publications, Homestead, Florida 2005, ISBN 0-9645058-5-1, pp. 147–165.
- Maternal adaptations to reproductive modes in amphibians. In: Hormones and Reproduction of Vertebrates. Vol. 2: D. O. Norris, K. H. Lopez (ed.): Amphibians. Academic Press, New York 2010, ISBN 978-0-12-374931-4, pp. 117–141.
- What do we know about reproduction of internally fertilizing halfbeaks (Zenarchopteridae)? In: Mari Carmen Uribe, Harry J. Grier (ed.): Viviparous Fishes. Band II, New Life Publications, Homestead, Florida 2010, pp. 121–142.
- Gonads, genitals and reproductive biology. In: J. Evans, A. Pilastro, I. Schlupp (eds.): Biology and Evolution of Poeciliids. Chicago Press, Chicago 2011, ISBN 978-0-226-22274-5, pp. 3–17.
- From Johann August Ephraim Goeze to Ernst Marcus – A Ramble through the History of Early Tardigrade Research (1773 until 1929). In: R. Schill (ed.): Water Bears – the Biology of Tardigrades. Springer Nature Switzerland, 2019, ISBN 978-3-319-95701-2, pp. 1–55.
- as editor with Rüdiger Riehl: Fortpflanzungsbiologie der Aquarienfische. Band 1–2. Schmettkamp, Bornheim 1995–1999, ISBN 3-928819-08-9 (vol. 1), ISBN 3-928819-10-0 (vol. 2).
- as editor with Rüdiger Riehl: Biologie der Aquarienfische. Tetra, Münster 2006, ISBN 3-89745-186-7.
