= Ferdinand Richters =

German zoologist

Ferdinand Richters (1 May 1849, Hamburg – 3 July 1914) was a German zoologist. Richters was the curator of Crustacea at the Naturmuseum Senckenberg from 1878 until his death in 1914.

He studied sciences at the Universities of Göttingen and Heidelberg, receiving his doctorate in 1873 with a thesis on phyllosoma. As a student he had as instructors Friedrich Wöhler, Gustav Kirchhoff and Robert Bunsen. In 1873/74 he worked as an assistant in the zoological institute at Göttingen, afterwards relocating to Frankfurt am Main, where he found employment at the Senckenberg Institute. In 1886, he was named vice-director of the Senckenberg Gesellschaft für Naturforschung, where three years later, he was appointed first director.

While on a scientific excursion to the Taunus Mountains in 1900, he developed an interest in tardigrades, subsequently publishing numerous papers on the phylum. He is credited with the discovery of many tardigrade species, including a number from the genus Diphascon.

== Partial bibliography ==
- Die Phyllosomen : Ein Beitrag zur Entwicklungsgeschichte der Loricaten, (1873) (dissertation: Göttingen) – Phllosoma : Contribution to the historical development of loricates.
- Beiträge zur Meeresfauna der Insel Mauritius und der Seychellen, by Karl August Möbius (Foraminifera); Ferdinand Richters (Decapoda) and Eduard von Martens (Mollusca), (1880) – Contribution to the marine fauna of Mauritius and the Seychelles.
- Nordische Tardigraden, in: Zool. Anz., Bd. 27, Nr. 5, p. 168-172, 2 Fig., Leipzig 1903.
- Arktische Tardigraden, in: Fauna arct., Bd. 3, p. 495-508, Tab. 15–16, Jena 1904.
- Campagne arctique de 1907. tardigrades, 1911 (published in French).
- Marine Tardigraden, in: Zool. Anz., Bd. 33, Nt. 2–3, p. 77-85, 4 Fig., Leipzig 1908.
- Südamerikanische Tardigraden, in: Zool. Anz., Bd. 38, p. 273-277, 2 Fig., Leipzig 1911.
- Tardigrada, in: Handwörterb. Naturw., Bd. 9, p. 1015-1020, 10 Fig., Jena 1913.
