= Buccopharyngeal =

In anatomy, buccopharyngeal structures are those pertaining to the cheek and the pharynx or to the mouth and the pharynx.

It may refer to:

- Buccopharyngeal membrane
- Buccopharyngeal fascia
