= Louis Michel François Doyère =

French zoologist and agronomist

- Born: 28 January 1811; Saint-Michel-des-Essartiers, Calvados, France
- Died: 12 July 1863 (aged 52); Bastia, Corsica
- Occupations: Zoology, agronomy
- Employer: National Museum of Natural History, France

Louis Michel François Doyère (28 January 1811 – 12 July 1863) was a French zoologist and agronomist.

He was among the first zoologists to study tardigrades, describing species including Milnesium tardigradum in 1840.

== Life ==
Doyère was born in Saint-Michel-des-Essartiers, Calvados, France, on 28 January 1811.

After obtaining his degree in science, Doyère became a professor in Paris. In 1838, he translated into French the 1836 book Geology and Mineralogy considered with reference to Natural Theology by William Buckland. Two years later, he published with Dezobry and Magdeleine, a work entitled: Lessons in Natural History.

From 1841 to 1842, he was a preparatory assistant at the laboratory of anatomy and natural history of Man, at the French National Museum of Natural History. In 1842, he defended his thesis at the Faculty of Sciences of Paris on the biology of tardigrades, including their ability to survive complete desiccation. In the historian of science Hartmut Greven's words, "The unanimous opinion of all later researchers is that Doyère's dissertation Memoire sur les Tardigrades is an indisputable milestone in tardigradology".

He went into teaching, first at the Lycée Henri-IV in Paris, and then at the Lycée Bonaparte. From 1850 to 1852, he held the chair of zoology applied to agriculture at the Agronomic Institute of Versailles; then that of natural history at the École centrale des arts et manufactures. Later, he published works on silage.

Doyère died in Bastia, Corsica, on 12 July 1863, at age 52.

== Works ==
- 1838: La Géologie et la minéralogie dans leurs rapports avec la théologie naturelle, translation of the 1836 book Geology and Mineralogy considered with reference to Natural Theology by William Buckland (2 volumes, Crochard, Paris).
- 1852: Recherches sur l'alucite des céréales, l'étendue de ses ravages et les moyens de les faire cesser, suivies de quelques résultats relatifs à l'ensilage des grains (Dusacq, Paris).

== Sources ==
- Philippe Jaussaud & Édouard R. Brygoo (2004). Du Jardin au Muséum en 516 biographies. Muséum national d’histoire naturelle de Paris : 630 p. ISBN 2-85653-565-8
