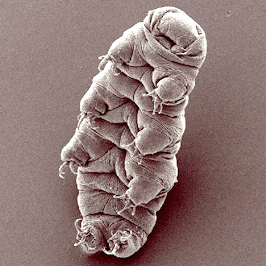
- Hypsibius dujardini

Scientific classification
- Kingdom: Animalia
- Phylum: Tardigrada
- Class: Eutardigrada
- Order: Parachela

Superfamilies and families
- See text

= Parachela (tardigrade) =

Parachela Temporal range: Campanian–Recent

Order of tardigrades

Parachela is an order of tardigrades in the class Eutardigrada. Members of this order have existed for at least 72 million years, up to the present. The oldest known species are Beorn leggi and Aerobius dactylus.

== Superfamilies and families ==
The order includes the following superfamilies and families:

- Family Doryphoribiida
- Superfamily Eohypsiboiidea
  - Family Eohypsibiidae
- Superfamily Hypsibioidea
  - Family Calohypsibiidae
  - Family Hypsibiidae
  - Family Microhypsibiidae
  - Family Ramazzottiidae
- Superfamily Isohypsibioidea
  - Family Halobiotidae
  - Family Hexapodibiidae
  - Family Isohypsibiidae
- Superfamily Macrobiotoidea
  - Family Adorybiotidae
  - Family †Beornidae
  - Family Macrobiotidae
  - Family Murrayidae
  - Family Necopinatidae
  - Family Richtersiusidae
