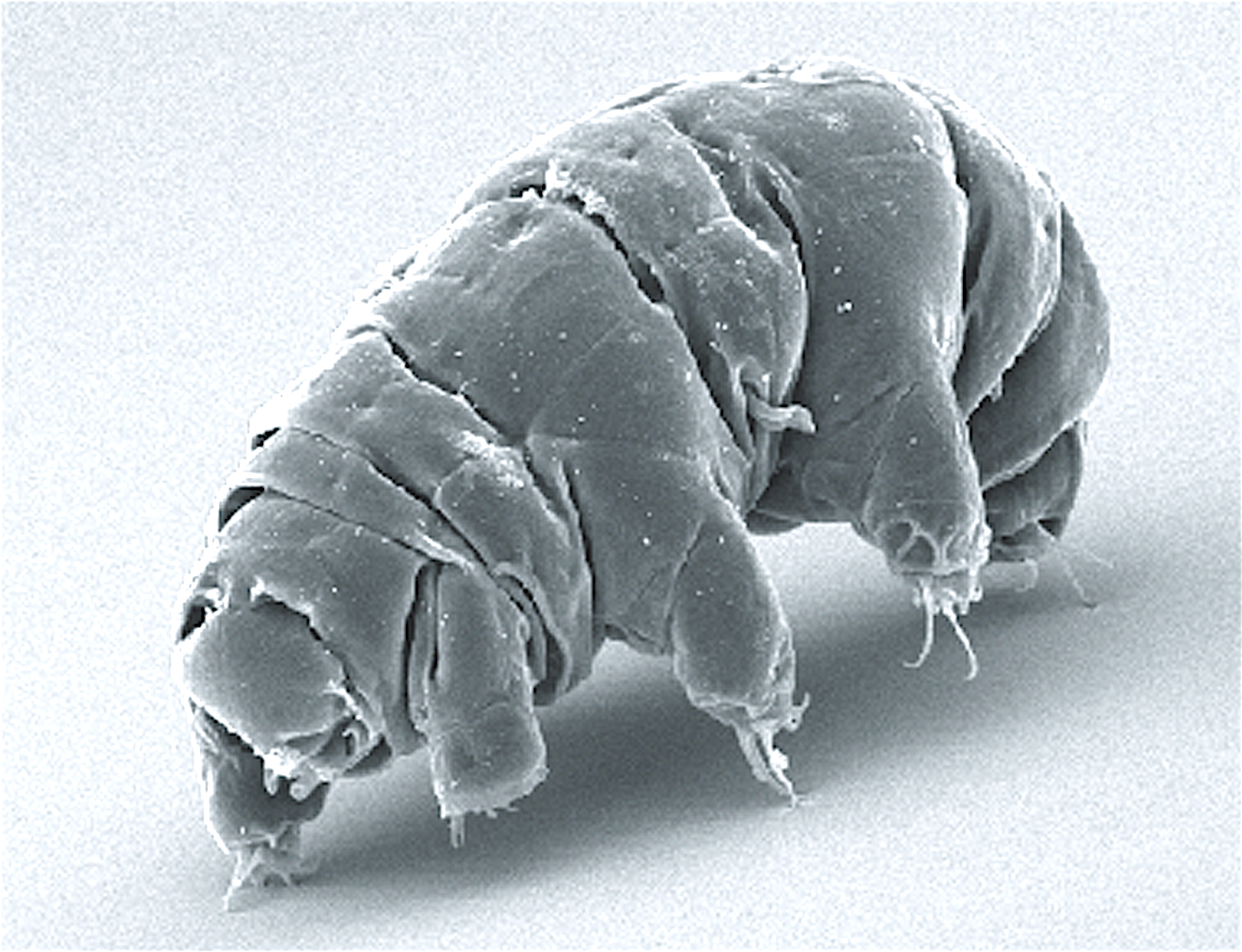
- Milnesium tardigradum

Scientific classification
- Kingdom: Animalia
- Phylum: Tardigrada
- Class: Eutardigrada
- Order: Apochela; Schuster, Nelson, Grigarick & Christenberry, 1980
- Family: Milnesiidae; Ramazzotti, 1962

Genera
- See text

= Milnesiidae =

Milnesiidae Temporal range: Mid Cretaceous-recent

Family of tardigrades

Milnesiidae is a family of tardigrades of the class Eutardigrada. It is the sole family in the order Apochela. In 2019, Noemi Guil and colleagues proposed to promote the order Apochela to the new class Apotardigrada.

== Genera ==
The family consists of the following genera:

- Bergtrollus Dastych, 2011
- Limmenius Horning, Schuster & Grigarick, 1978
- Milnesioides Claxton, 1999
- Milnesium Doyère, 1840
