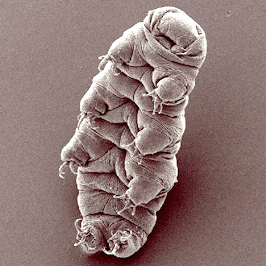
- Hypsibius dujardini

Scientific classification
- Kingdom: Animalia
- Phylum: Tardigrada
- Class: Eutardigrada; Richters, 1926

Orders, superfamilies and families
- Order Apochela; Milnesiidae; Order Parachela; Superfamily Eohypsibioidea; Eohypsibiidae; Superfamily Hypsibioidea; Calohypsibiidae; Hypsibiidae; Microhypsibiidae; Ramazzottiidae; Superfamily Isohypsibioidea; Hexapodibiidae; Isohypsibiidae; Superfamily Macrobiotoidea; Beornidae; Macrobiotidae; Murrayidae; Necopinatidae; Richtersiusidae

= Eutardigrade =

Eutardigrade Temporal range: Cretaceous–Recent

Class of tardigrades

Eutardigrada are a class of tardigrades (Tardigrada) without lateral appendages. Primarily freshwater bound, some species have secondarily gained the ability to live in marine environments (Halobiotus). By cryptobiosis many species are able to live temporarily in very dry environments. More than 700 species have been described.

The order Apochela consists of only one family, Milnesiidae, with two genera: Milnesium and Limmenius. Milnesium tardigradum can be found worldwide and is one of the biggest species among tardigrades (up to 1.4 mm); similar-looking species have been found in Cretaceous amber. The mouth of this predator has a wide opening, so the animal can eat rotifers and larger protists. Other eutardigrades belong to the order Parachela.
