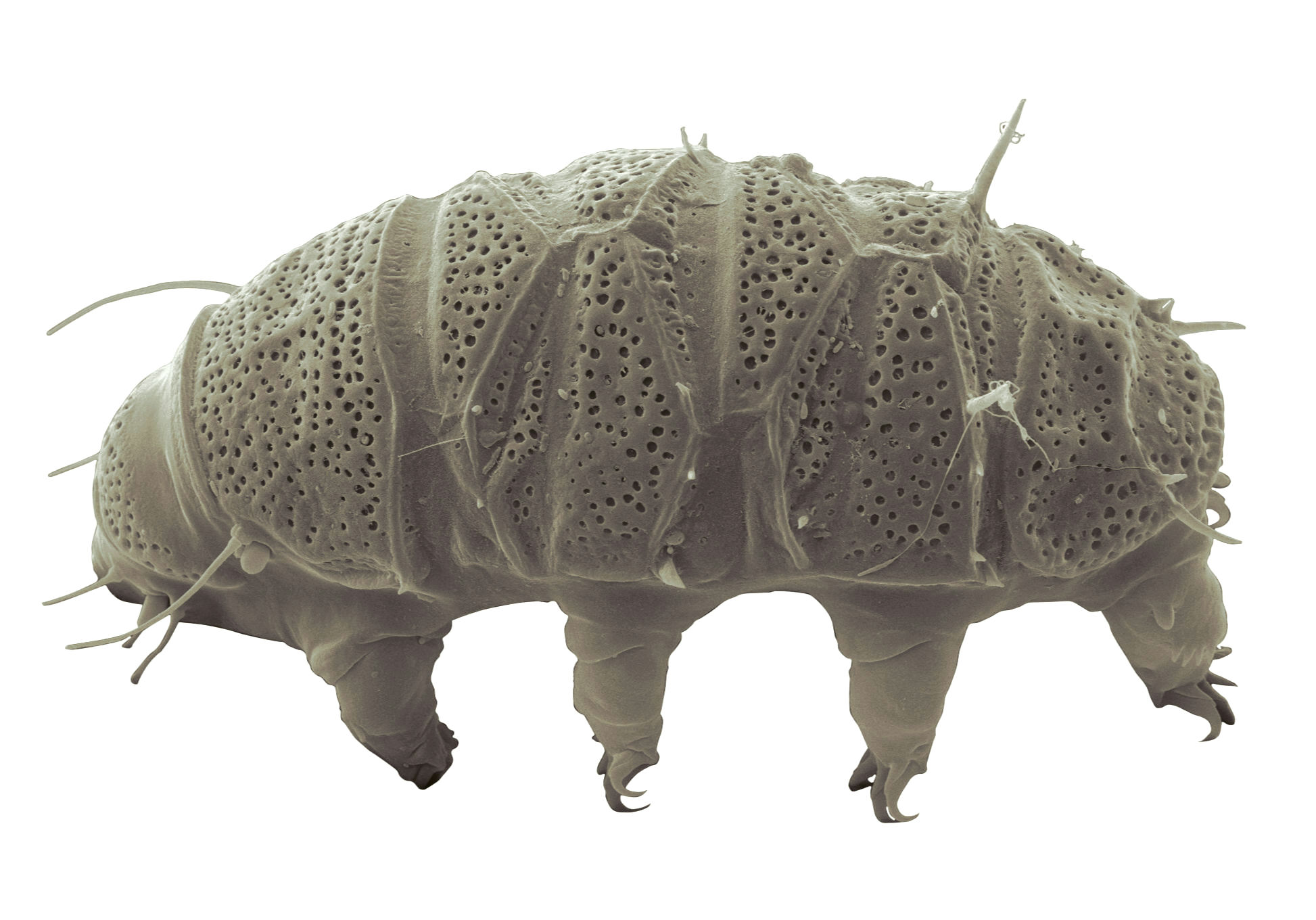
- Echiniscus insularis, a heterotardigrade

Scientific classification
- Kingdom: Animalia
- Subkingdom: Eumetazoa
- Clade: ParaHoxozoa
- Clade: Bilateria
- Clade: Nephrozoa
- Clade: Protostomia
- Superphylum: Ecdysozoa
- Clade: Panarthropoda
- Phylum: Tardigrada; Spallanzani, 1776

Classes
- Eutardigrada; Heterotardigrada; Mesotardigrada (dubious)

= Tardigrade =

Tardigrade Temporal range: Turonian –Recent Middle Cambrian stem-group fossils
- Milnesium tardigradum, a eutardigrade

Phylum of microscopic animals

Tardigrades (/ˈtɑːrdɪɡreɪdz/), also known as water bears or moss piglets, are a phylum of eight-legged segmented micro-animals. They were first described by the German zoologist Johann August Ephraim Goeze in 1773, who called them Kleiner Wasserbär 'little water bear'. In 1776, the Italian biologist Lazzaro Spallanzani named them Tardigrada, which means "slow walkers".

Tardigrades live in diverse regions of Earth's biosphere: mountaintops, the deep sea, tropical rainforests, and the Antarctic. They are among the most resilient animals known, with individual species able to survive severe conditions – such as exposure to extreme temperatures, extreme pressures (both high and low), air deprivation, radiation, dehydration, and starvation – that would quickly kill most other forms of life. They have survived exposure to outer space.

There are about 1,500 known species in the phylum Tardigrada, a part of the superphylum Ecdysozoa. The earliest known fossil is from the Cambrian, some 500 million years ago. They lack several of the Hox genes found in arthropods, and the middle region of the body corresponding to an arthropod's thorax and abdomen. Instead, most of their body is homologous to an arthropod's head.

Tardigrades are usually about 0.5 mm (0.02 in) long when fully grown. They are short and plump, with four pairs of legs, each ending in claws (usually four to eight) or sticky pads. Tardigrades are prevalent in mosses and lichens and can readily be collected and viewed under a low-power microscope, making them accessible to students and amateur scientists. Their clumsy crawling and their well-known ability to survive extreme conditions have brought them into science fiction and popular culture including items of clothing, statues, soft toys and crochet patterns.

== Description ==
=== Body structure ===
Tardigrade anatomy

Tardigrades have a short plump body with four pairs of hollow unjointed legs. Most range from 0.05 to 0.5 mm (0.002 to 0.02 in) in length, although the largest species may reach 1.3 mm (0.051 in). The body cavity is a haemocoel, an open circulatory system, filled with a colourless fluid. The body covering is a cuticle that is replaced when the animal moults; it contains hardened (sclerotised) proteins and chitin but is not calcified. Each leg ends in one or more claws according to the species; in some species, the claws are modified as sticky pads. In marine species, the legs are telescopic. There are no lungs, gills, or blood vessels, so tardigrades rely on diffusion through the cuticle and body cavity for gas exchange. Tardigrades have been suggested to be eutelic, with a fixed number of body cells at maturity, but there is evidence that they are not.

=== Nervous system and senses ===
The tardigrade nervous system has a pair of ventral nerve cords with a pair of ganglia serving each pair of legs. The nerve cords end near the mouth at a pair of subpharyngeal (or suboesophageal) ganglia. These are connected by paired commissures (either side of the tube from the mouth to the pharynx) to the dorsally located cerebral ganglion or 'brain'. Also in the head are two eyespots in the brain, and several sensory cirri and pairs of hollow antenna-like clavae which may be chemoreceptors.

The tardigrade Dactylobiotus dispar can be trained by classical conditioning to curl up into the defensive 'tun' state in response to a blue light associated with a small electric shock, an aversive stimulus. This demonstrates that tardigrades are capable of learning.

Tardigrade walking (Hypsibius dujardini)

=== Locomotion ===
Although the body is flexible and fluid-filled, locomotion does not operate mainly hydrostatically. Instead, as in arthropods, the muscles (sometimes just one or a few cells) work in antagonistic pairs that make each leg step backwards and forwards; there are also some flexors that work against hydrostatic pressure of the haemocoel. The claws help to stop the legs sliding during walking, and are used for gripping.

=== Feeding and excretion ===
Tardigrades feed by sucking animal or plant cell fluids, or on detritus. A pair of stylets composed of the mineral aragonite pierce the prey; the pharynx muscles then pump the fluids from the prey into the gut. A pair of salivary glands secrete a digestive fluid into the mouth, and produce replacement stylets each time the animal moults. Non-marine species have excretory Malpighian tubules where the intestine joins the hindgut. Some species have excretory or other glands between or at the base of the legs.

Video of tardigrade under the microscope

Living tardigrades moving around, filmed using dark-field microscopy

=== Reproduction and life cycle ===
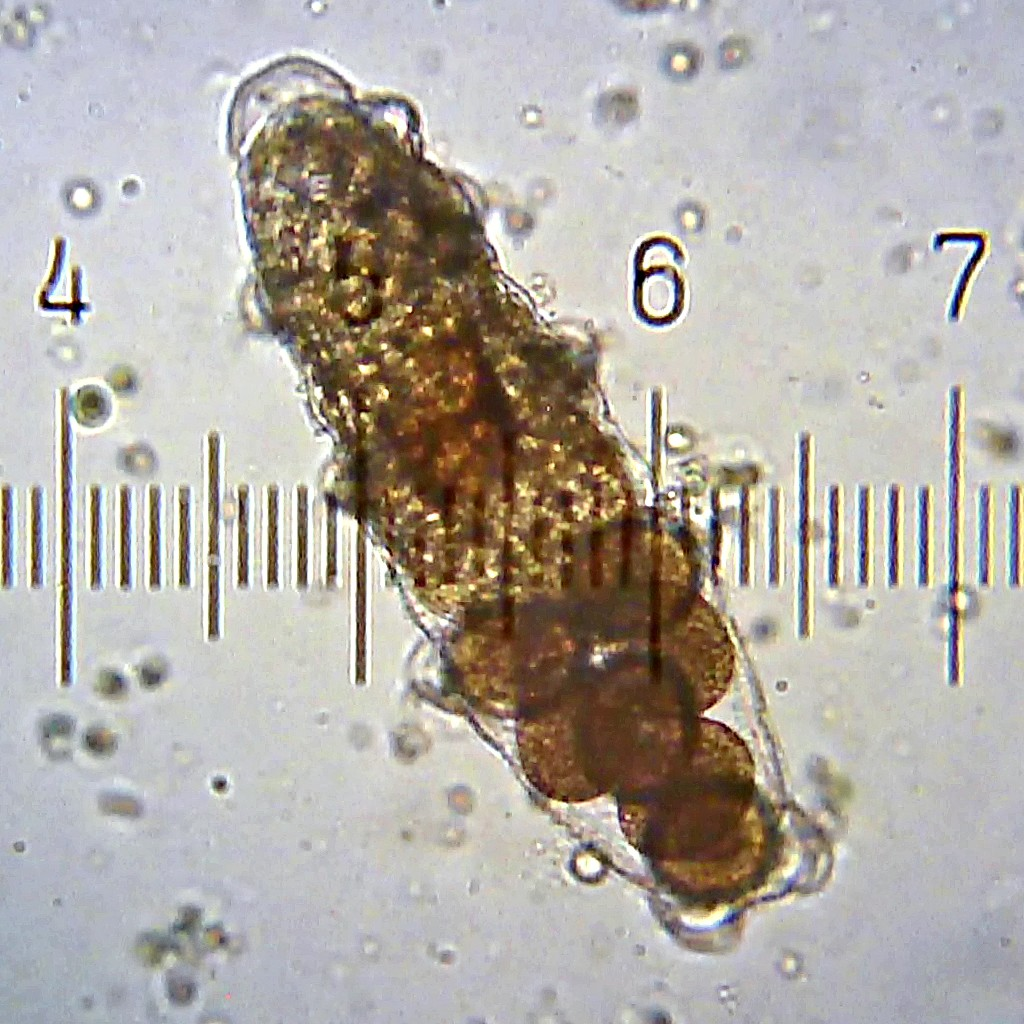
Shed cuticle of female tardigrade, containing eggs, each 50μm across

Some species are hermaphroditic and self-fertilizing, but most tardigrade species have both male and female individuals, which copulate by a variety of methods. The females lay eggs; those of Austeruseus faeroensis are spherical, 80 μm in diameter, with a knobbled surface. In other species, the eggs can be ovoid, as in Hypsibius annulatus, or may be spherical with pyramidal or bottle-shaped surface ornamentation. Some species appear to have no males, suggesting that parthenogenesis is common.

Both sexes have a single gonad (an ovary or testis) located above the intestine. A pair of ducts run from the testis, opening through a single gonopore in front of the anus. Females have a single oviduct opening either just above the anus or directly into the rectum, which forms a cloaca.

The male may place his sperm into the cloaca, or may penetrate the female's cuticle and place the sperm straight into her body cavity, for it to fertilise the eggs directly in the ovary. A third mechanism in species such as H. annulatus is for the male to place the sperm under the female's cuticle; when she moults, she lays eggs into the cast cuticle, where they are fertilised. Courtship occurs in some aquatic tardigrades, with the male stroking his partner with his cirri to stimulate her to lay eggs; fertilisation is then external.

Up to 30 eggs are laid, depending on the species. Terrestrial tardigrade eggs have drought-resistant shells. Aquatic species either glue their eggs to a substrate or leave them in a cast cuticle. The eggs hatch within 14 days, and the hatchlings use their stylets to open their egg shells.

== Ecology and life history ==
Tardigrades as a group are cosmopolitan, living in many environments on land, in freshwater, and in the sea. Their eggs and resistant life-cycle stages (cysts and tuns) are small and durable enough to enable long-distance transport, whether on the feet of other animals or by the wind.

Individual species have more specialised distributions, many being both regional and limited to a single type of habitat, such as mountains. Some species have wide distributions: for instance, Echiniscus lineatus is pantropical. Halobiotus is restricted to cold Holarctic seas. Species such as Borealibius and Echiniscus lapponicus have a discontinuous distribution, being both polar and on tall mountains. This could be a result of long-distance transport by the wind or the remains of an ancient geographic range when the climate was colder. A small percentage of species may be cosmopolitan.

The majority of species live in damp habitats such as on lichens, liverworts, and mosses, and directly in soil and leaf litter. In freshwater and the sea, they live on and in the bottom, such as in between particles or around seaweeds. More specialised habitats include hot springs and as parasites or commensals of marine invertebrates. In soil, there can be as many as 300,000 per square metre; on mosses, they can reach a density of over 2 million per square metre.

Tardigrades are host to many microbial symbionts and parasites. In glacial environments, the bacterial genera Flavobacterium, Ferruginibacter, and Polaromonas are common in tardigrades' microbiomes. Many tardigrades are predatory; Milnesium lagniappe includes other tardigrades such as Macrobiotus acadianus among its prey. Tardigrades consume prey such as nematodes, and are themselves preyed upon by soil arthropods including mites, spiders and cantharid beetle larvae.

Except for 62 exclusively freshwater species, all non-marine tardigrades are found in terrestrial environments. Because the majority of the marine species belong to Heterotardigrada, the most ancestral class, the phylum evidently has a marine origin.

== Environmental tolerance ==
Tardigrades are not considered universally extremophilic because they are not adapted to exploit many of the extreme conditions that their environmental tolerance has been measured in, only to endure them. This means that their chances of dying increase the longer they are exposed to these extreme environments, whereas true extremophiles thrive there.

=== Dehydrated 'tun' state ===
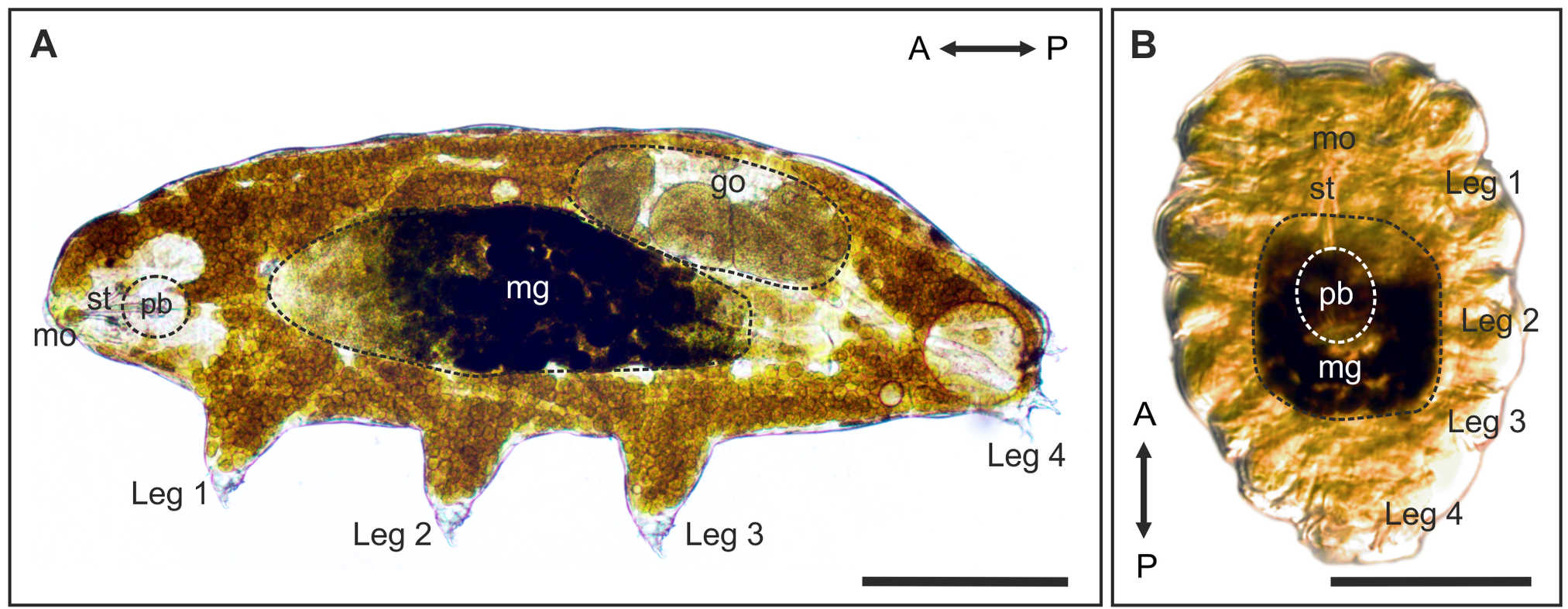
Richtersius coronifer in active and 'tun' states. A↔P = anterior-posterior; mg = midgut; go = gonad; pb = pharyngeal bulb; mo = mouth; st = stylet Scale bars = 100 μm

Tardigrades are capable of suspending their metabolism, going into a state of cryptobiosis. Terrestrial and freshwater tardigrades are able to tolerate long periods when water is not available, such as when the moss or pond they are living in dries out, by drawing their legs in and forming a desiccated cyst, the cryptobiotic 'tun' state, where no metabolic activity takes place. In this state, they can go without food or water for several years. Further, in that state they become highly resistant to environmental stresses, including temperatures from as low as −272 °C (−458 °F) to as much as +149 °C (300 °F) (at least for short periods of time), lack of oxygen, vacuum, ionising radiation, and high pressure.

=== Surviving other stresses ===
Marine tardigrades such as Halobiotus crispae alternate each year (cyclomorphosis) between an active summer morph and a hibernating winter morph (a pseudosimplex) that can resist freezing and low salinity, but which remains active throughout. Reproduction, however, takes place only in the summer morph.

Tardigrades can survive impacts up to about 900 metres per second (3,000 ft/s), and momentary shock pressures up to about 1.14 gigapascals (165,000 psi).

=== Exposure to space ===
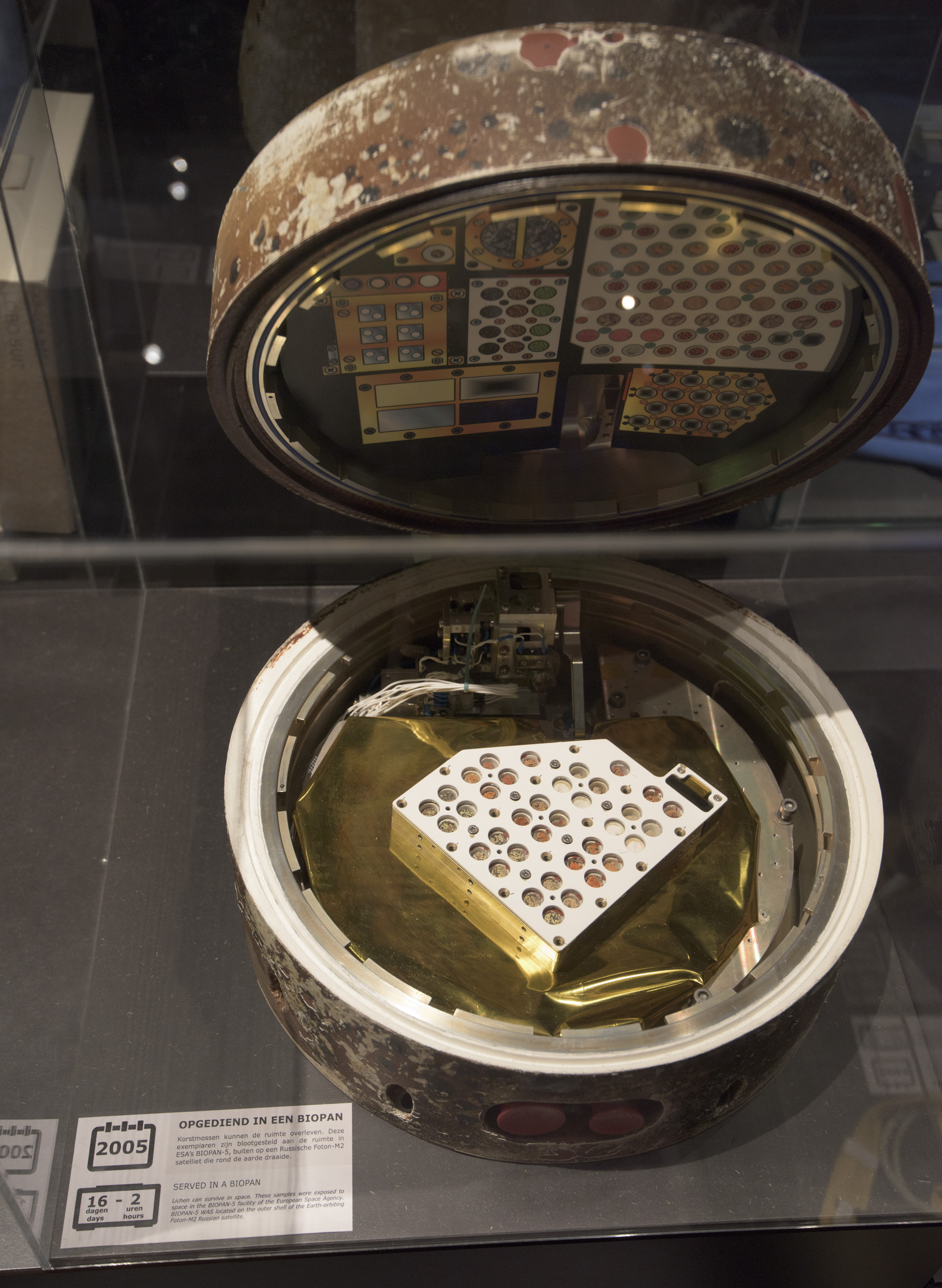
The 2007 FOTON-M3 mission carrying the BIOPAN astrobiology payload (illustrated) exposed tardigrades to vacuum, solar ultraviolet, or both, showing their ability to survive in the space environment.

Tardigrades have survived exposure to space. In 2007, samples of 30 tardigrades and 30 eggs, all dehydrated, were taken on the FOTON-M3 mission and exposed to vacuum, to both vacuum and UVA & B light, or to both vacuum and the full range of solar ultraviolet, for 10 days. Back on Earth, the samples were rehydrated to assess their activity, egg laying, and egg quality (viability). Vacuum exposure alone had no significant effect on any metric, but, when combined with UV exposure, killed many of the tuns. Only 1 R. coronifer specimen and 68% of the M. tardigradum specimens exposed to the limited UV range were reanimated by rehydration; mortality was high in the following days, and survivors' egg-laying was reduced. Exposure to full solar ultraviolet was much more lethal, with only three subjects of M. tardigradum surviving. In 2011, tardigrades went on the International Space Station STS-134, showing that they could survive microgravity and cosmic radiation, and should be suitable model organisms. In 2019, a capsule containing tardigrades in a cryptobiotic state was on board the Israeli lunar lander Beresheet which crashed on the Moon.

=== Damage protection proteins ===
Tardigrades' ability to stay desiccated for long periods of time was thought to depend on high levels of the sugar trehalose, common in organisms that survive desiccation. However, tardigrades do not synthesize enough trehalose for this function. Instead, tardigrades produce intrinsically disordered proteins in response to desiccation. Three of these are specific to tardigrades and have been called tardigrade specific proteins. These may protect membranes from damage by associating with the polar heads of lipid molecules. The proteins may also form a glass-like matrix that protects cytoplasm from damage during desiccation. Anhydrobiosis in response to desiccation has a complex molecular basis; in Hypsibius exemplaris, 1,422 genes are upregulated during the process. Of those, 406 are specific to tardigrades, 55 being intrinsically disordered and the others globular with unknown functions.

Tardigrades possess a cold shock protein; Maria Kamilari and colleagues propose (2019) that this may serve "as a RNA-chaperone involved in regulation of translation [of RNA code to proteins] following freezing."

Tardigrade DNA is protected from radiation by the Dsup ("damage suppressor") protein. The Dsup proteins of Ramazzottius varieornatus and H. exemplaris promote survival by binding to nucleosomes and protecting chromosomal DNA from hydroxyl radicals. The Dsup protein of R. varieornatus confers resistance to ultraviolet-C by upregulating DNA repair genes.

Some of these proteins are of interest to biomedical research. Potential is seen in Dsup's ability to protect against damage; in CAHS and LEA's ability to protect from desiccation; and some CAHS proteins could serve to prevent programmed cell death (apoptosis).

== Taxonomic history ==
In 1773, Johann August Ephraim Goeze named the tardigrade Kleiner Wasserbär, meaning 'little water-bear' in German (today, Germans often call them Bärtierchen 'little bear-animal'). The name water bear comes from the way they walk, reminiscent of a bear's gait. The name Tardigradum means 'slow walker' and was given by Lazzaro Spallanzani in 1776. In 1834, C.A.S. Schulze gave the first formal description of a tardigrade, Macrobiotus hufelandi, in a work subtitled "a new animal from the crustacean class, capable of reviving after prolonged asphyxia and dryness". This was soon followed by descriptions of species including Echiniscus testudo, Milnesium tardigradum, Hypsibius dujardini, and Ramazzottius oberhaeuseri by L.M.F. Doyère in 1840. All four of these are now the nominal species for higher tardigrade taxa. The zoologist Hartmut Greven wrote that "The unanimous opinion of all later researchers is that Doyère's 1842 dissertation Memoire sur les Tardigrades is an indisputable milestone in tardigradology".

Ferdinand Richters worked on the taxonomy of tardigrades from 1900 to 1913, with studies of Nordic, Arctic, marine, and South American species; he described many species at this time, and in 1926 proposed the class Eutardigrada. In 1927, Ernst Marcus created the class Heterotardigrada, and in 1929 a monograph on tardigrades which Greven describes as "comprehensive" and "unsurpassed today". In 1937 Gilbert Rahm, studying the fauna of Japan's hot springs, distinguished the class Mesotardigrada, with a single species Thermozodium esakii; its validity is now doubted. In 1962, Giuseppe Ramazzotti proposed the phylum Tardigrada. In 2019, Noemi Guil and colleagues proposed to promote the order Apochela to the new class Apotardigrada. There are some 1,488 described species of tardigrades, organised into 160 genera and 36 families.

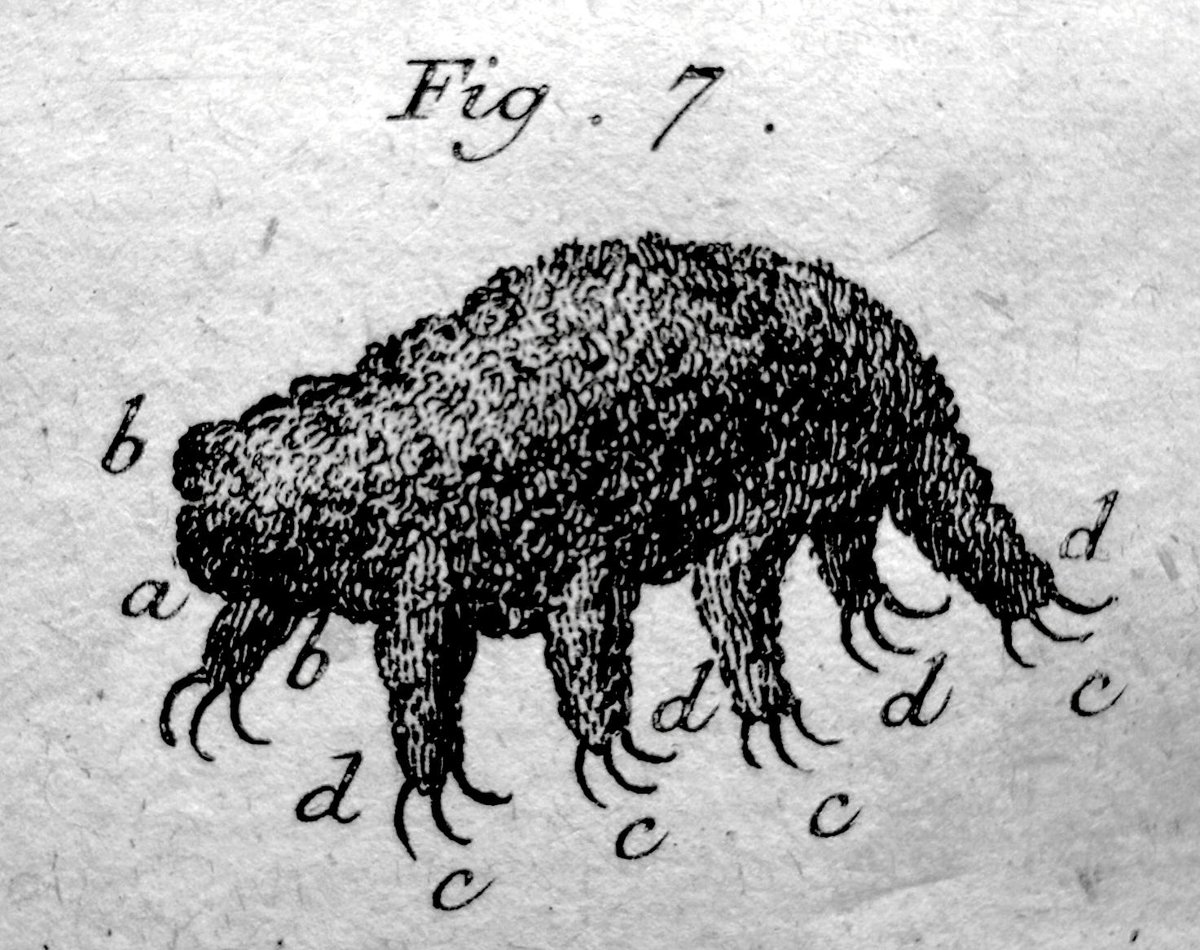
The first drawing of a tardigrade, by Johann August Ephraim Goeze, 1773

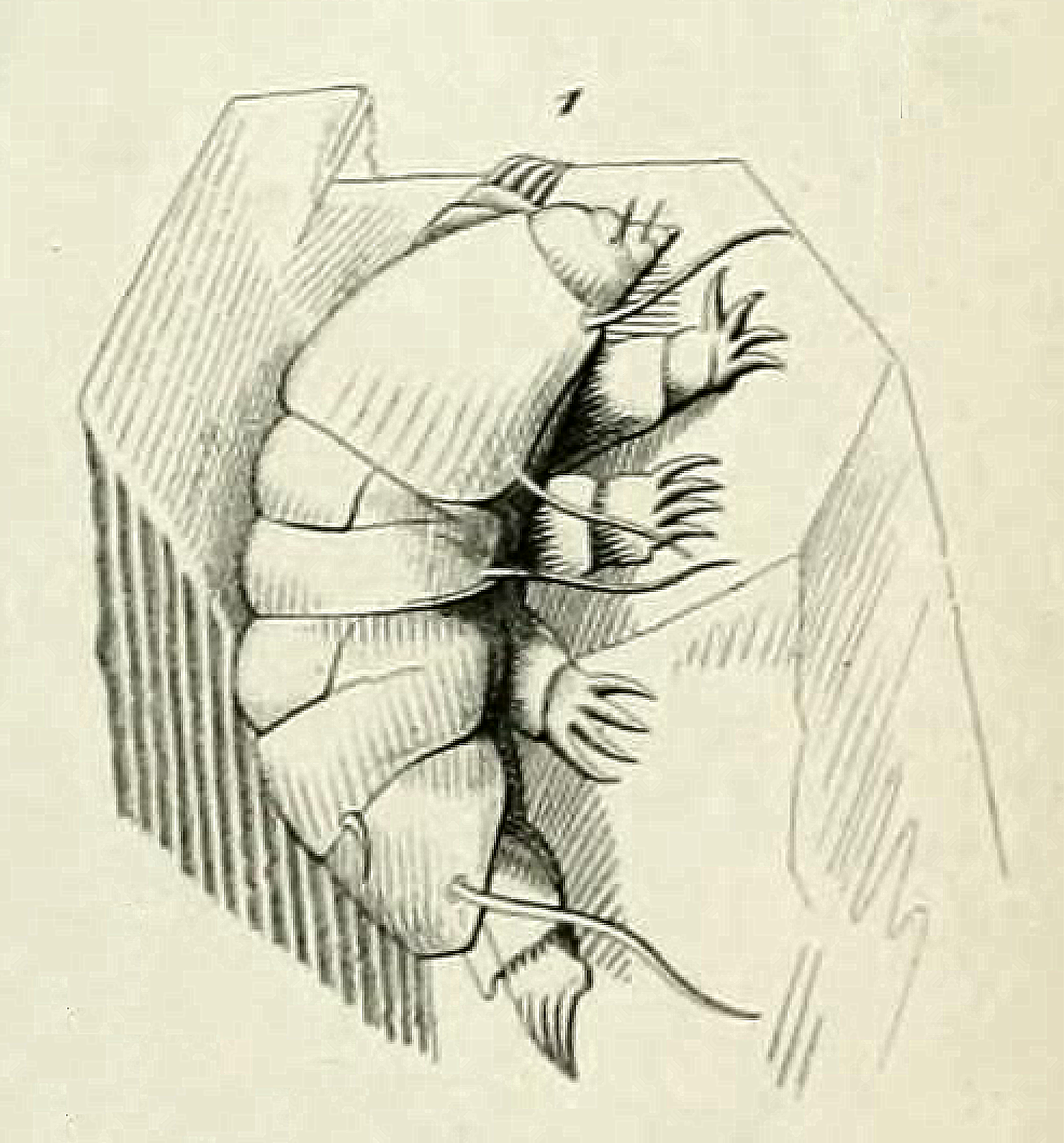
Drawing of Echiniscus testudo on a grain of sand by L.M.F. Doyère, 1840

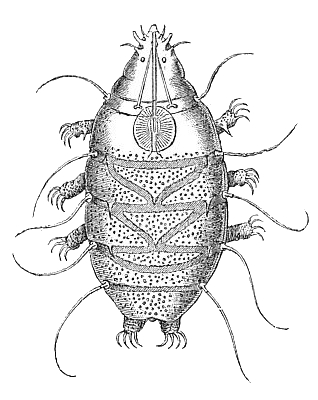
Drawing of Echiniscus sp. by C.A.S. Schultze, 1861

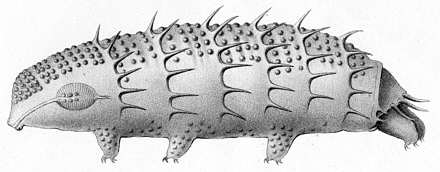
Drawing of Calohypsibius (Macrobiotus) ornatus var. spinifer by Ferdinand Richters, 1900

== Evolution ==
=== Evolutionary history ===
Tardigrade fossils are rare. The only known specimens are those from mid-Cambrian deposits in Siberia (in the Orsten fauna) and a few specimens in amber from the Cretaceous of North America and the Neogene of the Dominican Republic. The Siberian fossils differ from living tardigrades in several ways. They have three pairs of legs rather than four, they have a simplified head morphology, and they have no posterior head appendages, but they share with modern tardigrades their columnar cuticle construction. Scientists think they represent a stem group of living tardigrades.

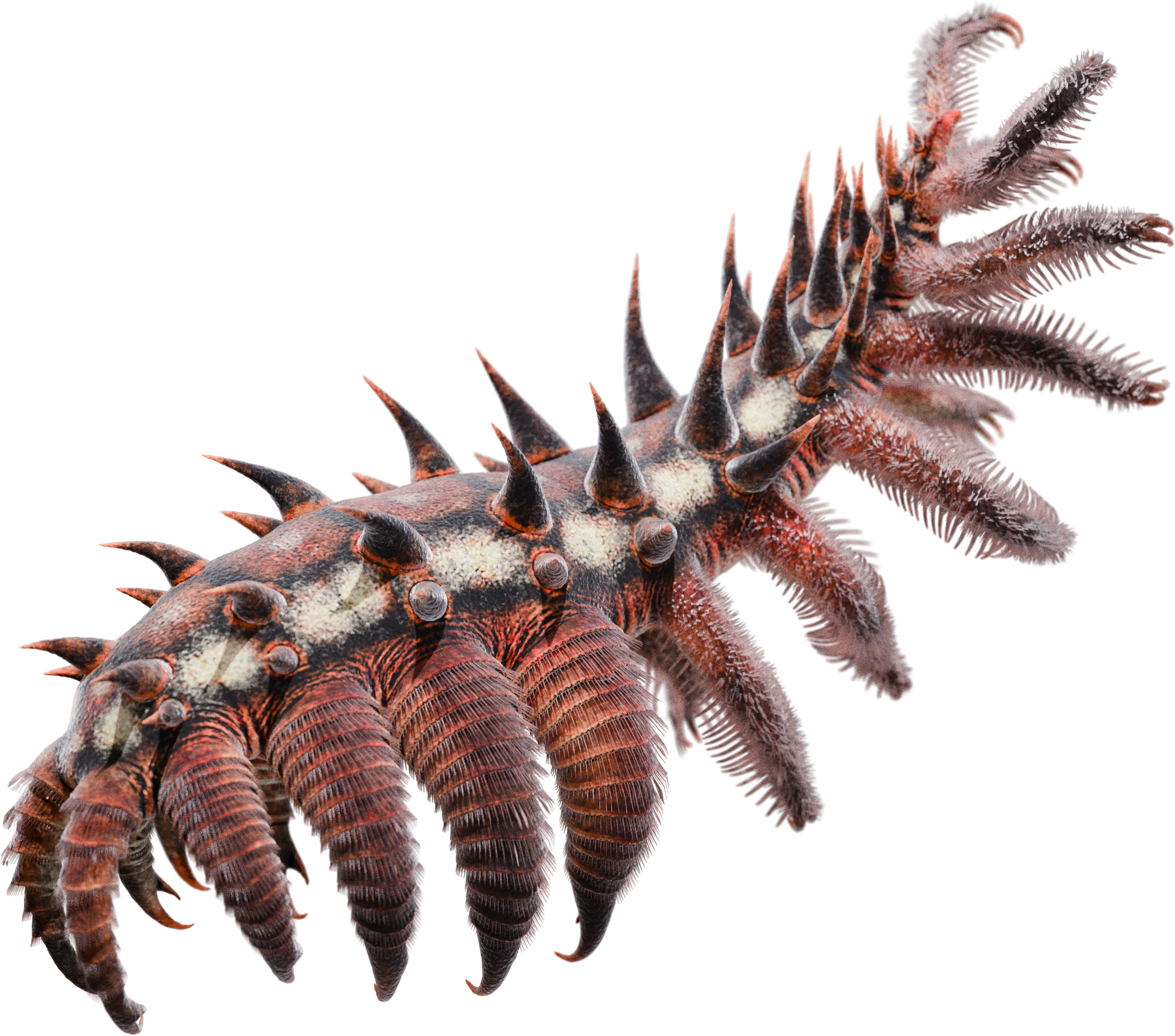
The lobopod-like luolishaniids from the Cambrian and Ordovician are possibly the closest fossil relatives of tardigrades. Entothyreos reconstruction shown.

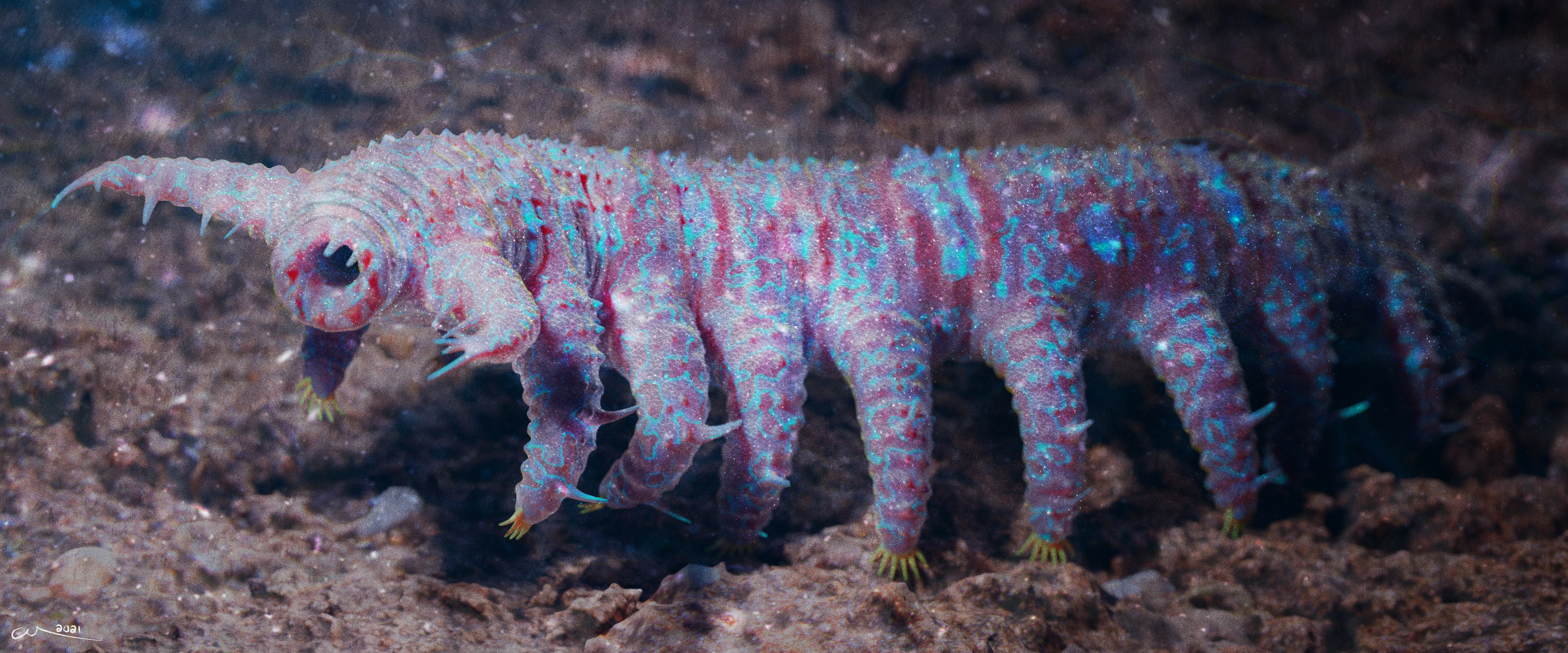
Tardigrades may be descended from a lobopod that resembled Aysheaia.

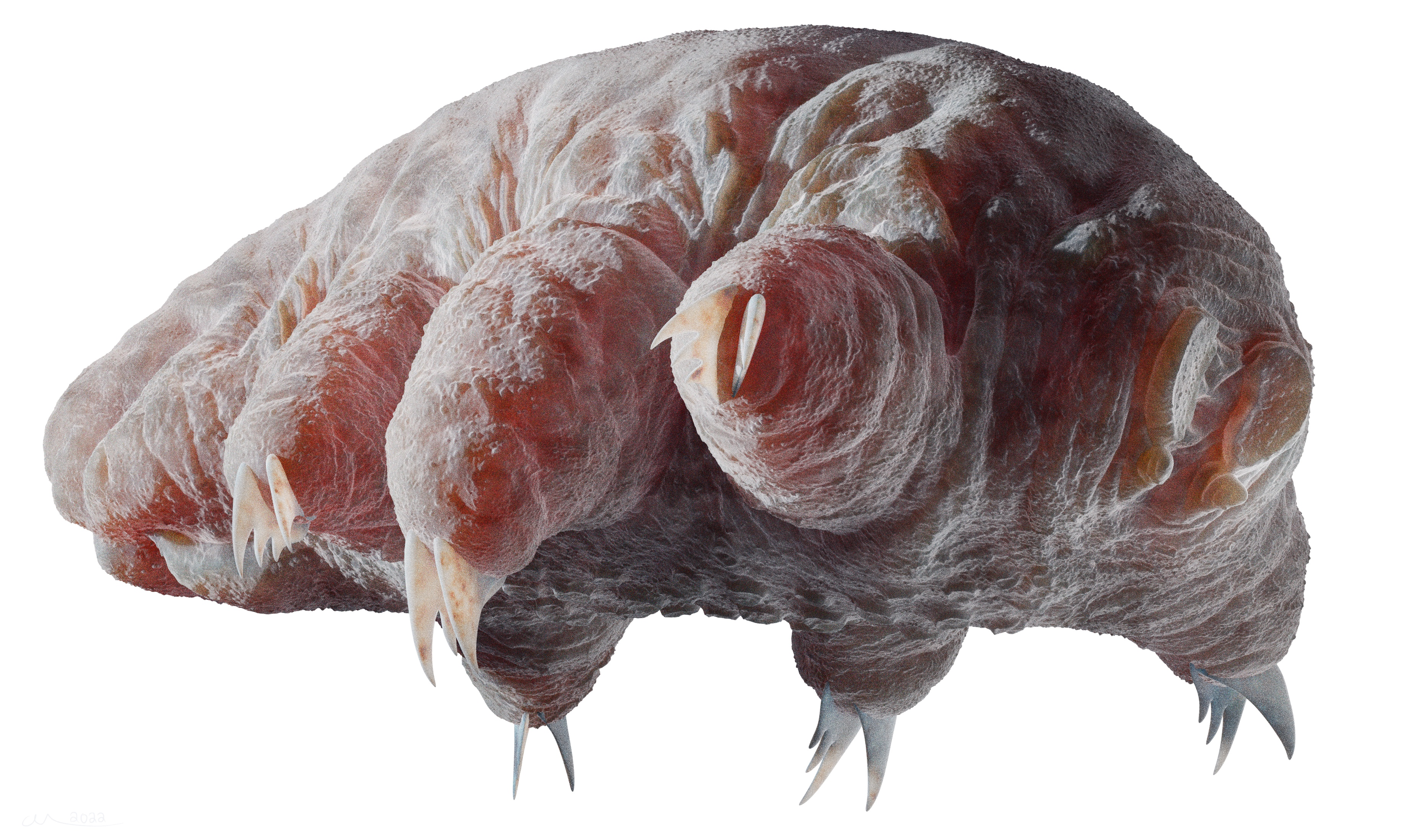
Reconstruction of the unnamed Orsten fauna tardigrade, from the Cambrian Kuonamka Formation, c. 500 mya

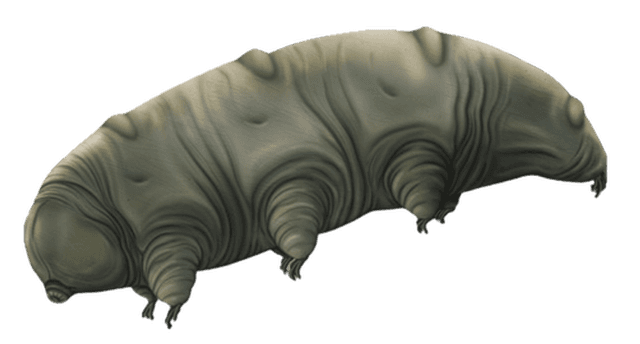
Reconstruction of Paradoryphoribius, from the Miocene (23–5.3 mya)

Multiple lines of evidence show that tardigrades are secondarily miniaturised from a larger ancestor, probably a lobopodian, perhaps resembling the mid-Cambrian Aysheaia, which many analyses place close to the divergence of the tardigrade lineage. An alternative hypothesis derives tactopoda from a clade encompassing dinocaridids and Opabinia. The enigmatic panarthropodan Sialomorpha found in 30-million year old Dominican amber, while not a tardigrade, shows some apparent affinities. A 2023 morphological analysis concluded that luolishaniids, a group of Cambrian lobopodians, might be the tardigrades' closest known relatives.

The oldest remains of modern tardigrades are those of Milnesium swolenskyi, belonging to the living genus Milnesium known from a Late Cretaceous (Turonian) aged specimen of New Jersey amber, around 90 mya. Another fossil species, Beorn leggi, is known from a Late Campanian (~72 mya) specimen of Canadian amber, belonging to the family Hypsibiidae. The related hypsibioidean Aerobius dactylus was found in the same amber piece. The youngest known fossil tadigrade genus, Paradoryphoribius, was discovered in amber dated to about 16 mya.

Morphological and molecular phylogenetics studies have attempted to define how tardigrades relate to other ecdysozoan groups; alternative placements have been proposed within the Panarthropoda. The Tactopoda hypothesis holds that Tardigrada are sister to Arthropoda; the Antennopoda hypothesis is that Tardigrada are sister to (Onychophora + Arthropoda); and the Lobopodia (sensu Smith & Goldstein 2017) hypothesis is that Tardigrada are sister to Onychophora. The relationships have been debated on the basis of conflicting evidence.

=== Genomics ===
Tardigrade genomes vary widely in size. Hypsibius exemplaris (part of the Hypsibius dujardini group) has a compact genome of 100 megabase pairs and a generation time of about two weeks; it can be cultured indefinitely and cryopreserved. The genome of Ramazzottius varieornatus, one of the most stress-tolerant species of tardigrades, is about half as big, at 55 Mb. About 1.6% of its genes are the result of horizontal gene transfer from other species, not implying any dramatic effect.

Genomic studies across different tardigrade groups help reconstruct the evolution of their genome, such as the relationship of tardigrade body segments to those of other Panarthropoda. A 2023 review concludes that despite the diversity of body plan among the Panarthropoda, the tardigrade body plan maps best with "a simple one-to-one alignment of anterior segments". Such studies may eventually reveal how they miniaturised themselves from larger ecdysozoans.

Tardigrades lack several of the Hox genes found in arthropods, and a large intermediate region of the body axis. In insects, this corresponds to the entire thorax and abdomen. Practically the whole body, except for the last pair of legs, is made up of just the segments that are homologous to the head region in arthropods. This implies that tardigrades evolved from an ancestral ecdysozoan with a longer body and more segments.

Tardigrade body plan compared to arthropods, onychophora, and annelids. Tardigrades have lost the whole middle section of the ecdysozoan body plan, and its Hox genes.

=== Phylogeny ===
==== External phylogeny ====
Tardigrades' closest living relatives are the arthropods and velvet worms, with the three forming the clade Panarthropoda. All three groups evolved from a broader group of legged, worm-like animals known as the lobopodians. In 2023, based on numerous morphological similarities, it was determined that that an order of lobopodians called Luolishaniida might be the closest known relatives of tardigrades. This was again found in a 2025 phylogeny by Knecht et al. (a simplified version is shown below)

- Panarthropoda
  - † "Lobopodia"
  - - - † "Lobopodia"
      - - Tardigrada
        - † Luolishaniida
    - - † Aysheaiidae
      - Antennopoda
        - - † "Lobopodia"
          - - † Opabiniidae
            - - † Radiodonts (Radiodonta)
              - Arthropods (Arthropoda)
        - - † Antennacanthopodia
          - Onychophora (velvet worms)

==== Internal phylogeny ====
In 2012, the phylogeny of the phylum was studied using molecular markers (ribosomal RNA), finding that the Heterotardigrada and Arthrotardigrada seemed to be paraphyletic.

- Tardigrada
  - "Arthrotardigrada"
  - - Echiniscoidea
    - Eutardigrada
      - Apochela
        Milnesiidae
      - Parachela
        - Isohypsibiodea
        - - Macrobiotoidea
          - Hypsibioidea

In 2018, a report integrating multiple morphological and molecular studies concluded that while the Arthrotardigrada appear to be paraphyletic, the Heterotardigrada is an accepted clade. All the lower-level taxa have been much reorganised, but the major groupings remain in place.

- Tardigrada
  - Heterotardigrada
    - "Arthrotardigrada"
    - Echiniscoidea
  - Eutardigrada
    - - Apochela
        Milnesiidae
      - Parachela
        - Isohypsibiodea
        - - Macrobiotoidea
          - Hypsibioidea

In 2019, Noemi Guil and colleagues proposed to promote the order Apochela to the new class Apotardigrada.

- Tardigrada
  - Heterotardigrada
    - "Arthrotardigrada"
    - Echiniscoidea
  - - - Apotardigrada/Apochela
        Milnesiidae
      - Eutardigrada/Parachela
        - Isohypsibiodea
        - - Macrobiotoidea
          - Hypsibioidea

== In culture and society ==
=== Early 20th century beginnings ===
Possibly the first time that tardigrades appear in non-scientific literature is in the short-story "Bathybia" by the geologist and explorer Douglas Mawson. Published in the 1908 book Aurora Australis and printed in the Antarctic, it deals with an expedition to the South Pole where the team encounters giant mushrooms and arthropods. The team watches a giant tardigrade fighting a similarly enormous rotifer; another giant water bear bites a man's toe, rendering him comatose for half an hour with its anaesthetic bite. Finally, a four-foot-long tardigrade, waking from hibernation, scares the narrator from his sleep, and he realizes it was all a dream.

=== Popularity ===
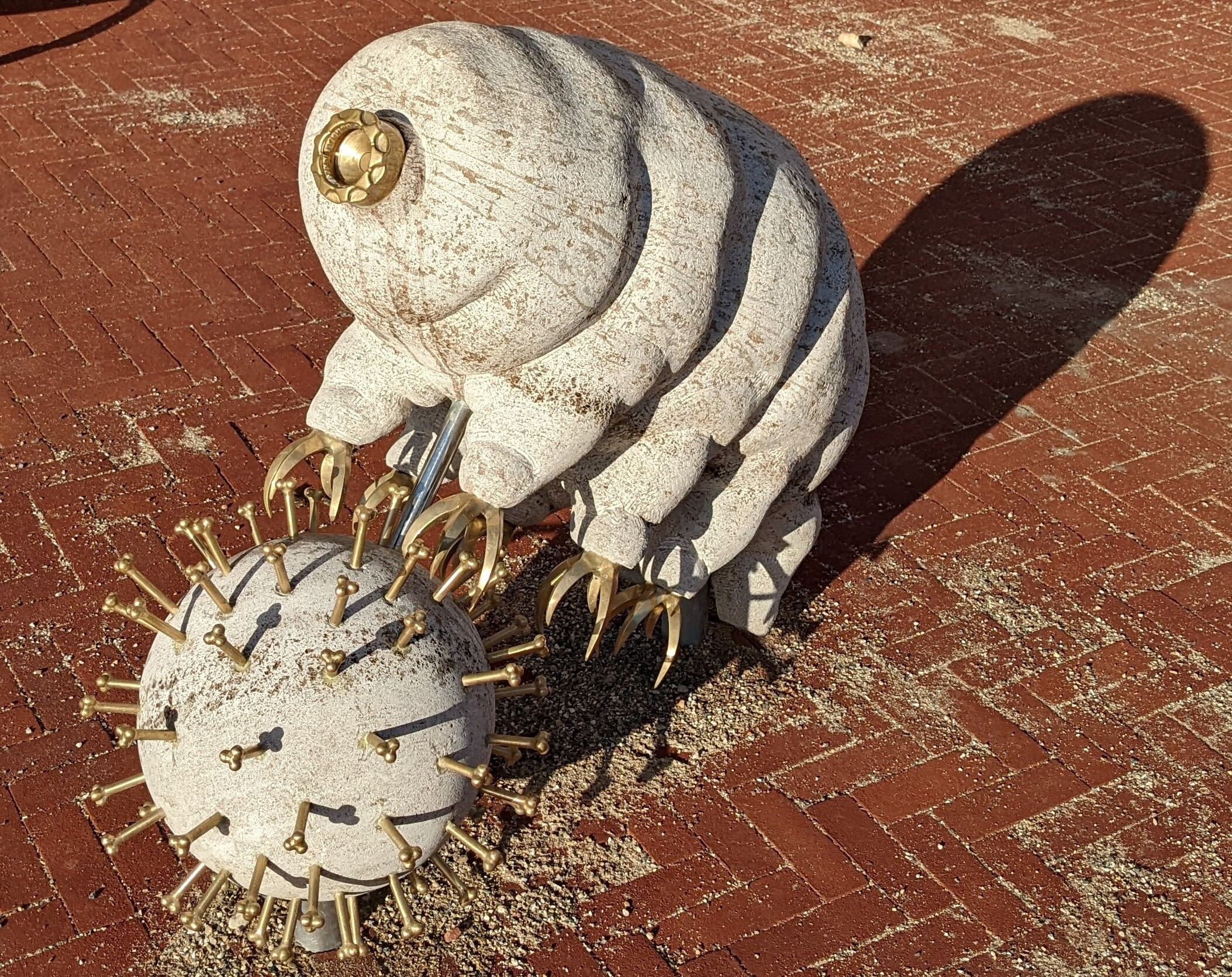
Tardigrade sculpture Noah's Ark 3.0 by Arno Coenen, St Eusebius' Church, Arnhem, the Netherlands

Tardigrades are common in mosses and lichens on walls and roofs, and can readily be collected and viewed under a low-power microscope. If they are dry, they can be reanimated on a microscope slide by adding a little water, making them accessible to beginning students and amateur scientists. Current Biology attributed their popularity to "their clumsy crawling [which] is about as adorable as can be." The zoologists James F. Fleming and Kazuharu Arakawa called them "a charismatic phylum". They have been famous for their ability to survive life-stopping events such as being dried out since Spallanzani first resuscitated them from some dry sediment in a gutter in the 18th century. In 2015, the astrophysicist and science communicator Neil deGrasse Tyson described Earth as "the planet of the tardigrades", and they were nominated for the American Name Society's Name of the Year Award. They are popular enough to appear on merchandise like clothes, earrings, soft toys, and keychains, with crochet patterns for people to make their own tardigrades. The Dutch artist Arno Coenen created statues for St Eusebius' Church, Arnhem of microscopic organisms including a tardigrade and a coronavirus.

Milnesium tardigradum was voted the winner of The Guardian's "2025 invertebrate of the year" competition, from a shortlist of ten. The article describing the conclusion of the contest stated that the species had "endured all five previous planetary extinction events".

=== From science to popular culture ===
The 'Ripper' in Star Trek: Discovery is a recognisably tardigrade-like creature enlarged to monstrous size, with extraordinary capabilities said in the TV series to have been acquired by horizontal gene transfer.

The tardigrades' traits, including their ability to survive extreme conditions, have earned them a place in science fiction and other pop culture. The musician Cosmo Sheldrake imagines himself as a robust tardigrade in his 2015 "Tardigrade Song". He sings "If I were a tardigrade ... Pressure wouldn't squash me and fire couldn't burn ... I can live life in vacuums for years with no drink (A ha)".

The biologists Mark Blaxter and Kazuharu Arakawa describe tardigrades' transition to science fiction and fantasy as resulting in "rare but entertaining walk-on parts". They note that in the 2015 sci-fi horror film Harbinger Down, the protagonists have to deal with tardigrades that have mutated through Cold War experiments into intelligent and deadly shapeshifters.

In the 2017 Star Trek: Discovery, the alien "Ripper" creature is a huge but "generally recognisable" version of a terrestrial tardigrade. In the story, the Ripper "incorporate[s] foreign DNA into its own genome via horizontal gene transfer" from its symbiotic fungi. The scholar of science in popular culture Lisa Meinecke, in Fighting for the Future: Essays on Star Trek: Discovery, writes that the animal shares some of the real tardigrade's characteristics, including "its physical resilience to extreme environmental" stresses. She adds that while taking on fungal DNA is "ostensibly grounded" in science, it equally carries a "mystical impetus of what [the French philosophers] Deleuze and Guattari call a becoming", an entanglement of species that changes those involved "and ties together all life".

== See also ==
- List of tardigrades of South Africa
- Panspermia
