= List of tardigrades of South Africa =

List of recorded species of the tardigrade fauna of South Africa

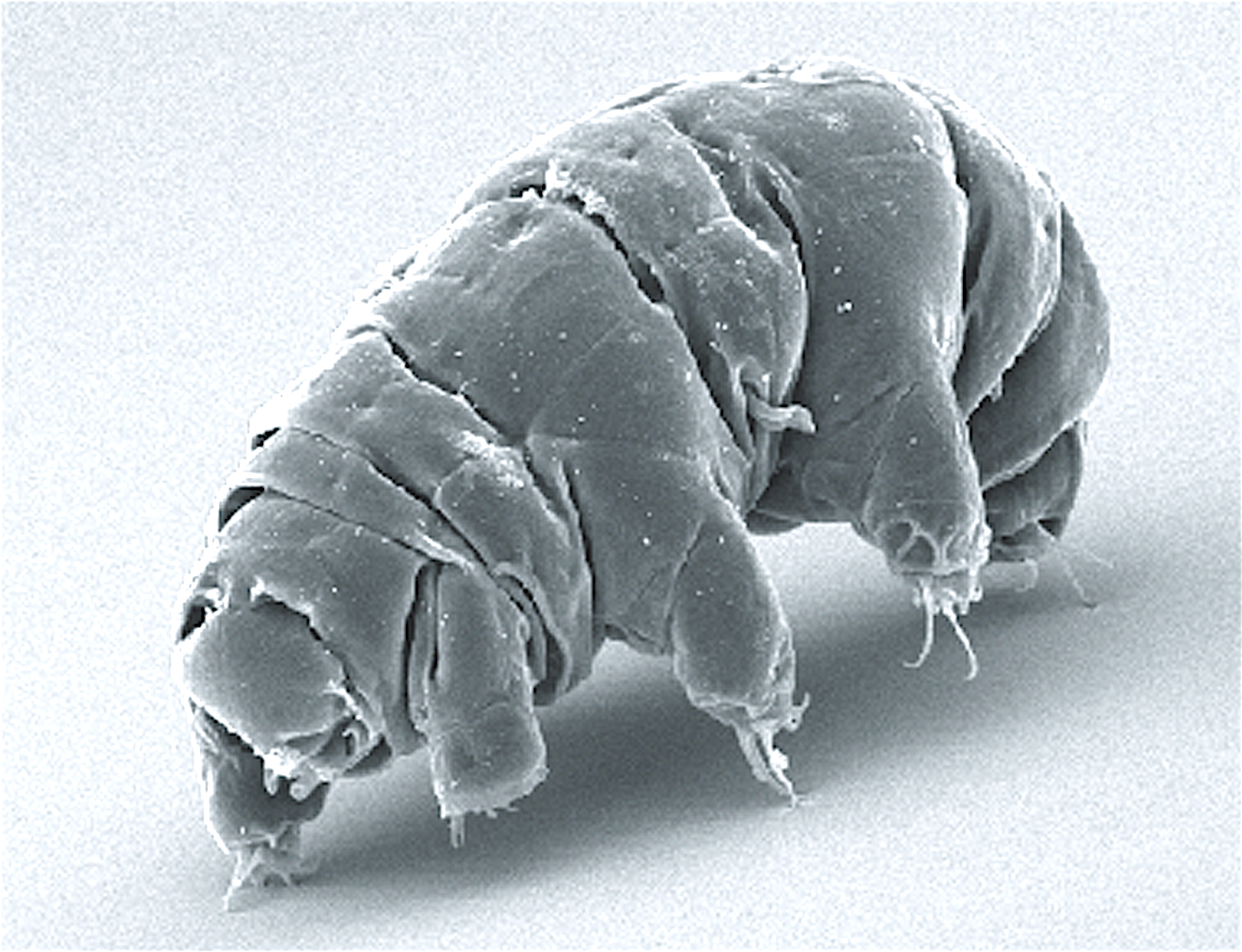
Milnesium tardigradum

The list of tardigrades of South Africa is a list of species that form a part of the phylum Tardigrada of the fauna of South Africa. The list follows the SANBI listing.

Tardigrades (/ˈtɑːrdɪɡreɪdz/), known colloquially as water bears or moss piglets, are a phylum of eight-legged segmented micro-animals. They were first described by the German zoologist Johann August Ephraim Goeze in 1773, who called them Kleiner Wasserbär 'little water bear'. In 1776, the Italian biologist Lazzaro Spallanzani named them Tardigrada, which means 'slow walkers'.

They live in diverse regions of Earth's biosphere – mountaintops, the deep sea, tropical rainforests, and the Antarctic. Tardigrades are among the most resilient animals known, with individual species able to survive extreme conditions – such as exposure to extreme temperatures, extreme pressures (both high and low), air deprivation, radiation, dehydration, and starvation – that would quickly kill most other forms of life. Tardigrades have survived exposure to outer space.

There are about 1,500 known species in the phylum Tardigrada, a part of the superphylum Ecdysozoa. The earliest known fossil is from the Cambrian, some 500 million years ago. They lack several of the Hox genes found in arthropods, and the middle region of the body corresponding to an arthropod's thorax and abdomen. Instead, most of their body is homologous to an arthropod's head.

Tardigrades are usually about 0.5 mm (0.02 in) long when fully grown. They are short and plump, with four pairs of legs, each ending in claws (usually four to eight) or sticky pads. Tardigrades are prevalent in mosses and lichens and can readily be collected and viewed under a low-power microscope, making them accessible to students and amateur scientists. Their clumsy crawling and their well-known ability to survive life-stopping events have brought them into science fiction and popular culture including items of clothing, statues, soft toys and crochet patterns. (Full article...)

Where common names are given, they are not necessarily the only common names in use for the species.

== Class Heterotardigrada ==
=== Order Echiniscoidea ===
==== Family Echiniscidae ====
Genus Echiniscus:

- Echiniscus africanus Murray, 1907
- Echiniscus arctomys Ehrenberg, 1853
- Echiniscus crassispinosus Murray, 1907
- Echiniscus duboisi Richters, 1902
- Echiniscus longispinosus Murray, 1907
- Echlniscus perarmatus Murray, 1907
- Echiuiscus pusae Marcus, 1928

Genus Pseudechiniscus:

- Pseudechiniscus bispinosus (Murray, 1907)
- Pseudechiniscus jiroveci Bartos, 1963
- Pseudechiniscus suillus Ehrenberg, 1853), syn. Echiniscus mutabilis Murray, 1905, Pseudechiniscus suillus suillus (Ehrenberg, 1853)

== Class Eutardigrada ==
=== Order Parachela ===
==== Family Hypsibiidae ====
Genus Doryphoribius:

- Doryphoribius flavus (Iharos, 1966), syn. Doryphoribius citrinus, (Maucci, 1972), Hypsibius citrinus Maucci, 1973

Genus Hypsibius:

- Hypsibius convergens (Urbanowicz, 1925), syn. Macrobiotus convergens Urbanowicz, 1925
- Hypsibius dujardini (Doyère, 1840), syn. Hypsibius lacustris (Doyère, 1851), Macrobiotus dujardin Doyère, 1840, Macrobiotus dujardini Doyère, 1840, Macrobiotus samoanus Richters, 1908
- Hypsibius maculatus (Iharos, 1969)

Genus Isohypsibius:

- Isohypsibius deconincki Pilato, 1971
- Isohypsibius nodosus (Murray, 1907), syn. Hypsibius nodosus (Murray, 1907), Macrobiotus nodosus Murray, 1907
- Isohypsibius sattleri (Richters, 1902), syn. Hypsibius bakonyiensis Iharos, 1964, Hypsibius sattleri (Richters, 1902), Isohypsibius bakonyiensis (Iharos, 1964), Macrobiotus sattleri Richters, 1902

Genus Ramazzottius:

- Ramazzottius szeptycki (Dastych, 1980), syn. Hypsibius szeptycki Dastych, 1980, Ramazzottius szepticki (Dastych, 1980)
- Ramazzottius theroni Dastych, 1983

Genus Diphascon:

- Diphascon scoticum Murray, 1905, syn. Adropion scoticum Murray, 1905, Hypsibius scoticus (Murray, 1905)
- Diphascon zaniewi Kaczmarek & Michalczyk, 2004

Genus Paradiphascon:

- Paradiphascon manningi Dastych, 1992

Genus Astatumen:

- Astatumen trinacriae (Arcidiacono, 1962), syn. Astatumen ramazzottii (Iharos, 1966), Itaquascon ramazzottii Iharos, 1966, Itaquascon trinacriae Arcidiacono, 1962

==== Family Calohypsibiidae ====
Genus Haplomacrobiotus:

- Haplomacrobiotus seductor Pilato & Beasley, 1987

==== Family Macrobiotidae ====
Genus Calcarobiotus:

- Calcarobiotus filmeri Dastych, 1993
- Calcarobiotus occultus Dastych, 1993

Genus Macrobiotus:

- Macrobiotus drakensbergi Dastych, 1993
- Macrobiotus echinogenitus Richters, 1904
- Macrobiotus furciger Murray, 1906, syn. Macrobiotus furciger Murray, 1907
- Macrobiotus hufelandi C.A.S. Schultze, 1834, syn. Macrobiotus eminens Ehrenberg, 1895, Macrobiotus hufelandii C.A.S. Schultze, 1834, Macrobiotus interruptus Della Valle, 1914
- Macrobiotus nuragicus Pilato & Sperlinga, 1975
- Macrobiotus richtersi Murray, 1911
- Macrobiotus iharosi Pilato, Binda & Catanzaro, 1991
- Macrobiotus crassidens (Murray, 1907)

Genus Minibiotus:

- Minibiotus hufelandioides (Murray, 1910), syn. Macrobiotus hufelandioides Murray, 1910
- Minibiotus intermedius (Plate, 1888), syn. Macrobiotus intermedius Plate, 1889, Macrobiotus intermedius intermedius Plate, 1889

=== Order Apochela ===
==== Family Milnesiidae ====
Genus Milnesium:

- Milnesium tardigradum Doyère, 1840, syn. Arcrophanes schlagintweitii Ehrenberg, 1859, Arctiscon tardigradum Schrank, 1803
