= Parking lot (disambiguation) =

A parking lot is a cleared area that is intended for parking vehicles.

Parking lot or minor variations thereof may also refer to:

- Green parking lot, a form of parking lot designed to be environmentally more sustainable
- The Parking Lot Movie, a 2010 documentary film
- Parking Lots (album), a 2005 album by Mia Dyson
- "Parking Lot" (Nelly Furtado song), a 2012 single by Nelly Furtado
- "Parking Lot" (Blink-182 song), a 2017 promotional single by Blink-182
- "Parking Lot" (Mustard and Travis Scott song), a 2024 single by Mustard and Travis Scott
- "Parking Lot (skit)", a skit by Eminem from the 2013 album The Marshall Mathers LP 2
- "Parking Lot", a song by Nivea from the 2005 album Complicated
- "Parking Lot", a song by Tyler, the Creator from the 2013 album Wolf
