= P. manningi =

P. manningi may refer to:

- Paradiphascon manningi, a species of tardigrade in the family Hypsibiidae
- Paralomis manningi, a species of king crab
