= Paramacrobiotus pius =

Scientific classification
- Kingdom: Animalia
- Phylum: Tardigrada
- Class: Eutardigrada
- Order: Parachela
- Family: Macrobiotidae
- Genus: Paramacrobiotus
- Species: P. pius

Binomial name
- Paramacrobiotus pius Lisi, Binda & Pilato, 2016

Species of tardigrade

Paramacrobiotus pius is a species of tardigrade in the family Macrobiotidae. It was formally described in 2016, and is known only from Gangi, Sicily, Italy.

== Taxonomy and etymology ==
The type specimens of Paramacrobiotus pius were collected in 2002 by Giovanni Pilato and Maria Grazia Binda, but it was not until 2016 that they and Oscar Lisi described the species. They gave it the specific name pius (which means "holy, devoutly religious") because it was discovered near the very old former monastery of Gangivecchio.

== Description ==
The species is colorless, and the holotype is 270 microns long.

With the exception of minute dots on the legs, Paramacrobiotus pius has a smooth cuticle with no eye spots. The inside of the pharynx contains four placoids (thickened pieces of cuticle that provide structural support). Three of them are similarly sized macroplacoids that are less than 43.5% as long as the buccal tube. The fourth placoid is a microplacoid which is some length from the third macroplacoid. Each leg has two claws, with those closer to the center shorter than those on the outside. These claws are thin, and all of their primary branches have thin points and smooth lunules at their base which are more developed on the back legs.

The eggs are freely laid and are covered with areolae and a mesh of outgrowths that are shaped like trunks or cones, each with a small spine at the end. The eggs range from 82 to 88 microns in diameter, or 105 to 111 when these outgrowths are counted.

== Habitat and distribution ==
Paramacrobiotus pius is only known from Gangi, Sicilly. The type specimens were collected from moss growing on stone at an elevation of 850 meters.
