= Mesobiotus =

Scientific classification
- Domain: Eukaryota
- Kingdom: Animalia
- Phylum: Tardigrada
- Class: Eutardigrada
- Order: Parachela
- Family: Macrobiotidae
- Genus: Mesobiotus; Vecchi, Cesari, Bertolani, Jönsson, Rebecchi & Guidetti, 2016

Genus of tardigrades

Mesobiotus is a genus of tardigrades belonging to the family Macrobiotidae.

== Species ==
According to the 42nd edition of Actual checklist of Tardigrada species, the genus contains the following species:

- Mesobiotus altitudinalis (Biserov, 1997-1998)
- Mesobiotus anastasiae (Tumanov, 2020)
- Mesobiotus aradasi (Binda, Pilato & Lisi, 2005)
- Mesobiotus arguei (Pilato & Sperlinga, 1975)
- Mesobiotus armatus (Pilato & Binda, 1996)
- Mesobiotus australis (Pilato & D'Urso, 1976)
- Mesobiotus baltatus (McInnes, 1991)
- Mesobiotus barabanovi (Tumanov, 2005)
- Mesobiotus barbarae (Kaczmarek, Michalczyk & Degma, 2007)
- Mesobiotus binieki (Kaczmarek, Gołdyn, Prokop & Michalczyk, 2011)
- Mesobiotus blocki (Dastych, 1984)
- Mesobiotus contii (Pilato & Lisi, 2006)
- Mesobiotus coronatus (de Barros, 1942)
- Mesobiotus creber (Pilato & Lisi, 2009)
- Mesobiotus datanlanicus (Stec, 2019)
- Mesobiotus diegoi (Stec, 2022)
- Mesobiotus diffusus (Binda & Pilato, 1987)
- Mesobiotus diguensis (Pilato & Lisi, 2009)
- Mesobiotus dilimanensis (Itang, Stec, Mapalo, Mirano-Bascos & Michalczyk, 2020)
- Mesobiotus dimentmani (Pilato, Lisi & Binda, 2010)
- Mesobiotus divergens (Binda, Pilato & Lisi, 2005)
- Mesobiotus emiliae (Massa, Guidetti, Cesari, Rebecchi & Jönsson, 2021)
- Mesobiotus erminiae (Binda & Pilato, 1999)
- Mesobiotus ethiopicus (Stec & Kristensen, 2017)
- Mesobiotus fiedleri (Kaczmarek, Bartylak, Stec, Kulpa, M. Kepel, A. Kepel & Roszkowska, 2020)
- Mesobiotus furciger (Murray, 1907)
- Mesobiotus harmsworthi (Murray, 1907)
- Mesobiotus helenae (Tumanov & Pilato, 2019)
- Mesobiotus hieronimi (Pilato & Claxton, 1988)
- Mesobiotus hilariae (Vecchi, Cesari, Bertolani, Jönsson, Rebecchi & Guidetti, 2016)
- Mesobiotus imperialis (Stec, 2021)
- Mesobiotus insanis (Mapalo, Stec, Mirano-Bascos & Michalczyk, 2017)
- Mesobiotus insuetus (Pilato, Sabella & Lisi, 2014)
- Mesobiotus joenssoni (Guidetti, Gneuss, Cesari, Altiero & Schill, 2020)
- Mesobiotus kovalevi (Tumanov, 2004)
- Mesobiotus krynauwi (Dastych & Harris, 1995)
- Mesobiotus liviae (Ramazzotti, 1962)
- Mesobiotus lusitanicus (Maucci & Durante Pasa, 1984)
- Mesobiotus maklowiczi (Stec 2022)
- Mesobiotus marmoreus (Stec, 2021)
- Mesobiotus mauccii (Pilato, 1974)
- Mesobiotus meridionalis (Richters, 1909)
- Mesobiotus montanus (Murray, 1910)
- Mesobiotus mottai (Binda & Pilato, 1994)
- Mesobiotus neuquensis (Rossi, Claps & Ardohain, 2009)
- Mesobiotus nikolaevae (Tumanov, 2018)
- Mesobiotus nuragicus (Pilato & Sperlinga, 1975)
- Mesobiotus occultatus (Kaczmarek, Zawierucha, Buda, Stec, Gawlak, Michalczyk & Roszkowska, 2018)
- Mesobiotus orcadensis (Murray, 1907)
- Mesobiotus ovostriatus (Pilato & Patanè, 1998)
- Mesobiotus patiens (Pilato, Binda, Napolitano & Moncada, 2000)
- Mesobiotus perfidus (Pilato & Lisi, 2009)
- Mesobiotus peterseni (Maucci, 1991)
- Mesobiotus philippinicus (Mapalo, Stec, Mirano-Bascos & Michalczyk, 2016)
- Mesobiotus pilatoi (Binda & Rebecchi, 1992)
- Mesobiotus polaris (Murray, 1910)
- Mesobiotus pseudoblocki (Roszkowska, Stec, Ciobanu & Kaczmarek, 2016)
- Mesobiotus pseudocoronatus (Pilato, Binda & Lisi, 2006)
- Mesobiotus pseudoliviae (Pilato & Binda, 1996)
- Mesobiotus pseudonuragicus (Pilato, Binda & Lisi, 2004)
- Mesobiotus pseudopatiens (Kaczmarek & Roszkowska, 2016)
- Mesobiotus radiatus (Pilato, Binda & Catanzaro, 1991)
- Mesobiotus reinhardti (Michalczyk & Kaczmarek, 2003)
- Mesobiotus rigidus (Pilato & Lisi, 2006)
- Mesobiotus romani (Roszkowska, Stec, Gawlak & Kaczmarek, 2018)
- Mesobiotus siamensis (Tumanov, 2006)
- Mesobiotus sicheli (Binda, Pilato & Lisi, 2005)
- Mesobiotus simulans (Pilato, Binda, Napolitano & Moncada, 2000)
- Mesobiotus skorackii (Kaczmarek, Zawierucha, Buda, Stec, Gawlak, Michalczyk & Roszkowska, 2018)
- Mesobiotus snaresensis (Horning, Schuster & Grigarick, 1978)
- Mesobiotus stellaris (du Bois-Reymond Marcus, 1944)
- Mesobiotus szeptyckii (Kaczmarek & Michalczyk, 2009)
- Mesobiotus tehuelchensis (Rossi, Claps & Ardohain, 2009)
- Mesobiotus wuzhishanensis (Yin, Wang & Li, 2011)
- Mesobiotus zhejiangensis (Yin, Wang & Li, 2011)

== Original publication ==
- Vecchi, Cesari, Bertolani, Jönsson, Rebecchi & Guidetti, 2016 : Integrative systematic studies on tardigrades from Antarctica identify new genera and new species within Macrobiotoidea and Echiniscoidea. Invertebrate Systematics, vol. 30, No. 4, p. 303-322.
