= Parking lot =

Cleared area for parking vehicles

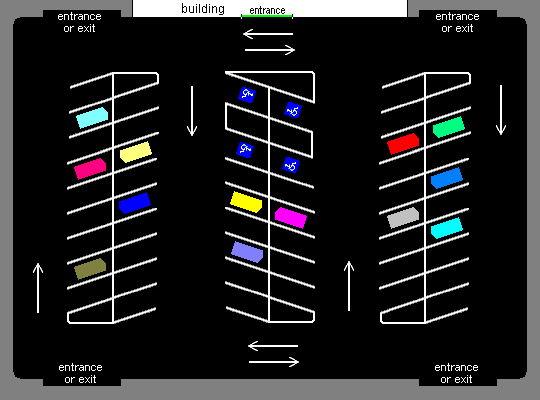
Diagram of example parking lot layout with angle parking as seen from above

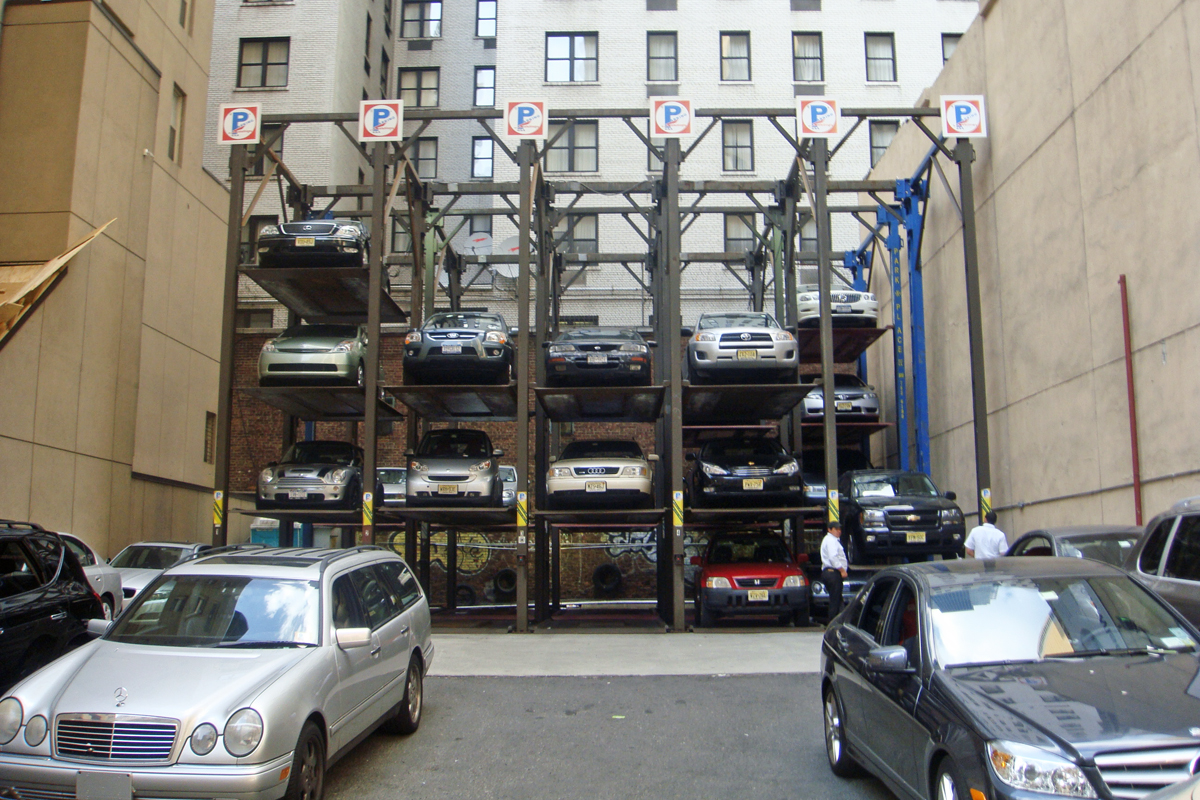
A parking lot in Manhattan, New York City, in 2010, with its capacity increased through multiple level stacked parking using mechanical lifts

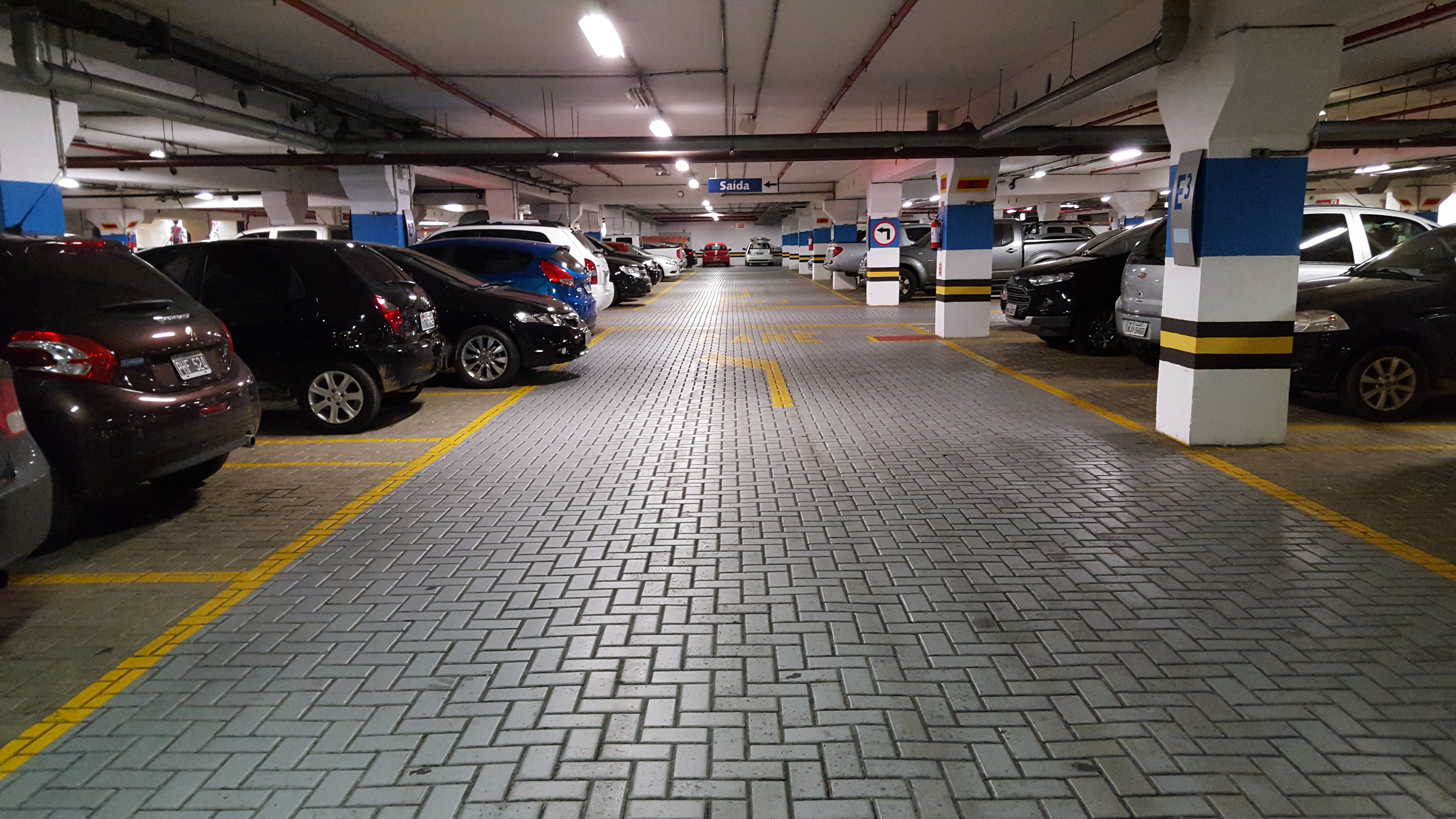
A subterranean parking lot of a Brazilian shopping mall taken in 2016

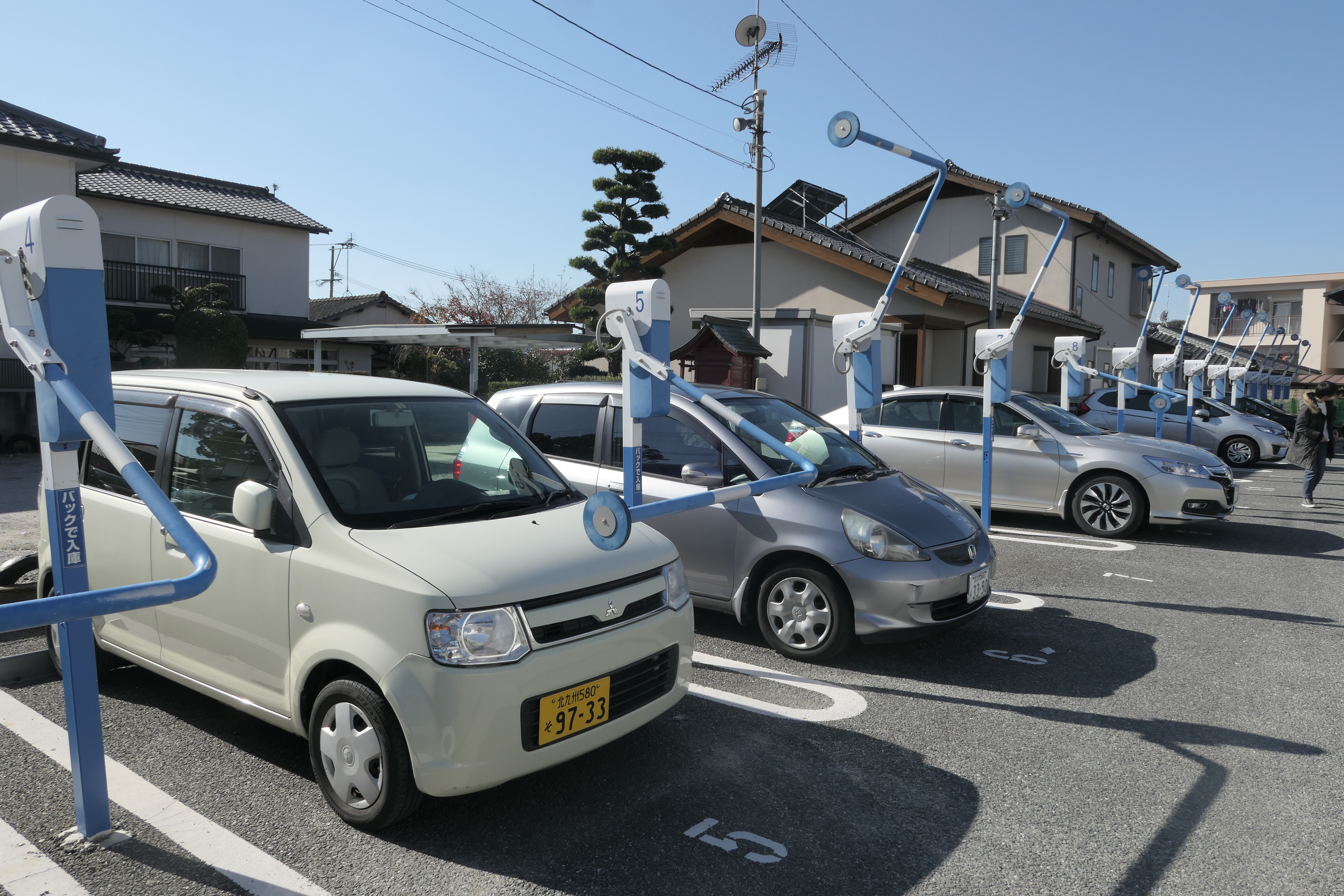
Car park with drop arm in Dazaifu, Fukuoka

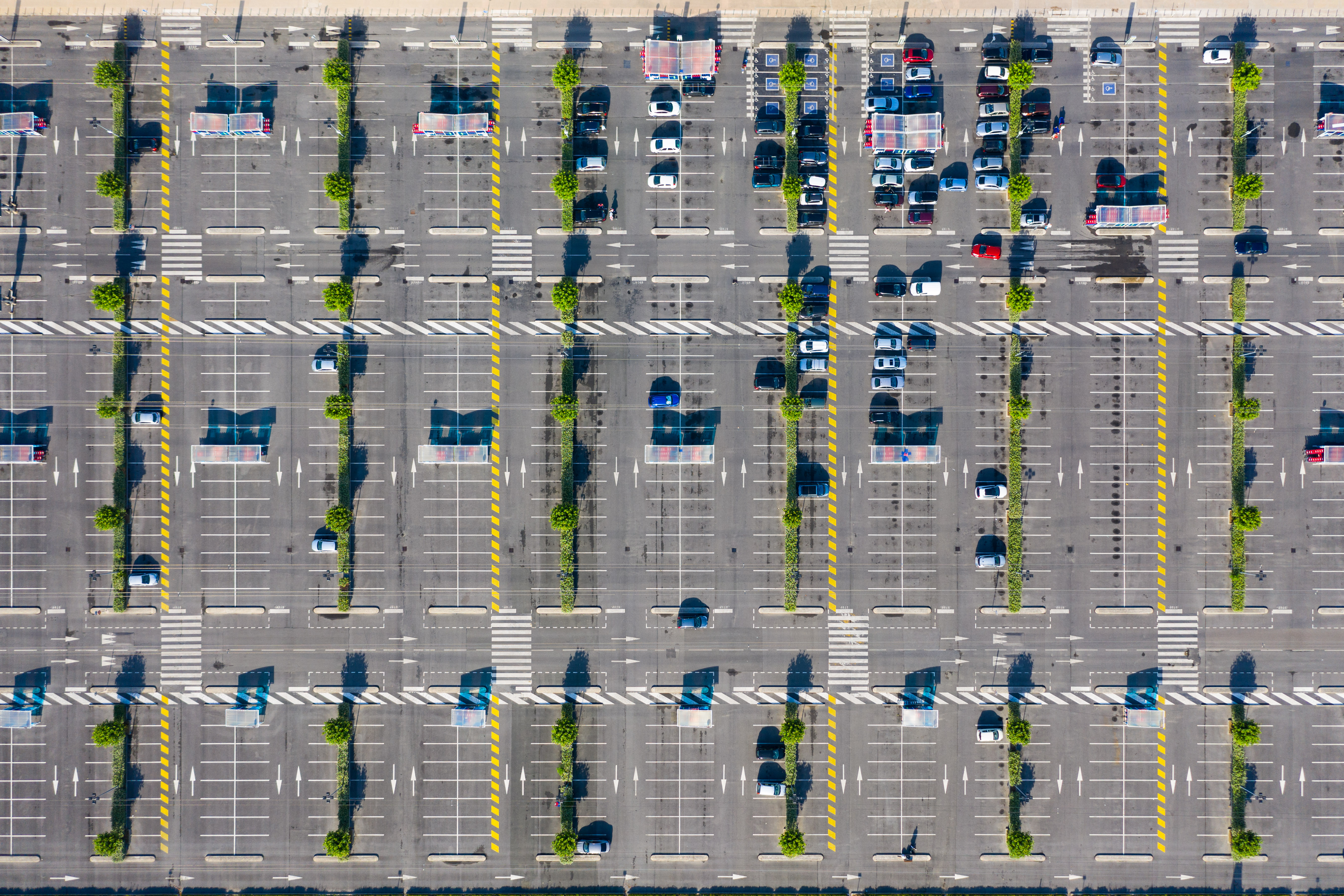
Parking lot outside of a shopping mall in Collégien, France, demonstrating the design of prioritizing spaces for cars over spaces for people

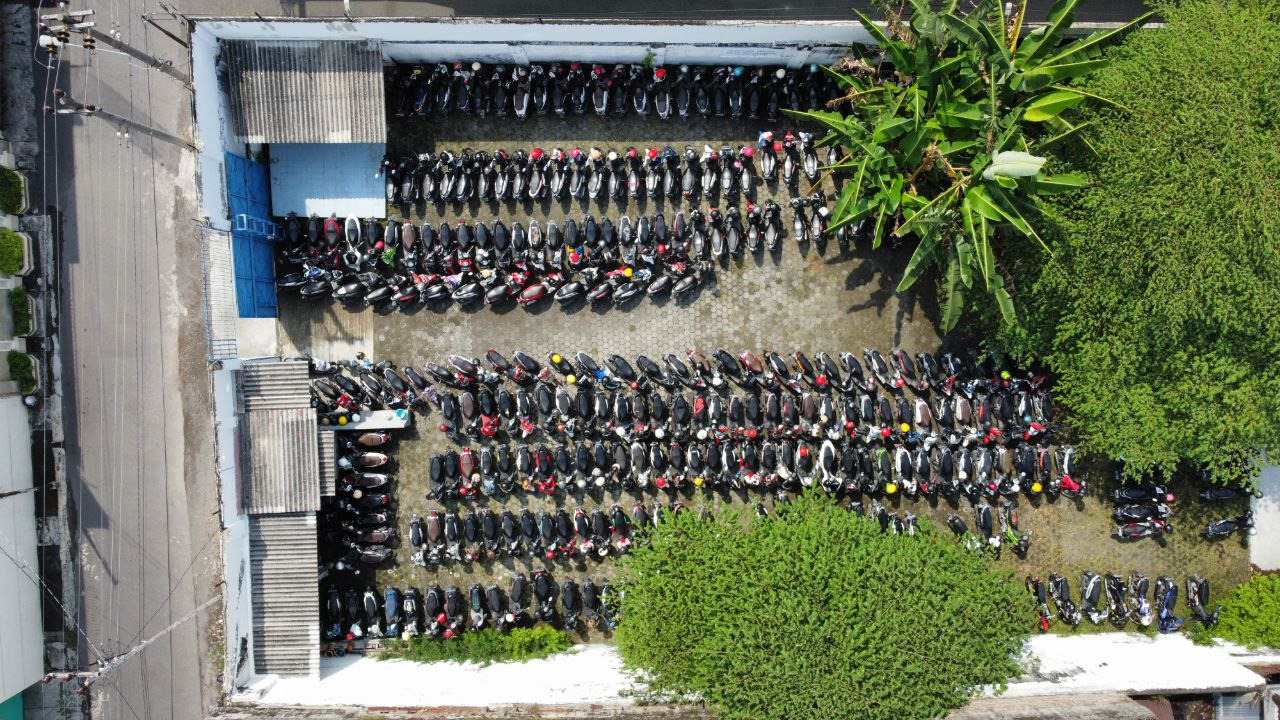
Motorcycle parking lot in Surakarta, Indonesia

A parking lot (North American English) or car park (British English), also known as a car lot, is an area designated for parking spaces for a large number of automobiles. The term usually refers to paved land with surface markings dedicated only for parking privately owned vehicles, and may or may not require the driver to pay a fee and/or display a ticket in order to use the facility. In most jurisdictions where private motor vehicles are the dominant mode of transportation, parking lots are a major infrastructure of cities and suburban areas. Shopping malls, sports venues, parks and resorts, and other similar facilities that expect significant patronage often have immense parking lots. Some parking lots are built as low-rise buildings — i.e., multistory parking garages — to maximize the usable area ratio for a given plot of land.

Parking lots tend to be sources of water pollution because of their extensive impervious surfaces, and because most have limited or no facilities to control urban runoff. Many areas today also require minimum landscaping in parking lots to provide shade and to help mitigate the extent of which their paved surfaces contribute to heat islands. Many municipalities require minimum numbers of parking spaces for buildings such as stores (by floor area) and apartment complexes (by number of bedrooms). In the United States, each state's department of transportation requires a fraction of lot spaces to be reserved for people holding a disabled parking permit. Modern parking lots use various technologies to enable motorists to pay parking fees, help them find unoccupied spaces and retrieve their vehicles, and otherwise improve their parking experiences.

== Planning and economics ==
A 2015 study of US parking lots found that the average cost of construction, excluding the cost of the land purchase, was about US$24000 per space for a surface lot and US$34000 per space for an underground lot. Donald Shoup, professor of urban planning at the University of California, Los Angeles, estimated in 2023 that the United States had between 700 million and 2 billion parking spaces overall, amounting to 2.5 to 7.0 spaces per car.

The effect of large-scale in-city parking has long been contentious. The replacement of historic structures by garages and lots has led to historical preservation movements in many cities. The massive acreage devoted to parking is widely seen as disruptive to the walkable urban fabric, maximizing convenience to each individual building but hampering foot traffic between them. Large paved areas have been called "parking craters", "parking deserts", and similar terms, emphasizing their "depopulated" nature and the barriers they can create to walking movement.

=== Parking minimums and maximums ===
Urban planning policies such as parking minimums and maximums can influence the size of private parking lots.

=== Criticism ===
Due to a recent trend towards more livable and walkable communities, parking minimums (policies requiring each building to have a minimum number of parking spaces) have been criticized by both livable streets advocates and developers alike. For a time, the British government recommended that local councils should establish maximum parking standards to discourage car use. American cities such as Washington, DC, are now considering removing parking minimums as a way to add more housing for residents while encouraging the use of public transit. Parking lots designed specifically for bicycle parking are also becoming more prevalent in response to increased environmental and health consciousness. These may include bicycle parking racks and locks, as well as more modern technologies for security and convenience. For instance, a growing number of bicycle parking lots in Tokyo include automated parking systems.

Efforts to reduce the amount of space dedicated to parking lots for diminishing the dependence on cars, has been taken in Beijing, Mexico City, Delhi and different cities in California. The US cities of Portland, Minneapolis, and Austin abolished the requirement for parking minima. As of 2023, Austin (Texas) is the biggest city in the US that has done so—to encourage walking, biking, public transit, lowering the cost of housing, and increasing the amount of housing units that can be built in the city territory.

== Legal issues ==
Universal sign for disabled parking

=== Sweden and Denmark ===
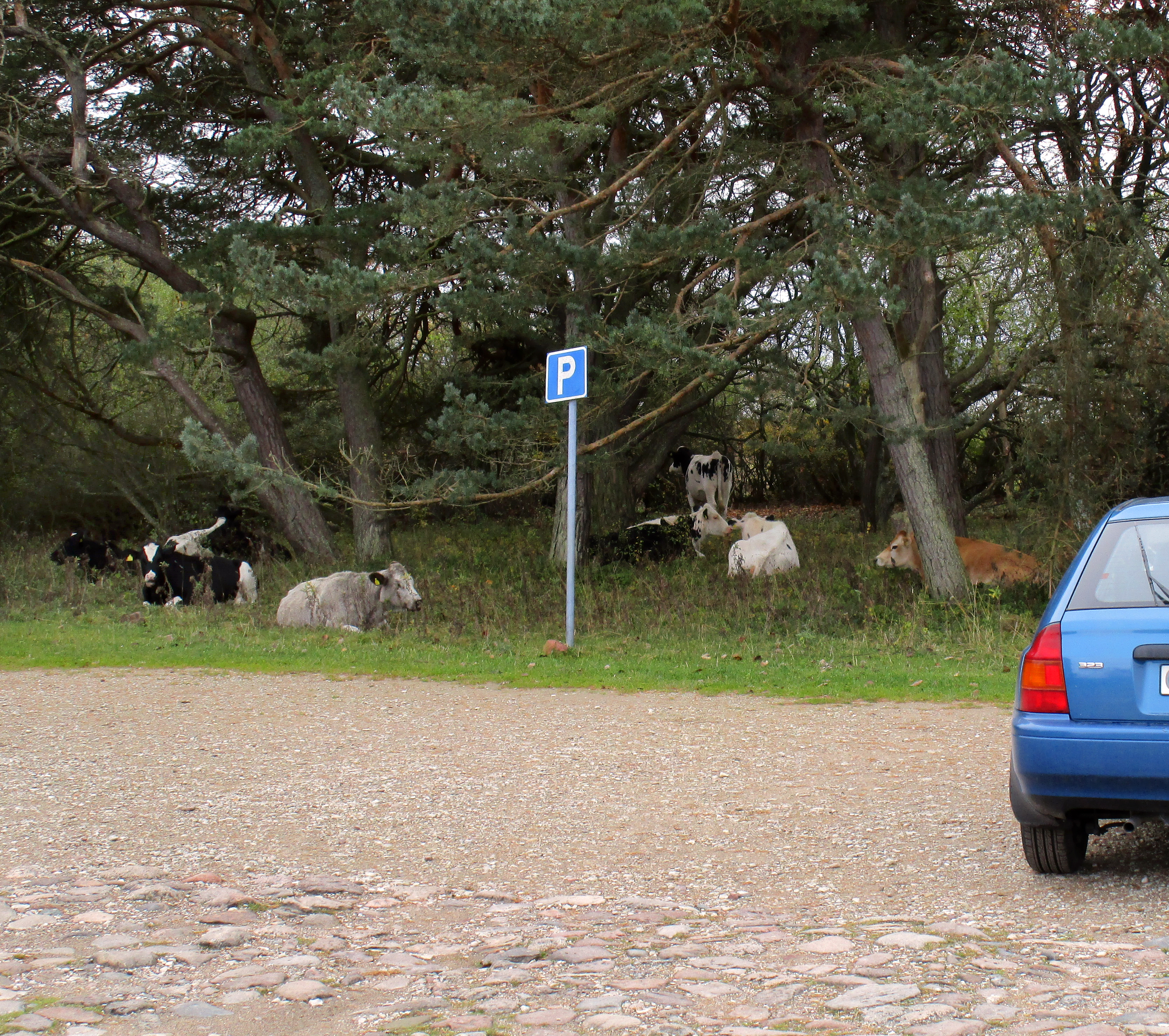
Rural parking lot, Gotland, Sweden

In Sweden and Denmark, there are legally two types of car parking, either on streets and roads, or on private land. A parking violation on streets is a traffic crime, resulting in fines. A parking violation on private land (also if owned by the city) is a contract violation and gives an additional parking fee (Swedish: kontrollavgift = check fee). The difference is small for the car owner, and the owner is always responsible.

=== United Kingdom ===
The United Kingdom has two types of car parking: either on public or on private land. The police will investigate any reported accident on public land, but have no legal obligation and will not do so on private land. Public road is defined by the Road Traffic Act 1972 and the Road Traffic Act 1972 (Amendment) Regulations 1988 (SI 1988/1036) as: "Road", in relation to England and Wales, means any highway and any other road to which the public has access, and includes bridges over which a road passes. There is also a House of Lords judgment on this matter.

Civil enforcement officers enforce parking restrictions on public, council-run car parks. These include failure to purchase a ticket as payment (if available)/not parking in a marked bay/other offences.

=== United States ===
In the United States, each state's Department of Transportation sets the proper ratio for disabled spaces for private businesses and public parking lots. Certain circumstances may demand more designated spaces. These reserved spaces are mandated by the Americans with Disabilities Act Accessibility Guidelines.

== Payment ==
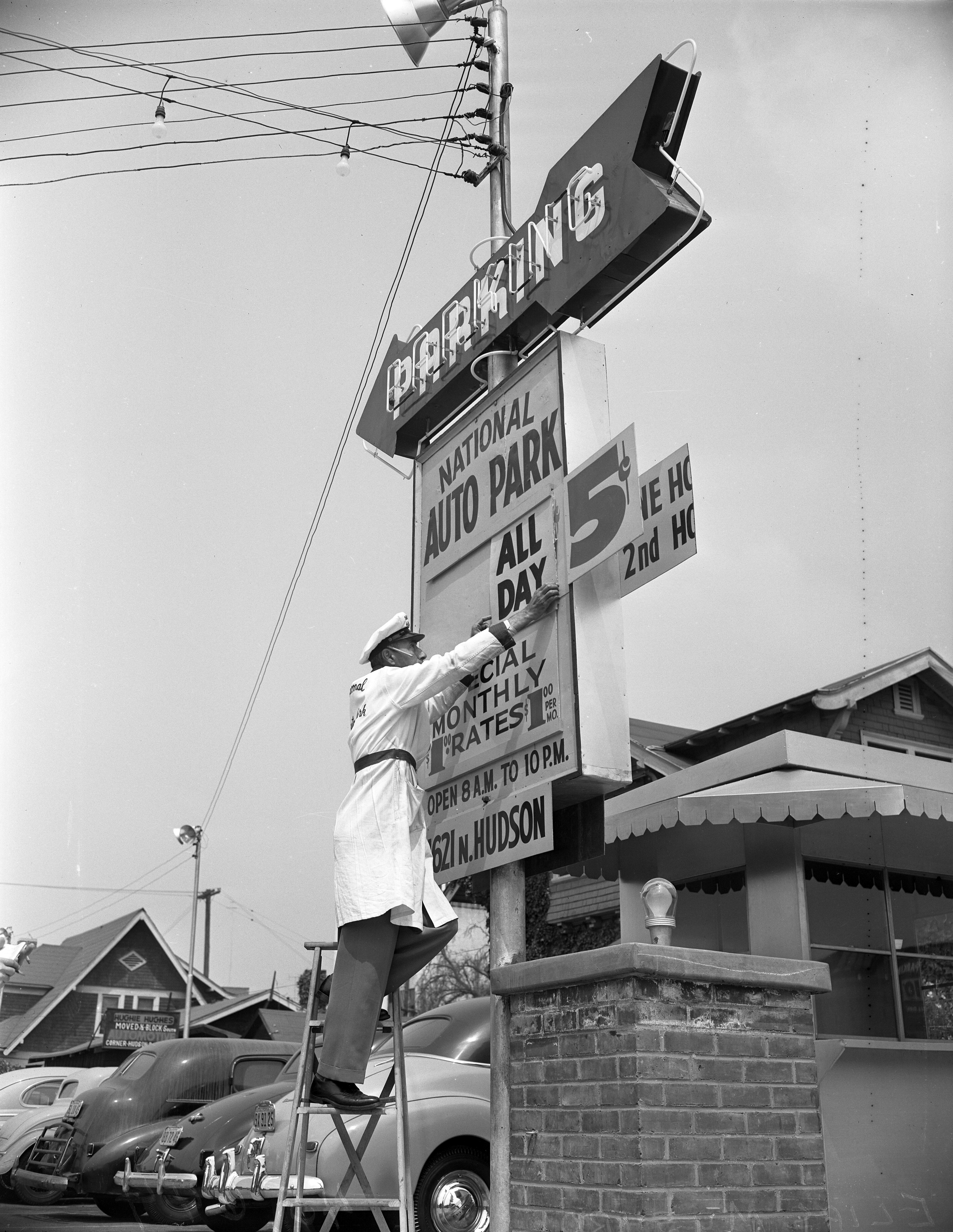
Parking, 5 cents a day, Hollywood, United States, 1949

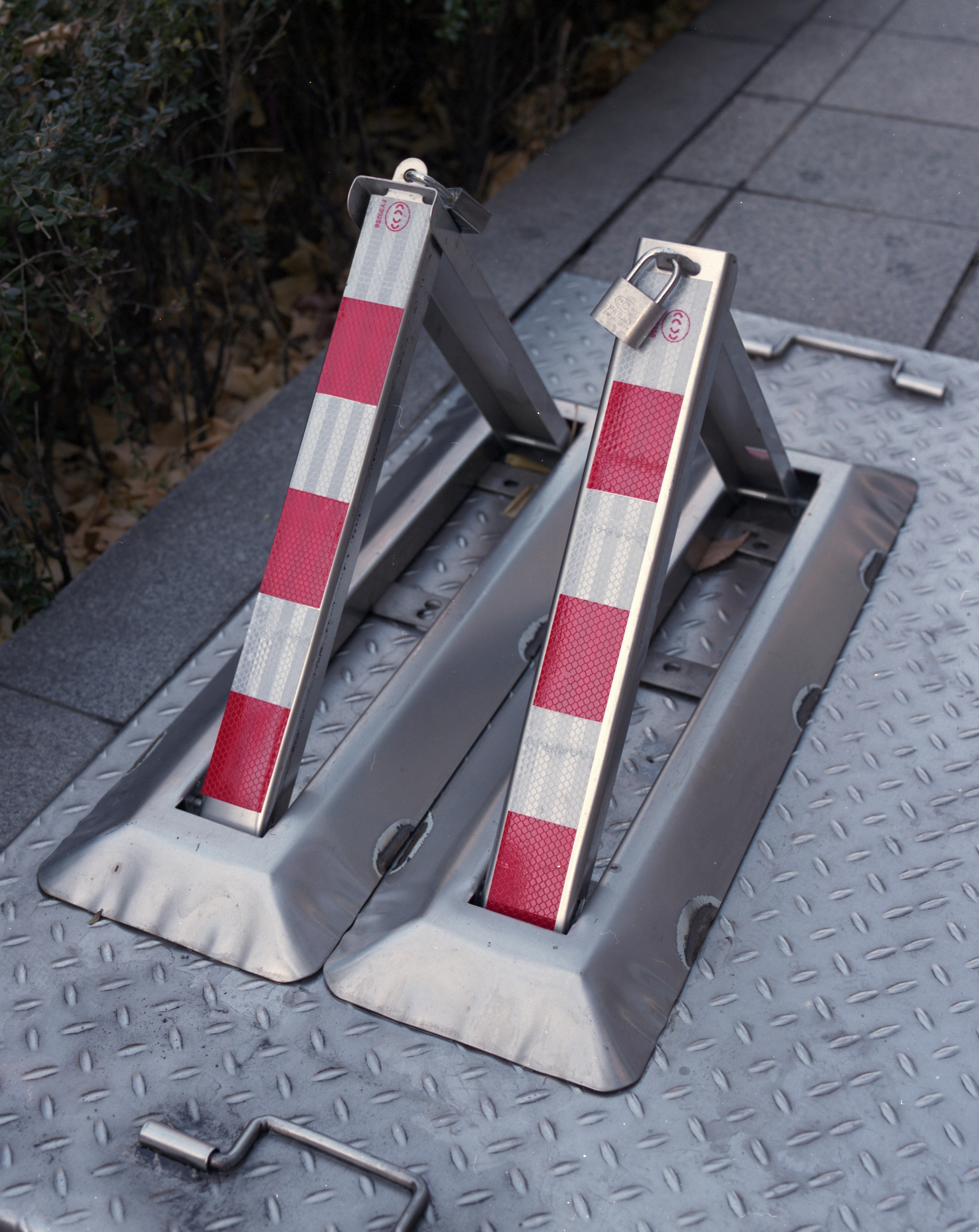
Barriers can be installed so that parking is not possible without payment.

Various forms of technology are used to charge motorists for the use of a parking lot.

Boom gates are used in many parking lots. A customer arrives at the entry ticket machine by vehicle, presses the ticket request push button, takes a ticket - which raises the barrier - and enters the parking lot. To exit the lot, the customer presents the ticket to a cashier in a booth at the exit and tenders payment, after which the cashier opens the boom gate.

In 1954, the first automated parking lots were built where, for a monthly fee, a driver with a magnetic key card could enter and exit the parking lot by raising and lowering the boom.

A more modern system uses automatic pay stations, where the driver presents the ticket and pays the fee required before returning to their car, then drives to the exit terminal and presents the ticket. If the ticket has not been paid for, the boom barrier will not raise, which will force the customer to either press the intercom and speak to a staff member, or reverse out to pay at the pay station or cashier booth.

At some major airports' parking lots in the United States, a driver can choose to swipe a credit card at the entry ticket dispenser instead of taking a ticket. When the driver swipes the same credit card at the exit terminal upon leaving the lot, the applicable parking fee is automatically calculated and charged to the credit card used.

In some parking lots, drivers present their tickets to and pay the cashiers at a separate cashier's office or counter (which are often located elsewhere from the entrances and exits of carparks). Such cashier's offices are called shroff offices or simply shroff in some parking lots in Hong Kong and other parts of East Asia influenced by the Hong Kong usage. If a ticket has not been paid, the barrier will not raise. In recent years, cashiers and shroff officers have often been replaced with automated machines. Another variant of payment has motorists paying an attendant on entry to the lot, with the way out guarded by a one-way spike strip that will only allow cars to exit.

Parking meters can also be used, with motorists paying in advance for the time required for the bay they are parked in. Pango (a play on "pay and go"), a company founded in Israel in 2007, created a mobile app that allows users to both find and pay for available metered parking; the app can also be used to pay for garage parking. Users' accounts are linked to a payment method, and the system remembers where a vehicle is parked and allows users to share a parking session with Facebook friends. Users may also, for a nominal monthly fee per registered car, subscribe to reminders that text alerts shortly before metered time expires, and in some municipalities, users may buy additional metered time via cellphone. Philadelphia encourages parking space turnover by charging escalating parking fees when metered time is added. Another app, Streetline, whose primary purpose is to help motorists find open parking spots using their smartphones, includes a timer, so users can get back to a parking meter before it expires, and a filter that lets users choose between on-street and off-street parking spaces; it also connects to the phone's camera so a user can take a photograph of their car.

Other lots operate on a pay and display system, where a ticket is purchased from a ticket machine and then placed on the dashboard of the car. Parking enforcement officers patrol the lot to ensure compliance with the requirement.

Similar to this is the system where the parking is paid by the mobile phone by sending an SMS message which contains the license plate number. In this case, the virtual cashier books the car and the time when the message is sent, and later, a new SMS message must be sent whenever the time is due. The actual payment is then made via the mobile phone bill.

Since 1978 in the United Kingdom, it has been possible to pre-book parking with specialist companies, such as BCP. This is prevalent at all airports, major ports, and cities.

== Technology ==
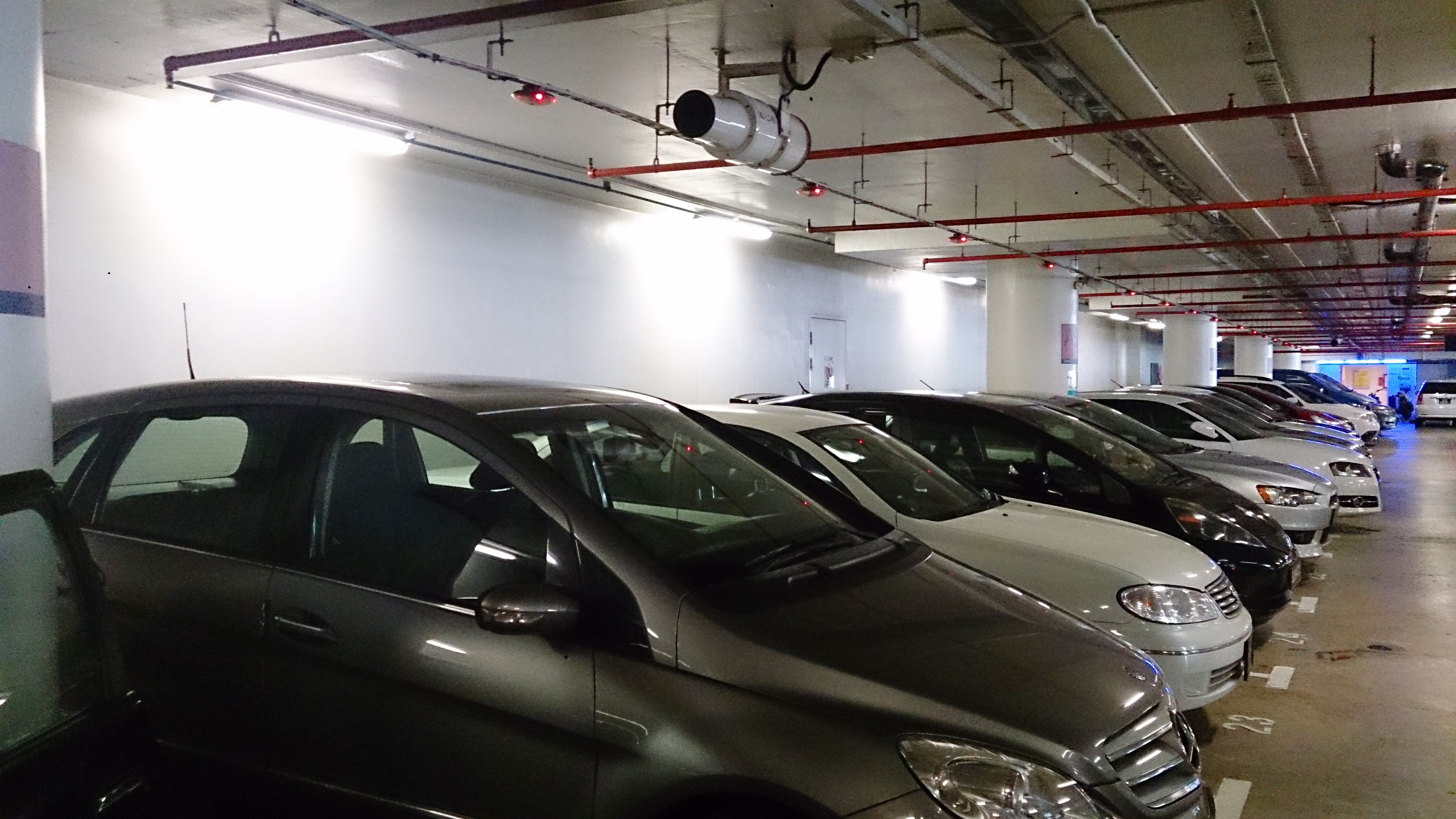
Sensors above each lot in this indoor parking lot determine if a car has already taken the spot.

Modern parking lots use a variety of technologies to help motorists find unoccupied parking spaces using parking guidance and information system, retrieve their vehicles, and improve their experience. This includes adaptive lighting, sensors, indoor positioning system (IPS) and mobile payment options. The Santa Monica Place shopping mall in California has cameras on each stall that can help count the lot occupancy and find lost cars.

In outdoor parking lots, GPS can be used to remember the location of a vehicle (some apps saves location automatically when turning off the car when a smartphone breaks communication with a vehicle's Bluetooth connection). In indoor parking lots, one option is to record one's Wi-Fi signature (signal strengths observed for several detectable access points) to remember the location of a vehicle. Another alternative is to use smartphone applications that does inertial dead reckoning, detection of turns made by the car while driving indoor, correlations of travel time between turns, and machine learning algorithms, to infer the rough location of the parked car based on a map or floorplan.

Online booking technology service providers have been created to help drivers find long-term parking in an automated manner, while also providing significant savings for those who book parking spaces ahead of time. They use real-time inventory management checking technology to display parking lots with availability, sorted by price and distance from the airport.

There are mobile apps providing services for the reservation of long-term parking lot spaces, similar to online or aggregate parking facility booking services. Some long-term parking mobile apps also have turn-by-turn maps to locate the parking lot, notably US and UK based ParkJockey.

=== Solar canopy parking lots ===
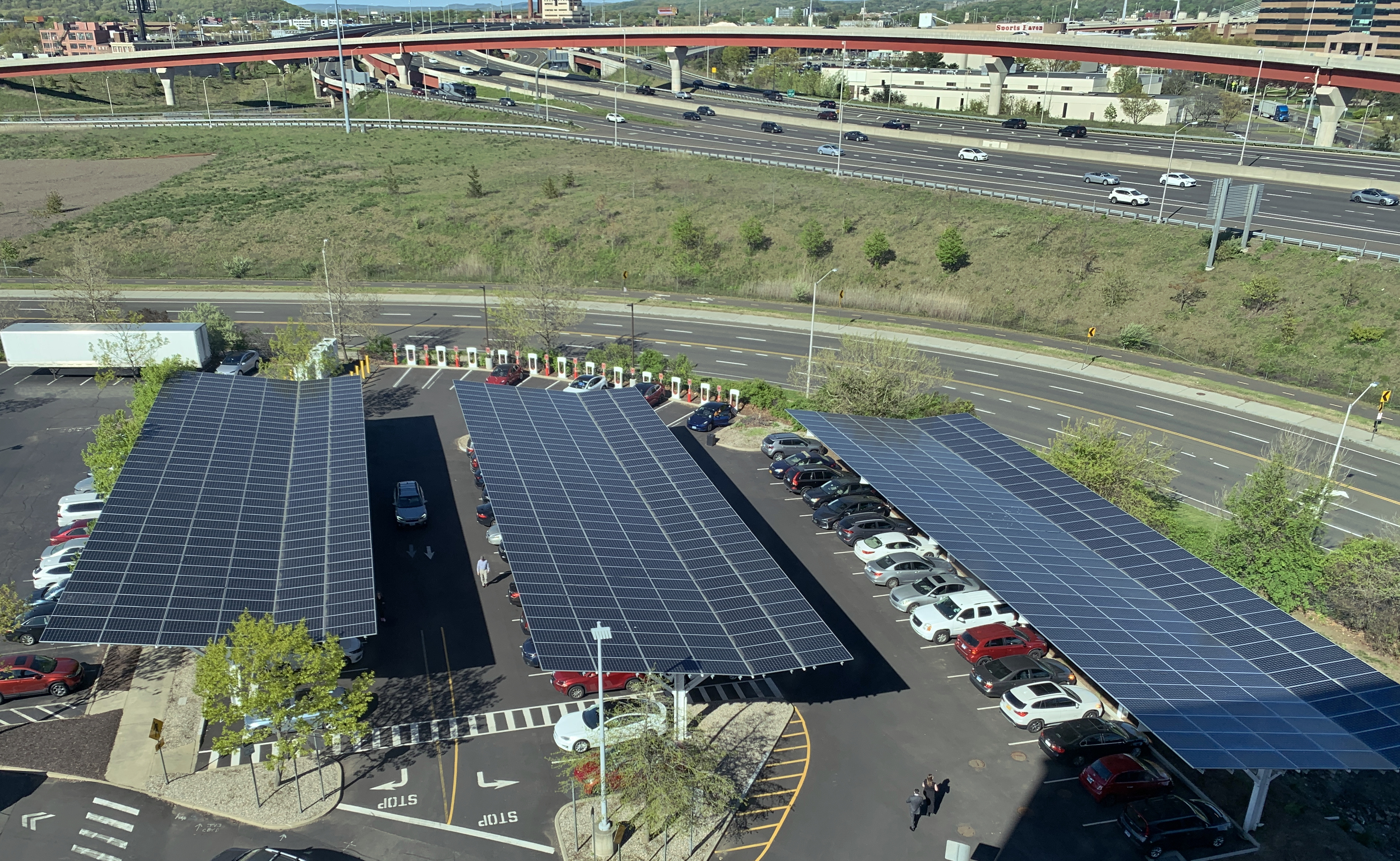
Solar canopy parking lot in New Haven at Hotel Marcel. There are EV level 2 chargers underneath the canopy and a 12-stall Tesla Supercharger behind.

Solar canopy parking lots are solar arrays installed on canopies in parking lots. They are up to twice as expensive to install as normal open field solar arrays because the added material in the structure to elevate them for cars to park underneath. They can also be useful at protecting cars from extreme weather and the Sun's heat.

== Environmental considerations ==
=== Water pollution ===
Parking lots tend to be sources of water pollution because of their extensive impervious surfaces. Virtually all of the rain (minus evaporation) that falls becomes urban runoff. To avoid flooding and unsafe driving conditions, the lots are built to channel and collect runoff. Parking lots, along with roads, are often the principal source of water pollution in urban areas.

Motor vehicles are a constant source of pollutants, the most significant being gasoline, motor oil, polycyclic aromatic hydrocarbons (PAHs), and heavy metals. are found in combustion byproducts of gasoline, as well as in asphalt and coal tar-based sealants used to maintain parking lots.) Many parking lots are also significant sources of trash, which ends up in waterways.

Treatment of pollution: Traditionally, the runoff has been shunted directly into storm sewers, streams, dry wells or even sanitary sewers. However, most larger municipalities now require the construction of stormwater management facilities for new lots. Typical facilities include retention basins, infiltration basins and percolation trenches. Some newer designs include bioretention systems, which use plants more extensively to absorb and filter pollutants. However, most existing lots have limited or no facilities to control runoff.

Alternative paving materials: An alternative solution today is to use permeable paving surfaces, such as brick, pervious concrete, stone, special paving blocks, or tire-tread woven mats. These materials allow rain to soak into the ground through the spaces inherent in the parking lot surface. The ground then may become contaminated in the surface of the parking lot park, but this tends to stay in a small area of ground, which effectively filters water before it seeps away. This can however create problems if contaminants seep into groundwater, especially where there is groundwater abstraction 'downstream' for potable water supply.

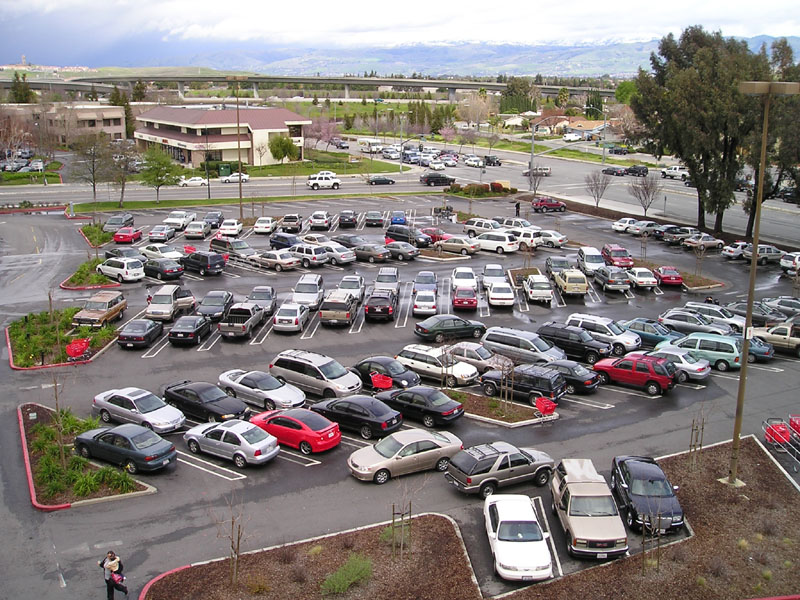
A San Jose, California parking lot in 2006, with landscaping and a diagonal parking pattern designed for one-way traffic.

=== Landscaping ===
Many areas today also require minimum landscaping in parking lots. This usually principally means the planting of trees to provide shade. Customers have long preferred shaded parking spaces in the summer, but parking lot providers have long been antagonistic to planting trees because of the extra cost of cleaning the parking lots.

Paved surfaces contribute to heat islands in two ways. The first is through excessive accumulation of heat. Dark materials and the enclosed canyons created by city buildings trap more of the sun's energy. The reflection rate of paving compared to natural surfaces is important as higher reflectance means cooler temperatures. Black pavements, the hottest, have solar reflectances of 5 to 10 percent. Lighter pavements have solar reflectance rates of 25 percent or higher. Reflectance values for soils and various types of vegetation range from 5 to 45 percent. The second cause of heat islands is the low moisture content of paving and building materials. Such materials are watertight, so no moisture is available to dissipate the sun's heat through evaporation.

Tree planting has been shown to significantly reduce temperatures in open, paved areas. In one study in Alabama, daytime summer temperatures of 120 °F (49 °C) were recorded in the centre of a bare parking lot, whereas where a small island of trees was present, temperatures only reached 89 °F (32 °C). It also found that a further 1 °F temperature reduction could be obtained for every additional canopy tree planted.

More recently, parking lots have been seen as prime real estate for installing large solar panel installations, with the additional benefit of shade for vehicles parked underneath.

=== Land usage ===
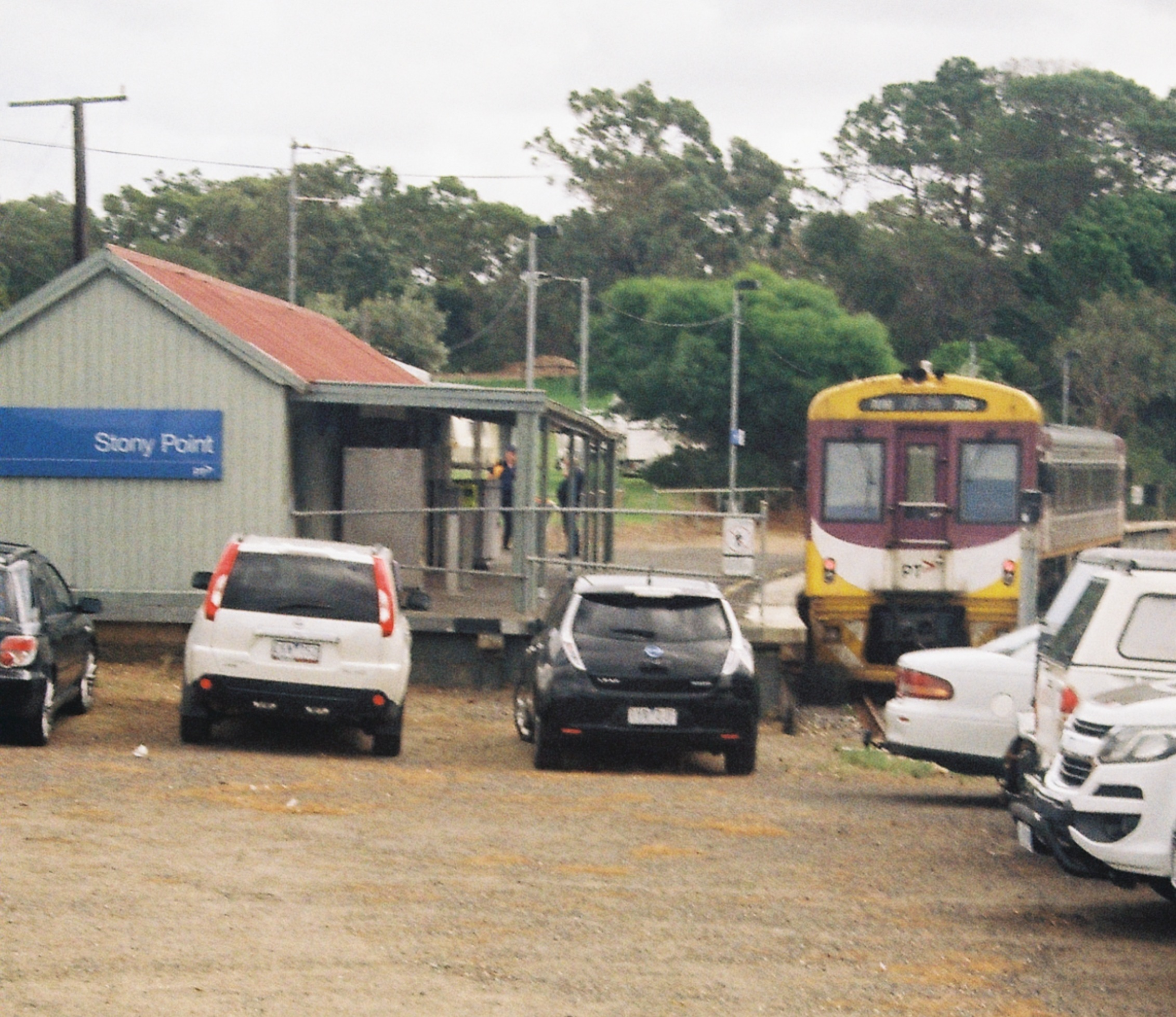
Car park at train station

A parking lot needs fairly large space, around 25 square meters or 270 square feet per parking spot. This means that lots usually need more land area than for corresponding buildings for offices or shops if most employees and visitors arrive by car. This means covering large areas with asphalt.

=== Services ===
Some lots have charging stations for battery vehicles. Some regions with especially cold winters provide electricity at most parking spots for engine block heaters, as antifreeze may be inadequate to prevent freezing.

=== Impact on climate ===
Parking lots are responsible for many greenhouse gas emissions because they increase driving and contributing to the urban heat island due to the materials they are built from.

== Notable lots ==
- The remains of Richard III were found under a parking lot in Leicester, England.
- A species of tardigrade, Macrobiotus shonaicus, was discovered in a parking lot in Tsuruoka, Japan.
- The West Edmonton Mall has the world's largest parking lot.
- 250 Water Street, a parking lot in New York City protected as a historical landmark since 1977.
- The Saint Valentine's Day Massacre took place in a parking garage in Lincoln Park, Chicago.
- 13 Miller's Court, off Dorset Street, the location of the final "canonical" Jack the Ripper murder, is now a parking lot.
- There is a parking lot on top of the exit location of the Führerbunker in Berlin, Germany, which was built in the late 1980s to deter the glorification of the site.

== See also ==
- Airport parking
- Automated parking system
- Automatic number-plate recognition (ANPR)
- Automatic vehicle location
- British Parking Association
- Charging station
- Green parking lot
- Indoor positioning system (IPS)
- Multi-storey car park
- Park and ride
- The Parking Lot Movie
- Parking meter
- Parking space
- Permeable paving
- Radio-frequency identification (RFID)
- Road surface marking
- Vehicle location data
