= Jennifer O'Connor (musician) =

American singer-songwriter

- Born: November 8, 1973 (age 51); Putnam, Connecticut
- Genres: Singer-songwriter
- Occupation(s): Musician, songwriter
- Instrument(s): Vocals, guitar
- Years active: 2000–present
- Labels: Kiam Records, Matador Records, Red Panda
- Website: http://jenniferoconnor.net/

Jennifer O'Connor (born November 8, 1973) is an American singer-songwriter. She has released a series of well-regarded solo albums, and has either toured or played with Wilco, the Indigo Girls, Feist, Yo La Tengo, Dump, and the Mountain Goats, among other bands and musicians. Paste magazine has called her a "songwriter's songwriter", describing her albums as "master classes in economy and clarity."

While she is one of a limited number of notable independent musicians who is publicly out as gay, she does not write music obviously targeted to a gay audience. She is based in Brooklyn and in addition to writing and performing her own music, she also runs a record label, Kiam Records, with seven other artists on its roster.

== Background ==
O'Connor was born in Putnam, Connecticut, and moved with her family to Florida while in high school. She did not learn to play guitar until she was 22, after graduating from Emory University. Her first performing experience came as part of the Atlanta-based band Violet, a group that was compared at the time to the Pixies and X.

After quitting the band she moved to New York City in 2000 and began playing solo. She supported herself by working a series of odd jobs in book stores and record stores. The most enjoyable and useful job she landed was working in the publicity office at the well-known music venue/record label the Knitting Factory."I’d work in the office all day, then go have some beer and watch a show," she told Time Out New York in 2006, about her experience there. "As someone who wanted to play music, it was incredibly inspiring being around all of that."

== Career ==
Her first recording was an EP that she self-released in 2000 called Truth Love Work. Reviewing the disc, Time Out New York wrote: "O'Connor is another Liz Phair or Elliott Smith waiting to happen" and praised her "understated guitar-based songs" and "matter of fact lyrics."

She followed the EP with a self-titled full-length CD in 2002, which she self-released on an imprint she called Kiam Records. Her next album, The Color and the Light, was released by Red Panda Records in 2005. Later that year, she signed a deal with Matador Records, based on her performance at the SXSW music festival. Her Matador debut, Over the Mountain, Across the Valley and Back to the Stars, was written in the aftermath of a personally difficult year, during which, among other things, she lost her older sister to brain cancer. She had previously lost a sister in a car accident in 1998. The album was generally well-received, with critics noting a pervasive sense of loss throughout the album. The music web site Pitchfork called the song Sister "one of the most genuinely affecting pop songs you'll hear all year, capably expressing adult pain without any delusions that pain makes you particularly soulful or special."

Even though she was signed with Matador at this point, O'Connor kept her own Kiam Records label running, and had begun releasing albums by other artists on the label. She also used the Kiam imprint to release a couple of 7-inch vinyl singles in 2007.

Her second album for Matador was 2008's Here With Me, a more upbeat album that was also given a largely positive reception. Spin wrote that her "unflinching lyrics and stunningly strong voice leap from distressing folk ballads to buzzing rock with ease." CMJ wrote that Here With Me "is so understated, that it's almost too easy to take for granted how good she is at what she does."

O'Connor has always been out, but it became a bit more visible when the cover of Here With Me featured a picture of her planting a kiss on the cheek of her girlfriend. She has never actively sought a lesbian audience, however, telling the web site AfterEllen.com: "I think I have avoided it in some ways, literally", while adding, "I mean, I'm gay and I'm completely comfortable with that, but it's never been a thing that's been related to what I do musically. It didn't seem relevant. With this record, it just kind of happened."

O'Connor was dropped from Matador after Here With Me succeeded critically but not popularly. O'Connor felt burned out and discouraged, and went back to working odd jobs around New York, including bartending on Broadway. After she got back to recording, she decided to release the album I Want What You Want on her own label largely because she did not want to wait to have to find a record deal somewhere. "I happen to have a record label, so I figured why not?" she told NBCNewYork.com in October 2011.

O'Connor released I Want What You Want on Kiam Records on November 8, 2011, which is her birthday. Guitar World called the album "bitingly frank and melodically gorgeous". In the past she has hired a lead guitarist for most of her songs but this time she did more of her own guitar playing. She toured in support of the album in the first half of 2012, and played at SXSW that spring.

In the fall of 2013, a song O'Connor co-wrote called "Running Blues" was premiered on the FX biker drama Sons of Anarchy. O'Connor's co-writer on the song was Bob Thiele, the show's composer and music supervisor

== Discography ==
=== Albums ===
- Jennifer O'Connor, Kiam Records, 2002
- The Color and the Light, Red Panda Records, 2005
- Over the Mountain, Across the Valley and Back to the Stars, Matador Records, 2006
- Here With Me, Matador Records, 2008
- I Want What You Want, Kiam Records, 2011
- Surface Noise, 2016
- Born at the Disco, 2021

=== EPs ===
- Truth Love Work, self-released, 2000
- Another Side of Jennifer O'Connor (digital only, eMusic exclusive) 2006

=== Singles ===
- "Little Airplane Heart" (with Choo Choo La Rouge), 2007 (7-inch vinyl)
- "I Was So Wrong" (Dump remix), 2008

=== Compilation appearances (selected) ===
- "Laughlike" on Ladyfest East, 28 Days Records, 2001
- "The Color and the Light" on Little Darla Has a Treat For You, Vo. 23, Darla Records, 2005
- "Deck the Halls" on Peace on Earth, Vol. II (to benefit the Children of Uganda Fund), Hard to Find a Friend Records, 2008
- "Always In Your Mind" on Me + You Booklet, Vol. I, American Apparel, 2008
- "Cover Me" on Play Some Pool, Skip Some School, Act Real Cool: Tribute to Springsteen, Where It's At Is Where You Are Records, 2009
- "Tonight We Ride" on Matador at 21 (box set), Matador Records, 2010
