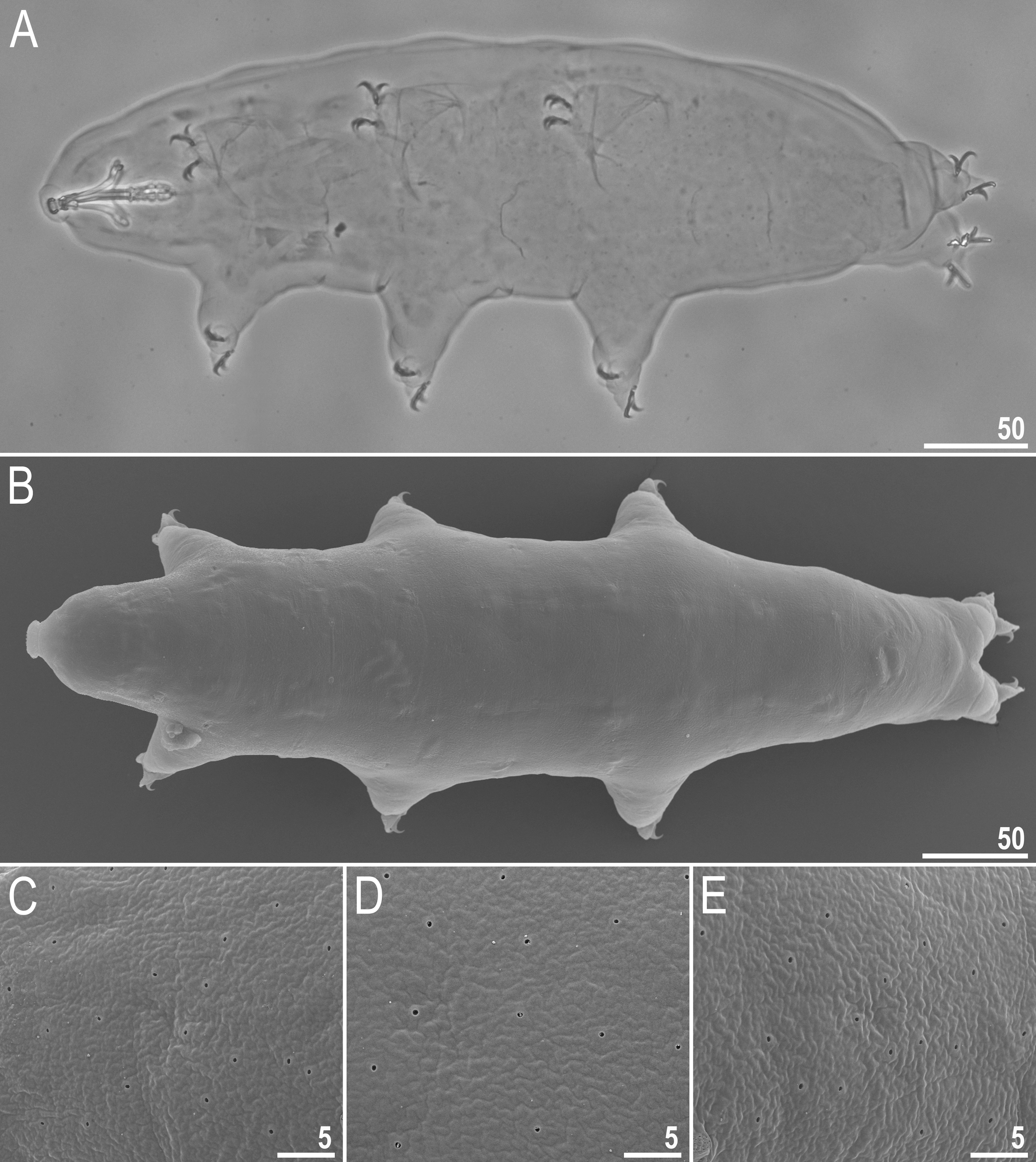
- A. Dorsoventral view of holotype (PCM); B. Dorsal view of paratype (SEM); C–E. Close up of anterior, median, and posterior, respectively, of paratype, showing pores (SEM). Scale bars in μm.

Scientific classification
- Kingdom: Animalia
- Phylum: Tardigrada
- Class: Eutardigrada
- Order: Parachela
- Family: Macrobiotidae
- Genus: Macrobiotus
- Species: M. shonaicus

Binomial name
- Macrobiotus shonaicus Stec et al., 2018
- Type locality of M. shonaicus

= Macrobiotus shonaicus =

Species of tardigrade

Macrobiotus shonaicus (Japanese: ショウナイチョウメイムシ) is a species of tardigrade in the family Macrobiotidae. It is found throughout Japan. The species description was published in 2018. The insides of their first three pairs of legs have a slight fold above their claws, and their eggs have processes whose terminal discs split off into thin filaments.

== Taxonomic history ==
The species description was written by Daniel Stec, Kazuharu Arakawa, and Łukasz Michalczyk; it was published in PLOS One in February 2018.

Arakawa collected ten M. shonaicus specimens in May 2016 from moss growing in his apartment building's parking lot, in Tsuruoka, Japan. The moss, Bryum argenteum, was growing on a concrete surface. One pair of these tardigrades successfully reproduced in vitro, yielding an isogenic strain. The holotype, 57 paratypes, and 34 eggs were deposited at Jagiellonian University in Kraków. An additional 17 paratypes and 7 eggs were deposited at Keio University, Tsuruoka.

The specific epithet, shonaicus, is named after Shōnai, which the authors describe as "the region in Japan where the new species was collected".

== Distribution ==
The type locality is 38°44′24″N 139°48′26″E, "Otsuka-machi, Tsuruoka-City, Japan". It is found widely throughout Japan.

== Description ==
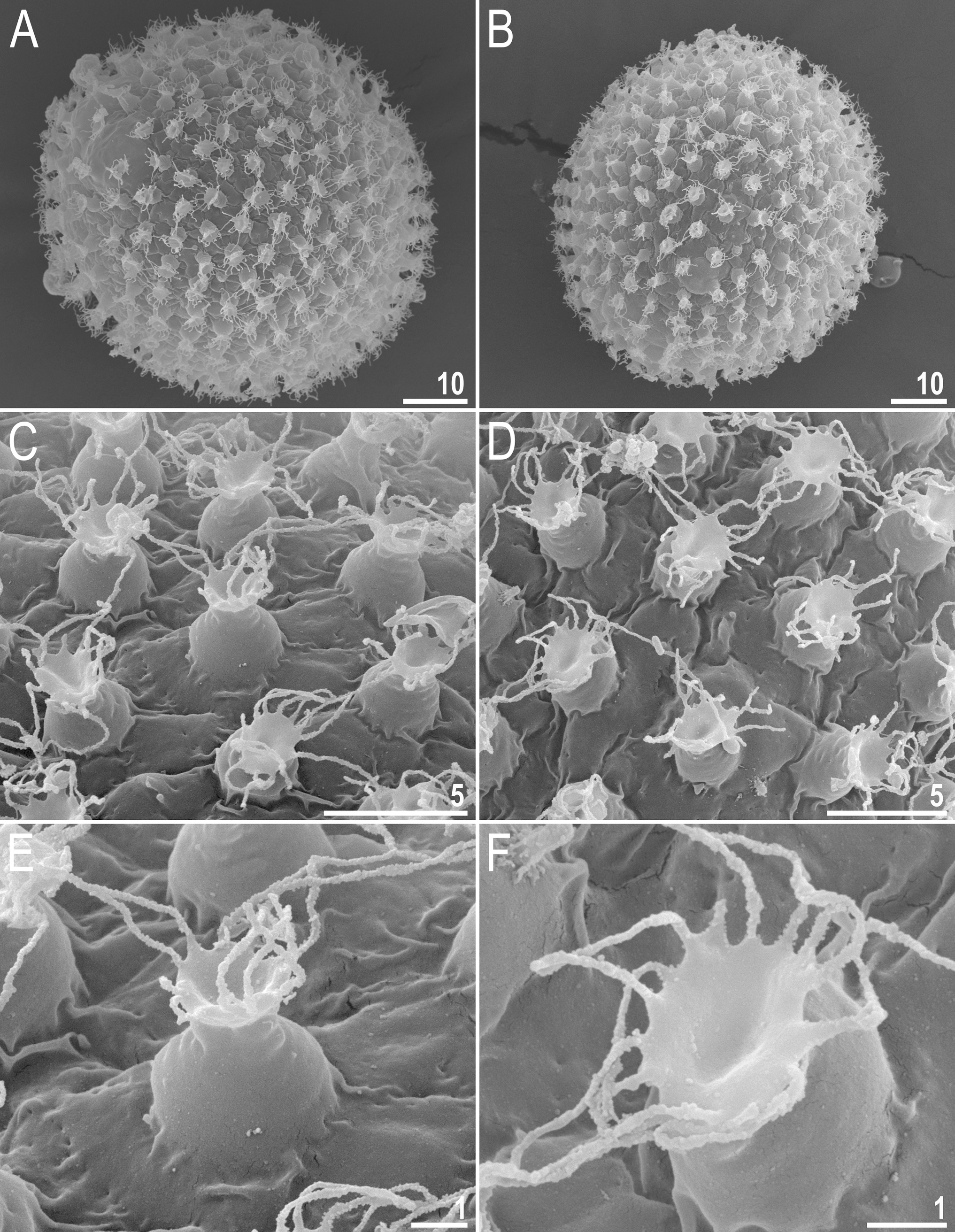
SEM view of egg (scale bar in μm)

Juveniles have a white body, while the body of adults is a slightly yellowish. They have eyes. Round pores with a diameter of 0.2–0.4 μm are scattered over the surface of their legs, their sides, and their backs. The internal surface of their first three pairs of legs have a bulge; these pairs also have an inside fold above the claws. This species is dioecious, but there are no secondary sex characteristics. The measurements of their body lengths range 218–743 μm.

The eggs' color ranges from white to pale yellow and their shape ranges from spherical to slightly ovoid. The full diameter of the eggs range 56.4–70.8 μm. Their surface is covered with protruding inverted goblet-shaped platforms, whose terminal disc is surrounded by "teeth" which extend out into thin, fragile filaments.

Stec and colleagues performed an experiment to see if females could reproduce parthenogenetically. Reproduction was not observed when individuals were separated and not allowed to mate, suggesting they cannot.

Stec and colleagues sequenced four molecular markers: 18S rRNA, 28S rRNA, ITS-2, and mitochondrial COI. DNA was sequenced from four specimens. The sequences were submitted to GenBank. Their analysis yielded a single haplotype each for the 18S rRNA and the 28S rRNA and two haplotypes each for the ITS-2 and COI. The most conservative marker with respect to other species in the M. hufelandi complex was 18S rRNA, which differed 0.3–3.3% from the available sequences in GenBank. This was followed by 28S rRNA (5.0–9.8%), ITS-2 (11.2–29.7%), and COI (19.6–26.9%).

== Phylogeny ==
Stec and colleagues' analysis placed M. shonaicus in a clade along with M. paulinae, M. polypiformis, M. scoticus and M. kristenseni. This clade is within the hufelandi group.
