= Dump (band) =

U.S. musical group

- Origin: Charlottesville, Virginia
- Genres: Indie rock, Lo-fi
- Years active: 1991 – current
- Labels: 18 Wheeler Records, Brinkman Records, Smells Like Records, Shrimper
- Members: James McNew

Dump is a vehicle for releasing the four-track home recordings of Yo La Tengo bassist James McNew. His recordings occasionally feature guest performers such as Sue Garner and Fontaine Toups (of Versus). For live performances McNew has been joined at various times by Ira Kaplan, Georgia Hubley, Todd Barry on drums, and David Ramirez on guitar.

== Discography ==
- Dump (7-inch EP) (18 Wheeler Records) 1992
- Superpowerless (CD album) (Brinkman Records) 1993
- Dump (7-inch EP) (18 Wheeler Records) 1994
- International Airport (10-inch mini-album) (Smells Like Records) 1995
- I Can Hear Music (CD/2-CD album) (Brinkman Records) 1995
- Phantom Perspective b/w The Lie (7-inch single) (Hi-Ball Records) 1997
- A Plea for Tenderness (CD album) (Brinkman Records) 1997
- That Skinny Motherfucker With the High Voice? (MC mini-album) (Shrimper) 1998 / (CD album; reissue with 5 extra tracks) (Shrimper) 2001
  (an album of Prince covers)
- Easter Dress b/w Almost Home (7-inch single) (Favorite Things) 1998
- Women in Rock (CD EP) (Shrimper) 1999
- Dive For Memory (7-inch single) (Third Gear Records) 1999 (split single with Lambchop)
- A Grown-Ass Man (CD album) (Shrimper) 2003
- Jennifer O'Connor & Dump (7-inch single) (Kiam Records) 2008 (split single)
- NYC Tonight (12-inch EP Single) (Presspop Music) 2012
- The Silent Treatment (LP album) (Grapefruit Records) 2013
- Dennis' Picks Volume One (Cassette album) (Shrimper Records) 2016
- Blown Dunks (Cassette album) (Edita la Servidumbre) 2019
- Feelings 1 & 2 (7-inch single) (Care Records) 2020
