= Paramacrobiotus =

Scientific classification
- Kingdom: Animalia
- Phylum: Tardigrada
- Class: Eutardigrada
- Order: Parachela
- Family: Macrobiotidae
- Genus: Paramacrobiotus; Guidetti, Schill, Bertolani, Dandekar & Wolf, 2009

Type species
- Paramacrobiotus richtersi (Murray, 1911)

Genus of tardigrades

Paramacrobiotus is a genus of tardigrades in the family Macrobiotidae. It contains 42 species and has a cosmopolitan distribution.

== Species ==
Paramacrobiotus contains the following species:

- Paramacrobiotus alekseevi (Tumanov, 2005)
- Paramacrobiotus arduus Guidetti, Cesari, Bertolani, Altiero & Rebecchi, 2019
- Paramacrobiotus areolatus (Murray, 1907)
- Paramacrobiotus celsus Guidetti, Cesari, Bertolani, Altiero & Rebecchi, 2019
- Paramacrobiotus centesimus (Pilato, 2000)
- Paramacrobiotus chieregoi (Maucci & Durante Pasa, 1980)
- Paramacrobiotus corgatensis (Pilato, Binda & Lisi, 2002)
- Paramacrobiotus csotiensis (Iharos, 1966)
- Paramacrobiotus danielae (Pilato, Binda, Napolitano & Moncada, 2001)
- Paramacrobiotus danielisae (Pilato, Binda & Lisi, 2006)
- Paramacrobiotus depressus Guidetti, Cesari, Bertolani, Altiero & Rebecchi, 2019
- Paramacrobiotus derkai (Degma, Michalczyk & Kaczmarek, 2008)
- Paramacrobiotus experimentalis Kaczmarek, Mioduchowska, Poprawa & Roszkowska, 2020
- Paramacrobiotus fairbanksi Schill, Förster, Dandekar & Wolf, 2010
- Paramacrobiotus filipi Dudziak, Stec & Michalczyk, 2020
- Paramacrobiotus garynahi (Kaczmarek, Michalczyk & Diduszko, 2005)
- Paramacrobiotus gerlachae (Pilato, Binda & Lisi, 2004)
- Paramacrobiotus halei (Bartels, Pilato, Lisi & Nelson, 2009)
- Paramacrobiotus hapukuensis (Pilato, Binda & Lisi, 2006)
- Paramacrobiotus huziori (Mihalczyk & Kaczmarek, 2006)
- Paramacrobiotus intii Kaczmarek, Cytan, Zawierucha, Diduszko & Michalczyk, 2014
- Paramacrobiotus kenianus Schill, Förster, Dandekar & Wolf, 2010
- Paramacrobiotus klymenki Pilato, Kiosya, Lisi & Sabella, 2012
- Paramacrobiotus lachowskae Stec, Roszkowska, Kaczmarek & Michalczyk, 2018
- Paramacrobiotus lorenae (Biserov, 1996)
- Paramacrobiotus magdalenae (Mihalczyk & Kaczmarek, 2006)
- Paramacrobiotus metropolitanus Sugiura, Matsumoto & Kunieda, 2022
- Paramacrobiotus palaui Schill, Förster, Dandekar & Wolf, 2010
- Paramacrobiotus peteri (Pilato, Claxton & Binda, 1989)
- Paramacrobiotus pius Lisi, Binda & Pilato, 2016
- Paramacrobiotus priviterae (Binda, Pilato, Moncada & Napolitano, 2001)
- Paramacrobiotus richtersi (Murray, 1911)
- Paramacrobiotus rioplatensis (Claps & Rossi, 1997)
- Paramacrobiotus sagani Daza, Caicedo, Lisi & Quiroga, 2017
- Paramacrobiotus savai (Binda & Pilato, 2001)
- Paramacrobiotus sklodowskae (Michalczyk, Kaczmarek & Węglarska, 2006)
- Paramacrobiotus spatialis Guidetti, Cesari, Bertolani, Altiero & Rebecchi, 2019
- Paramacrobiotus spinosus Kaczmarek, Gawlak, Bartels, Nelson & Roszkowska, 2017
- Paramacrobiotus submorulatus (Iharos, 1966)
- Paramacrobiotus tonollii (Ramazzotti, 1956)
- Paramacrobiotus vanescens (Pilato, Binda & Catanzaro, 1991)
- Paramacrobiotus walteri (Biserov, 1998)
