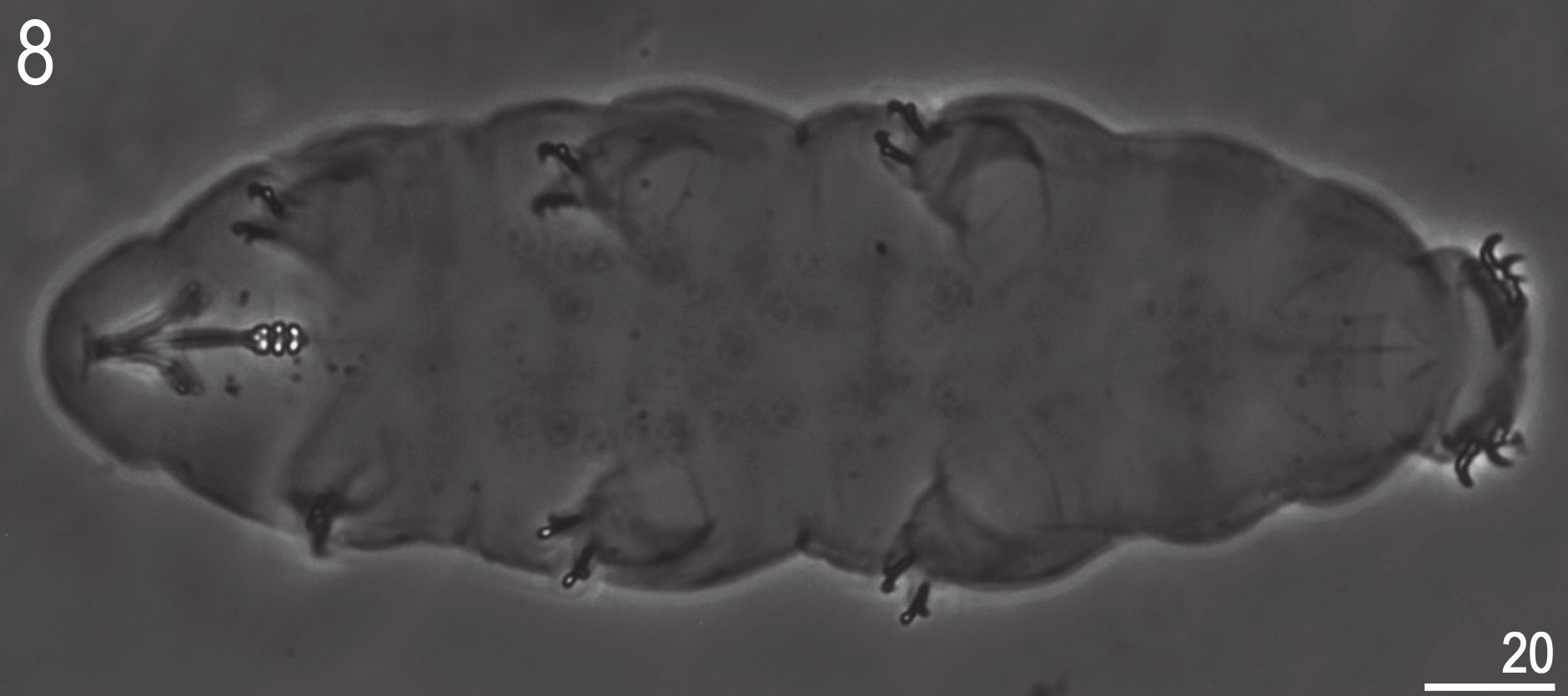
- Minibiotus formosus

Scientific classification
- Kingdom: Animalia
- Phylum: Tardigrada
- Class: Eutardigrada
- Order: Parachela
- Family: Macrobiotidae
- Genus: Minibiotus; Schuster, 1980

= Minibiotus =

Genus of tardigrades

Minibiotus is a genus of tardigrades belonging to the family Macrobiotidae.

The genus has almost cosmopolitan distribution.

== Species ==
Species:

- Minibiotus acontistus (de Barros, 1942)
- Minibiotus aculeatus (Murray, 1910)
- Minibiotus africanus Binda & Pilato, 1995
- Minibiotus allani (Murray, 1913)
- Minibiotus aquatilis Claxton, 1998
- Minibiotus asteris Claxton, 1998
- Minibiotus bernhardi R. Schuster, 2021
- Minibiotus bisoctus (Horning, Schuster & Grigarick, 1978)
- Minibiotus citlalium Dueñas-Cedillo & García-Román, 2020
- Minibiotus claxtonae Rossi, Claps & Ardohain, 2009
- Minibiotus constellatus Michalczyk & Kaczmarek, 2003
- Minibiotus continuus Pilato & Lisi, 2006
- Minibiotus crassidens (Murray, 1907)
- Minibiotus decrescens Binda & Pilato, 1995
- Minibiotus diphasconides (Iharos, 1969)
- Minibiotus diversus Ciobanu, Roszkowska & Kaczmarek, 2015
- Minibiotus eichhorni Michalczyk & Kaczmarek, 2004
- Minibiotus ethelae Claxton, 1998
- Minibiotus fallax Pilato, Claxton & Binda, 1989
- Minibiotus floriparus Claxton, 1998
- Minibiotus formosus Zawierucha, Dziamięcki, Jakubowska, Michalczyk & Kaczmarek, 2014
- Minibiotus furcatus (Ehrenberg, 1859)
- Minibiotus granatai (Pardi, 1941)
- Minibiotus gumersindoi Guil & Guidetti, 2005
- Minibiotus harrylewisi Meyer & Hinton, 2009
- Minibiotus hispidus Claxton, 1998
- Minibiotus hufelandioides (Murray, 1910)
- Minibiotus intermedius (Plate, 1888)
- Minibiotus ioculator Stec, Kristensen & Michalczyk, 2020
- Minibiotus jonesorum Meyer, Lyons, Nelson & Hinton, 2011
- Minibiotus julietae (de Barros, 1942)
- Minibiotus keppelensis Claxton, 1998
- Minibiotus lazzaroi (Maucci, 1986)
- Minibiotus maculartus Pilato & Claxton, 1988
- Minibiotus marcusi (de Barros, 1942)
- Minibiotus milleri Claxton, 1998
- Minibiotus orthofasciatus Fontoura, Pilato, Lisi & Morais, 2009
- Minibiotus pentannulatus Londoño, Daza, Lisi & Quiroga, 2017
- Minibiotus pilatus Claxton, 1998
- Minibiotus poricinctus Claxton, 1998
- Minibiotus pseudofurcatus (Pilato, 1972)
- Minibiotus pseudostellarus Roszkowska, Stec, Ciobanu & Kaczmarek, 2016
- Minibiotus pustulatus (Ramazzotti, 1959)
- Minibiotus ramazzottii Binda & Pilato, 1992
- Minibiotus scopulus Claxton, 1998
- Minibiotus sidereus Pilato, Binda & Lisi, 2003
- Minibiotus spertii (Ramazzotti, 1957)
- Minibiotus stuckenbergi (Dastych, Ryan & Watkins, 1990)
- Minibiotus subintermedius (Ramazzotti, 1962)
- Minibiotus taiti Claxton, 1998
- Minibiotus vinciguerrae Binda & Pilato, 1992
- Minibiotus weglarskae Michalczyk, Kaczmarek & Claxton, 2005
- Minibiotus weinerorum (Dastych, 1984)
- Minibiotus wuzhishanensis Li, Wang & Wang, 2008
- Minibiotus xavieri Fontoura, Pilato, Morais & Lisi, 2009
