= Calcarobiotus =

Scientific classification
- Domain: Eukaryota
- Kingdom: Animalia
- Phylum: Tardigrada
- Class: Eutardigrada
- Order: Parachela
- Family: Macrobiotidae
- Genus: Calcarobiotus; Dastych, 1993

Genus of tardigrades

Calcarobiotus is a genus of tardigrades belonging to the family Macrobiotidae.

The species of this genus are found in Africa.

Species:

- Calcarobiotus digeronimoi Pilato, Binda & Lisi, 2004
- Calcarobiotus filmeri Dastych, 1993
- Calcarobiotus gildae (Maucci & Durante Pasa, 1981)
- Calcarobiotus hainanensis Li, Wang & Wang, 2008
- Calcarobiotus imperialis Abe & Takeda, 2000
- Calcarobiotus longinoi Kaczmarek, Michalczyk & Guidetti, 2006
- Calcarobiotus occultus Dastych, 1993
- Calcarobiotus parvicalcar Pilato & Lisi, 2009
- Calcarobiotus polygonatus (Binda & Guglielmino, 1991)
- Calcarobiotus tetrannulatus Pilato, Binda & Lisi, 2004
