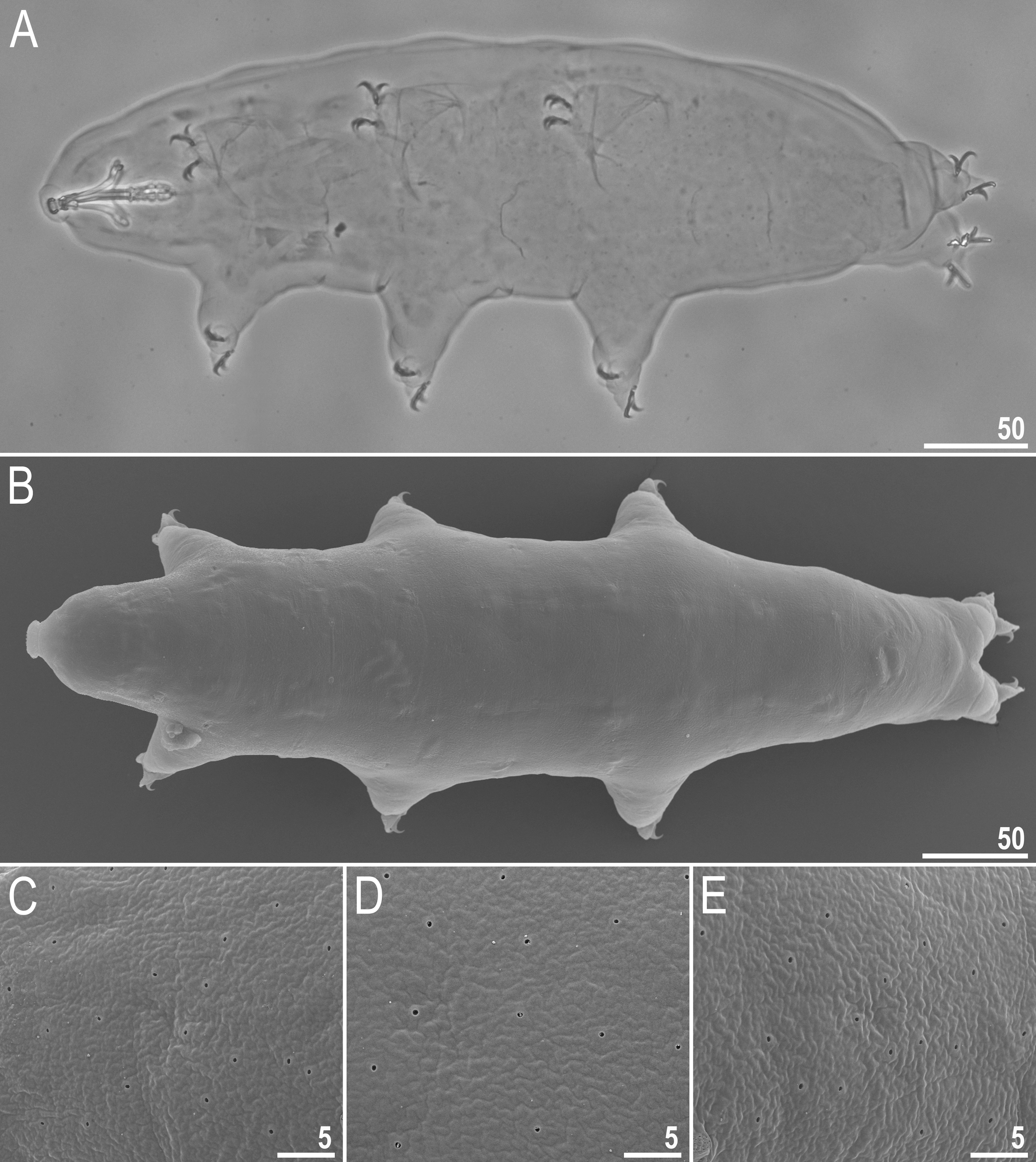
- Macrobiotus shonaicus

Scientific classification
- Kingdom: Animalia
- Phylum: Tardigrada
- Class: Eutardigrada
- Order: Parachela
- Family: Macrobiotidae
- Genus: Macrobiotus; C.A.S. Schultze, 1834

Type species
- Macrobiotus hufelandi C.A.S. Schultze, 1834

= Macrobiotus =

Genus of tardigrades

Macrobiotus is a genus of tardigrades consisting of about 100 species within the family Macrobiotidae. Of genera within the phylum Tardigrada, Macrobiotus is one of the most species-abundant. Macrobiotus hufelandi, identified by German researcher Karl August Sigismund Schultze in 1834, is recognized as the first taxonomically named tardigrade species. By extension, Macrobiotus was the first ever described tardigrade genus. Macrobiotus shares similarities to other tardigrade genera, particularly in moulting a non-living cuticle over multiple life stages and robust stress tolerance mechanisms. However, Macrobiotus tends to be differentiated from other tardigrades by being one of few genera that freely lay ornamented eggs in reproduction. This genera has a relatively diverse distribution in both terrestrial and aquatic environments.

== Anatomy and Morphology ==
=== Claws ===
Macrobiotus species commonly exhibit uniform diploclaws on their legs.

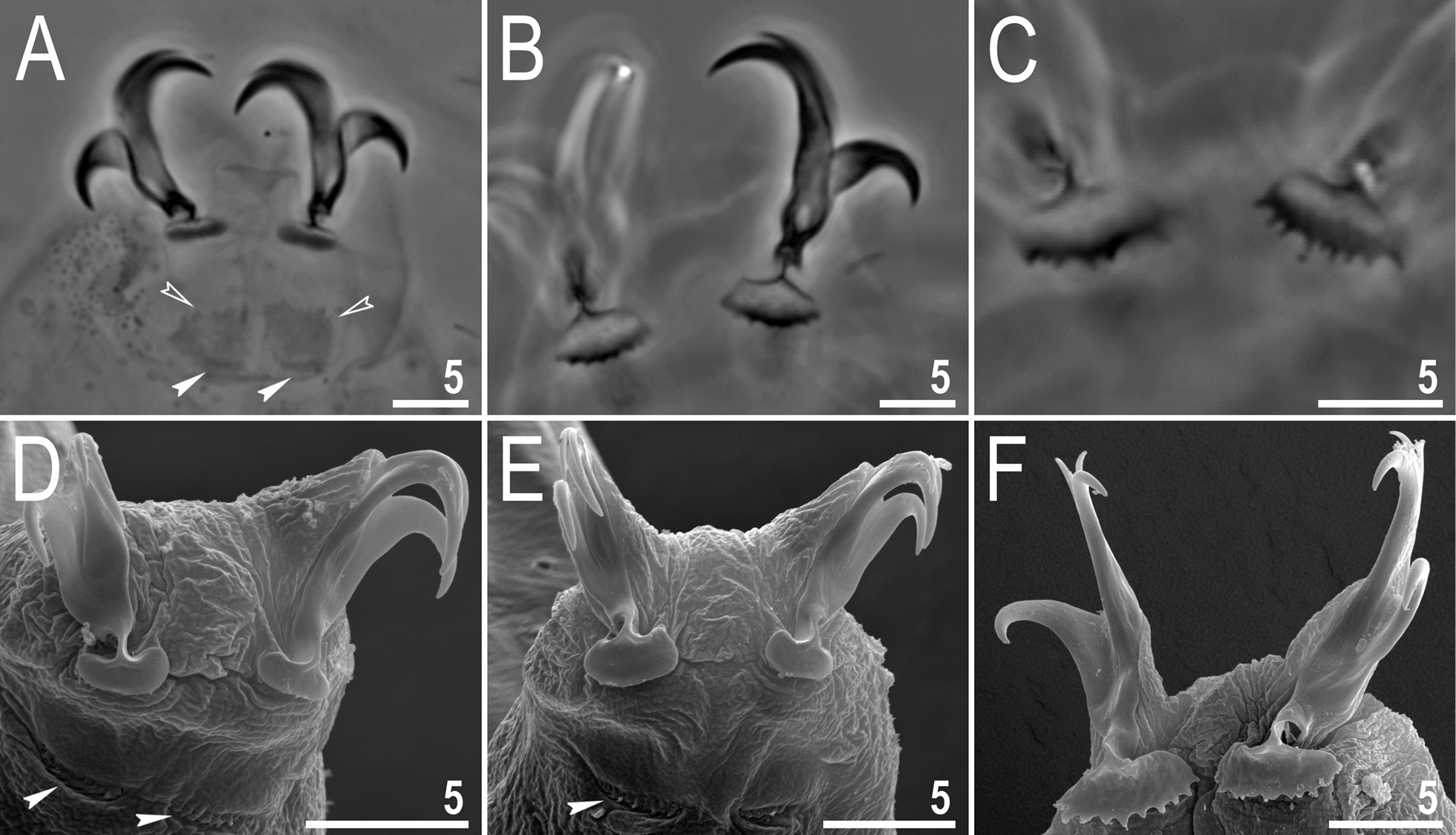
Macrobiotus rybaki, typical claw conformation.

=== Cuticle ===
Macrobiotus belong to the clade Ecdysozoa, characterized for non-living cuticle layers that can be moulted over various life stages. This cuticular exoskeleton layer facilitates gas and water exchange. Protective benefits of the cuticle typically outweigh the energy costs required to moult.

=== Nervous System ===
Macrobiotus neurons innervate a brain with inner and outer connectives, the latter connecting the brain to the trunk. Anterior leg nerves, posterior leg nerves, and peripheral nerves branch off of trunk ganglia. Connectives bridge adjacent trunk ganglia, and interpedal commissures bridge adjacent connectives.

=== Other Physiological Features ===
Many Macrobiotus species also share a firm buccal tube containing a ventral lamina without a ventral hook, a pharynx with one microplacoid and two macroplacoids, and tend to exhibit 10 peribuccal lamellae.

== Habitat and Distribution ==
=== Habitat ===
Macrobiotus tend to inhabit limnoterrestrial habitats primarily consisting of mosses, though some Macrobiotus have also been discovered near lichens or aquatic plants. Some species of Macrobiotus are obligatory freshwater invertebrates.

Known Global Distribution of Macrobiotus
Continent	Region
Africa	South West Africa
	Tanzania
Antarctica	Sub-Antarctic Islands
Asia	China
	Israel
	Kyrgyzstan
	Malaysia
Europe	Finland
	Germany
	Portugal
	Sweden
North America	Canada
	Greenland
South America	Brazil
	French Guiana

=== Diet ===
Macrobiotus sapiens is an example of a herbivorous diet consisting of algae.

== Behaviour ==
=== Reproduction ===
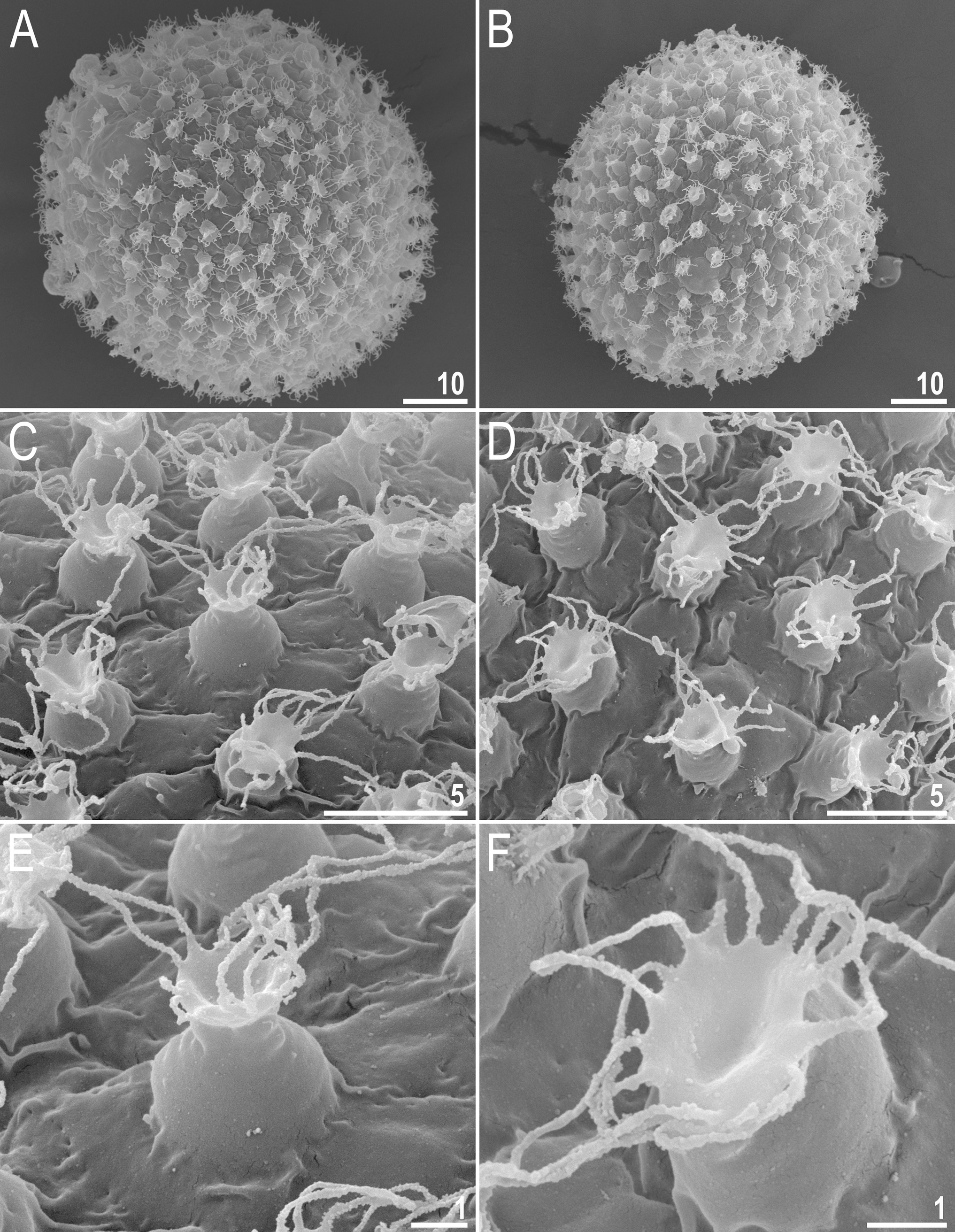
Macrobiotus shonaicus, ornamented egg chorion morphology.

Macrobiotus species exhibit a unique style of ornamented egg morphology and deposition process of freely laying ornamented eggs, contrasting to the ancestral state of freely laying smooth eggs. This is a synapomorphy of two families, Eohypsibioidea and Macrobiotidae, with Macrobiotoidea including the genus Macrobiotus. Ornamented eggs can limit water evaporation due to surface tension between water molecules and the egg's ornamentation.

Free-laying of eggs also differs from other common reproductive tendencies for tardigrades, whereby the old cuticle (or the exuvia) is used as an 'egg keeper' to allow egg development after laying. It is hypothesized that releasing eggs into the environment reduces predation of embryonic Macrobiotus species, providing an evolutionary advantage compared to laying eggs in only one place within the exuvia.

Partner finding behaviour occurs for freely-ovipositing Macrobiotus shonaicus species, where the male touches a female tardigrade's cloaca with their mouth several times, finishing their courtship ritual once the female tardigrade stops moving. Freely-ovipositing species are thought to identify partners using pheromones to accommodate only having simple light detection abilities.

Some free-laying egg species like M. shonaicus utilize chemotaxis for spermatozoa released during ejaculation to identify and swim towards the female's cloaca. Eggs are typically laid shortly after reproduction by the female, ranging from 16 minutes to 2 days after mating.

Macrobiotus exhibits bisexual achiasmy, whereby the process of crossing-over of genetic information between homologous chromosomes in meiosis is absent in both the male and female sex.

=== Stress Response ===
==== Anhydrobiosis ====
Macrobiotus can withstand desiccation conditions by entering a state of anhydrobiosis. Compared to other tardigrades, Macrobiotus displays a moderate degree of desiccation tolerance. Some species have been observed to accumulate trehalose during anhydrobiotic states. Trehalose can induce the anhydrobiotic state, serving as a potential energy source while also protecting cellular membranes and proteins in freezing and desiccation conditions. Survival during anhydrobiosis depends on body size, particularly the size of energy-storing storage cells, though the reproductive state of oocyte maturation has no effect. It is predicted that the exoskeletal cuticle likely facilitates anhydrobiosis.

Some Macrobiotus may also demonstrate an encysted state primarily during periods of rest, but also metabolic depression.

==== Starvation ====
One example species, M. sapiens, forms storage cells within their internal cavity in response to reduced food availability. This strategy helps Macrobiotus species survive for several weeks without food, during which storage cell sizes significantly decrease.

=== Moulting ===
Macrobiotus, like other tardigrades, requires periodic moutling of their cuticle exoskeleton to grow in size. Cuticle lining the foregut independently moults first and is expelled through the mouth, followed by moutling the cuticles lining the exterior body and hindgut. Moulting may occur in response to poor environmental conditions or starvation as overall body size decreases.

Both male and female partners of M. shonaicus, a freely-ovipositing species, moult immediately before reproduction, moulting during the process of developing mature oocytes.

== Species ==
The genus includes the following species:

- Macrobiotus acadianus (Meyer & Domingue, 2011)
- Macrobiotus almadai Fontoura, Pilato & Lisi, 2008
- Macrobiotus alvaroi Pilato & Kaczmarek, 2007
- Macrobiotus anderssoni Richters, 1907
- Macrobiotus andinus Maucci, 1988
- Macrobiotus anemone Meyer, Domingue & Hinton, 2014
- Macrobiotus annewintersae Vecchi & Stec, 2021
- Macrobiotus ariekammensis Węglarska, 1965
- Macrobiotus azzunae Ben Marnissi, Cesari, Rebecchi & Bertolani, 2021
- Macrobiotus basiatus Nelson, Adkins Fletcher, Guidetti, Roszkowska, Grobys & Kaczmarek, 2020
- Macrobiotus birendrai Kayastha et al., 2021
- Macrobiotus biserovi Bertolani, Guidi & Rebecchi, 1996
- Macrobiotus caelestis Coughlan, Michalczyk & Stec, 2019
- Macrobiotus caelicola Kathman, 1990
- Macrobiotus canaricus Stec, Krzywański & Michalczyk, 2018
- Macrobiotus caymanensis Meyer, 2011
- Macrobiotus crenulatus Richters, 1904
- Macrobiotus crustulus Stec, Dudziak & Michalczyk, 2020
- Macrobiotus dariae Pilato & Bertolani, 2004
- Macrobiotus deceptor Meyer, Hinton, Gladney & Klumpp, 2017
- Macrobiotus denticulus Dastych, 2002
- Macrobiotus diversus Biserov, 1990
- Macrobiotus dolosus Bertolani et al., 2023
- Macrobiotus drakensbergi Dastych, 1993
- Macrobiotus dulciporus Roszkowska, Gawlak, Draga & Kaczmarek, 2019
- Macrobiotus echinogenitus Richters, 1903
- Macrobiotus engbergi Stec, Tumanov & Kristensen, 2020
- Macrobiotus fontourai Bertolani et al., 2023
- Macrobiotus furcatus Ehrenberg, 1859
- Macrobiotus glebkai Biserov, 1990
- Macrobiotus grandis Richters, 1911
- Macrobiotus gretae Massa et al., 2021
- Macrobiotus halophilus Fontoura, Rubal & Veiga, 2017
- Macrobiotus hannae Nowak & Stec, 2018
- Macrobiotus horningi Kaczmarek & Michalczyk, 2017
- Macrobiotus hufelandi C.A.S. Schultze, 1834
- Macrobiotus humilis Binda & Pilato, 2001
- Macrobiotus hupingensis Yuan et al., 2022
- Macrobiotus hyperboreus Biserov, 1990
- Macrobiotus iharosi Pilato, Binda & Catanzaro, 1991
- Macrobiotus insularis Pilato, 2006
- Macrobiotus joannae Pilato & Binda, 1983
- Macrobiotus julianae (Meyer, 2012)
- Macrobiotus kamilae Coughlan & Stec, 2019
- Macrobiotus kazmierskii Kaczmarek & Michalczyk, 2009
- Macrobiotus kirghizicus Tumanov, 2005
- Macrobiotus kosmali Kayastha et al., 2023
- Macrobiotus kristenseni Guidetti, Peluffo, Rocha, Cesari & Moly de Peluffo, 2013
- Macrobiotus kurasi Dastych, 1981
- Macrobiotus lazzaroi Maucci, 1986
- Macrobiotus lissostomus Durante Pasa & Maucci, 1979
- Macrobiotus longipes Mihelčič, 1971
- Macrobiotus macrocalix Bertolani & Rebecchi, 1993
- Macrobiotus maculatus Iharos, 1973
- Macrobiotus madegassus Maucci, 1993
- Macrobiotus mandalaae Pilato, 1974
- Macrobiotus margoae Stec, Vecchi & Bartels, 2021 in Stec et al. 2021
- Macrobiotus marlenae Kaczmarek & Michalczyk, 2004
- Macrobiotus martini Bartels, Pilato, Lisi & Nelson, 2009
- Macrobiotus mileri Stec, 2024
- Macrobiotus modestus Pilato & Lisi, 2009
- Macrobiotus muralis Bertolani et al., 2023
- Macrobiotus naginae Vecchi et al., 2022
- Macrobiotus naskreckii Bąkowski, Roszkowska, Gawlak & Kaczmarek, 2016
- Macrobiotus nebrodensis Pilato, Sabella, D'Urso & Lisi, 2017
- Macrobiotus nelsonae Guidetti, 1998
- Macrobiotus noemiae Roszkowska & Kaczmarek, 2019
- Macrobiotus noongaris Coughlan & Stec, 2019
- Macrobiotus norvegicus Mihelčič, 1971
- Macrobiotus occidentalis occidentalis Murray, 1910
- Macrobiotus occidentalis striatus Dastych, 1974
- Macrobiotus ocotensis Pilato, 2006
- Macrobiotus ovovittatus Stec, 2024
- Macrobiotus pallarii Maucci, 1954
- Macrobiotus papei Stec, Kristensen & Michalczyk, 2018
- Macrobiotus patagonicus Maucci, 1988
- Macrobiotus paulinae Stec, Smolak, Kaczmarek & Michalczyk, 2015
- Macrobiotus persimilis Binda & Pilato, 1972
- Macrobiotus personatus Biserov, 1990
- Macrobiotus peteri Pilato, Binda & Catanzaro, 1991
- Macrobiotus pisacensis Kaczmarek, Cytan, Zawierucha, Diduszko & Michalczyk, 2014
- Macrobiotus polonicus Pilato, Kaczmarek, Michalczyk & Lisi, 2003
- Macrobiotus polyopus Marcus, 1928
- Macrobiotus polypiformis Roszkowska, Ostrowska, Stec, Janko & Kaczmarek, 2017
- Macrobiotus porifini Kuzdrowska, Mioduchowska, Gawlak, Bartylak, A. Kepel, M. Kepel & Kaczmarek, 2021
- Macrobiotus primitivae de Barros, 1942
- Macrobiotus psephus du Bois-Reymond Marcus, 1944
- Macrobiotus pseudofurcatus Pilato, 1972
- Macrobiotus pseudohufelandi Stec, Vecchi, Calhim & Michalczyk, 2021
- Macrobiotus pseudopallarii Stec, Vecchi & Michalczyk, 2021 in Stec et al. 2021
- Macrobiotus punctillus Pilato, Binda & Azzaro, 1990
- Macrobiotus radiatus Pilato, Binda & Catanzaro, 1991
- Macrobiotus ragonesei Binda, Pilato, Moncada & Napolitano, 2001
- Macrobiotus ramoli Dastych, 2005
- Macrobiotus rawsoni Horning, Schuster & Grigarick, 1978
- Macrobiotus rebecchii Stec, 2022
- Macrobiotus recens Cuénot, 1932
- Macrobiotus richtersi Pilato, Binda & Catanzaro, 1991
- Macrobiotus ripperi Stec, Vecchi & Michalczyk, 2021 in Stec et al. 2021
- Macrobiotus rybaki Stec & Vecchi, 2021 in Vecchi & Stec 2021
- Macrobiotus sandrae Bertolani & Rebecchi, 1993
- Macrobiotus santoroi Pilato & D'Urso, 1976
- Macrobiotus sapiens Binda & Pilato, 1984
- Macrobiotus scoticus Stec, Morek, Gąsiorek, Blagden & Michalczyk, 2017
- Macrobiotus semmelweisi Pilato, Binda & Lisi, 2006
- Macrobiotus serratus Bertolani, Guidi & Rebecchi, 1996
- Macrobiotus seychellensis Biserov, 1994
- Macrobiotus shonaicus Stec, Arakawa & Michalczyk, 2018
- Macrobiotus siderophilus Bertolani et al., 2023
- Macrobiotus sottilei Pilato, Kiosya, Lisi & Sabella, 2012
- Macrobiotus terminalis Bertolani & Rebecchi, 1993
- Macrobiotus trunovae Biserov, Pilato & Lisi, 2011
- Macrobiotus vanescens Pilato, Binda & Catanzaro, 1991
- Macrobiotus vladimiri Bertolani, Biserov, Rebecchi & Cesari, 2011
- Macrobiotus wandae Kayastha, Berdi, Miaduchowska, Gawlak, Łukasiewicz, Gołdyn & Kaczmarek, 2020
- Macrobiotus wuyishanensis P. Zhang & X.-Z. Sun, 2014
- Macrobiotus yunshanensis Yang, 2002
