= Haplomacrobiotus =

Scientific classification
- Domain: Eukaryota
- Kingdom: Animalia
- Phylum: Tardigrada
- Class: Eutardigrada
- Order: Parachela
- Family: Calohypsibiidae
- Genus: Haplomacrobiotus; May, 1948

Genus of tardigrades

Haplomacrobiotus is a genus of tardigrades belonging to the family Calohypsibiidae.

Species:

- Haplomacrobiotus hermosillensis May, 1948
- Haplomacrobiotus utahensis Pilato & Beasley, 2005
