= Calohypsibiidae =

Scientific classification
- Domain: Eukaryota
- Kingdom: Animalia
- Phylum: Tardigrada
- Class: Eutardigrada
- Order: Parachela
- Family: Calohypsibiidae

Family of waterbears

Calohypsibiidae is a family of tardigrades belonging to the order Parachela.

Genera:

- Calohypsibius Thulin, 1928
- Haplohexapodibius Pilato & Beasley, 1987
- Haplomacrobiotus May, 1948
- Hexapodibius Pilato, 1969
- Parhexapodibius Pilato, 1969
