= Paradiphascon =

Scientific classification
- Kingdom: Animalia
- Phylum: Tardigrada
- Class: Eutardigrada
- Order: Parachela
- Family: Isohypsibiidae
- Genus: Paradiphascon; Dastych, 1992
- Species: P. manningi

Binomial name
- Paradiphascon manningi Dastych, 1992

Genus of tardigrades

Paradiphascon is a monotypic genus of tardigrades belonging to the family Isohypsibiidae. The only species is Paradiphascon manningi.

The species is found in South African Republic.
