= Macrobiotidae =

Scientific classification
- Kingdom: Animalia
- Phylum: Tardigrada
- Class: Eutardigrada
- Order: Parachela
- Superfamily: Macrobiotoidea
- Family: Macrobiotidae; Thulin, 1928

Type genus
- Macrobiotus C.A.S. Schultze, 1834

Family of tardigrades

Macrobiotidae is a family of tardigrades.

== Phylogeny ==
=== External phylogeny ===
According to a 2018 report using multiple morphological and molecular studies, the Macrobiotoidea are sister to the Hypsibioidea; both are eutardigrades. The genera Adorybiotus and Richtersius were transferred from Macrobiotidae to a new family, Richtersiidae, in 2016 (this name was preoccupied thus the new family was renamed to Richtersiusidae in 2021).

- Eutardigrada
  - - Apochela
      Milnesiidae
    - Parachela
      - Isohypsibiodea
      - - Macrobiotoidea
          - Macrobiotidae
          - Richtersiusidae
        - Hypsibioidea

=== Internal phylogeny ===
A 2021 phylogenetic analysis found that the genus Macrobiotus is monophyletic (a clade) but that the former genus Xerobiotus is wholly contained within Macrobiotus. A new genus, Sisubiotus, was created. The genus "Minibiotus" was seen to be paraphyletic with respect to Tenuibiotus and Paramacrobiotus.

- Macrobiotidae
  - - - Macrobiotus
      - Mesobiotus
    - Sisubiotus
  - - "Minibiotus" (part)
    - - "Minibiotus" (part)
      - - Tenuibiotus
        - Paramacrobiotus

== Genera ==
As of 2023, the family Macrobiotidae consists of the following genera:

- Biserovus Guidetti & Pilato, 2003
- Calcarobiotus Dastych, 1993
  - C. (Calcarobiotus) Dastych, 1993
  - C. (Discrepunguis) Guidetti & Bertolani, 2001
- Famelobiotus Pilato, Binda & Lisi, 2004
- Insuetifurca Guidetti & Pilato, 2003
- Macrobiotus C.A.S. Schultze, 1834
- Mesobiotus Vecchi et al., 2016
- Minibiotus R.O. Schuster, 1980
- Minilentus Guidetti & Pilato, 2003
- Paramacrobiotus Guidetti et al., 2009
- Pseudodiphascon Ramazzotti, 1965 (genus dubium)
- Pseudohexapodibius Bertolani & Biserov, 1996
- Schusterius Kaczmarek & Michalczyk, 2006
- Sisubiotus Stec, Vecchi, Calhim & Michalczyk, 2021
- Tenuibiotus Pilato & Lisi, 2011
- Xerobiotus Bertolani & Biserov, 1996
