= List of Polypedilum species =

These 624 species belong to Polypedilum, a genus of non-biting midges in the family Chironomidae.

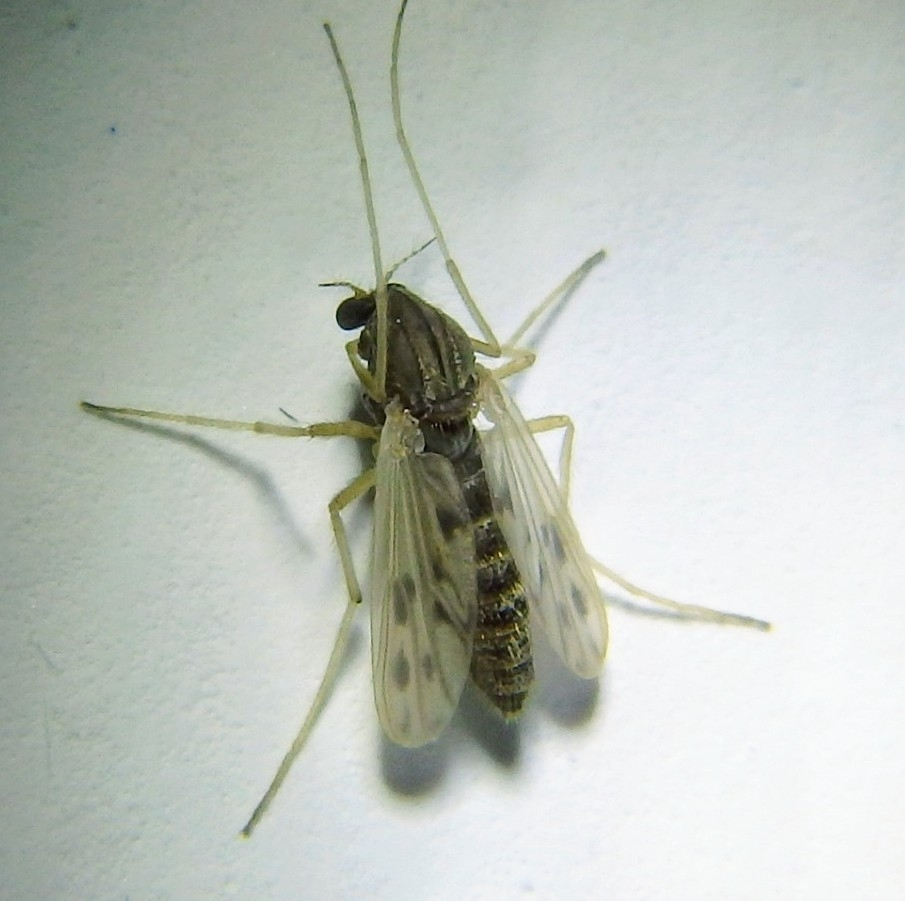
Polypedilum nubifer, Spain

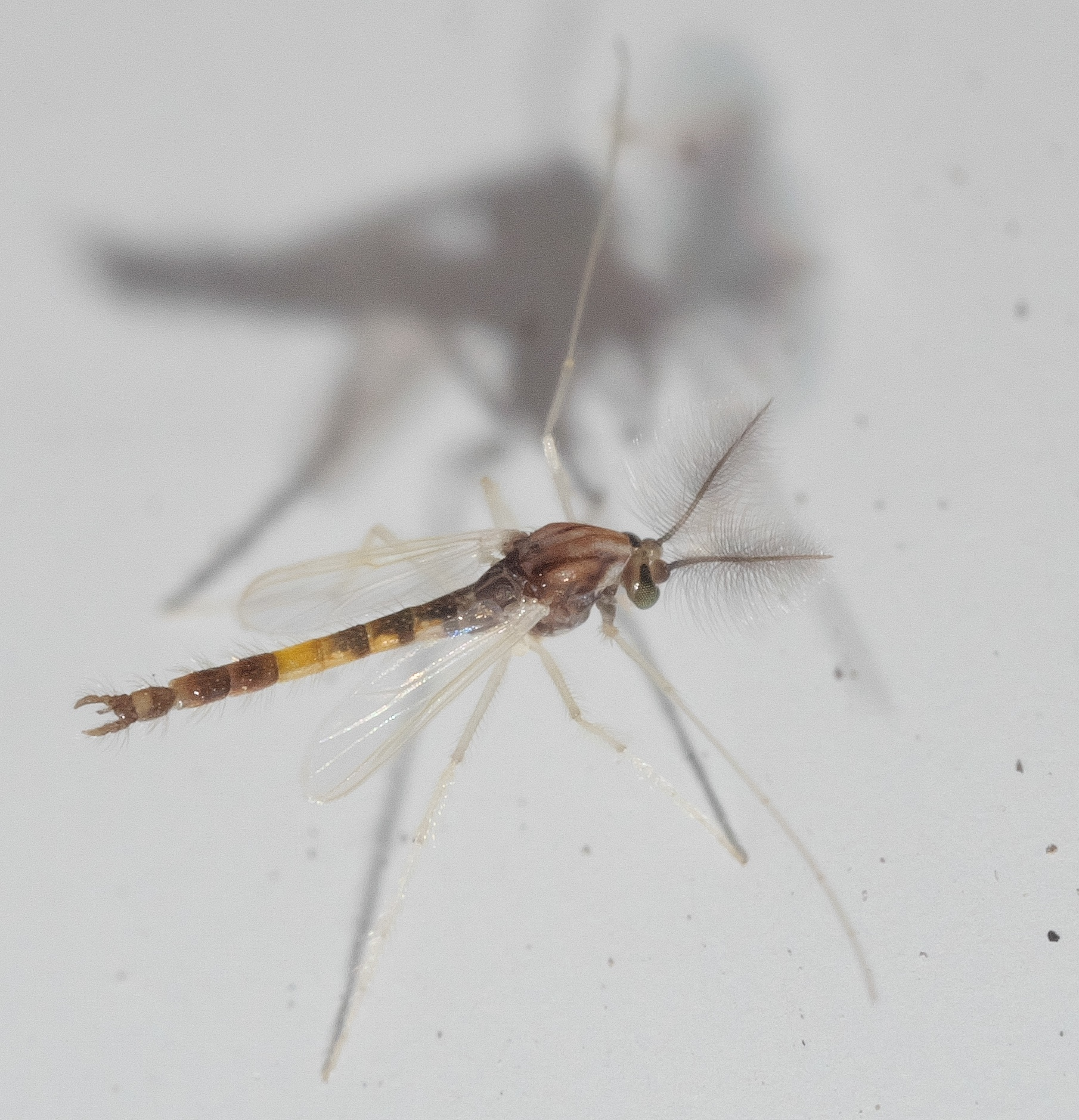
Polypedilum trigonus, Oklahoma

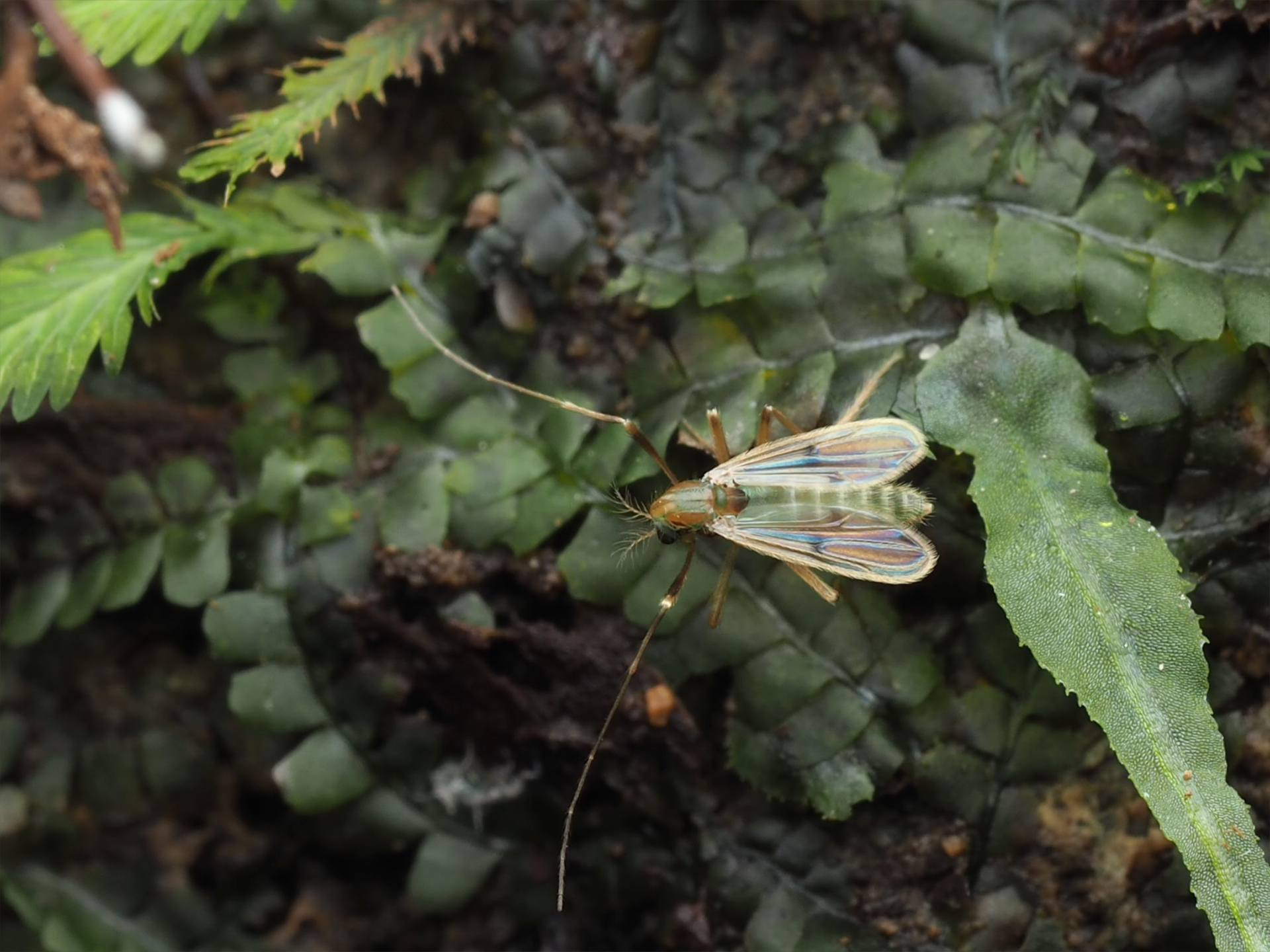
Polypedilum opimum, New Zealand

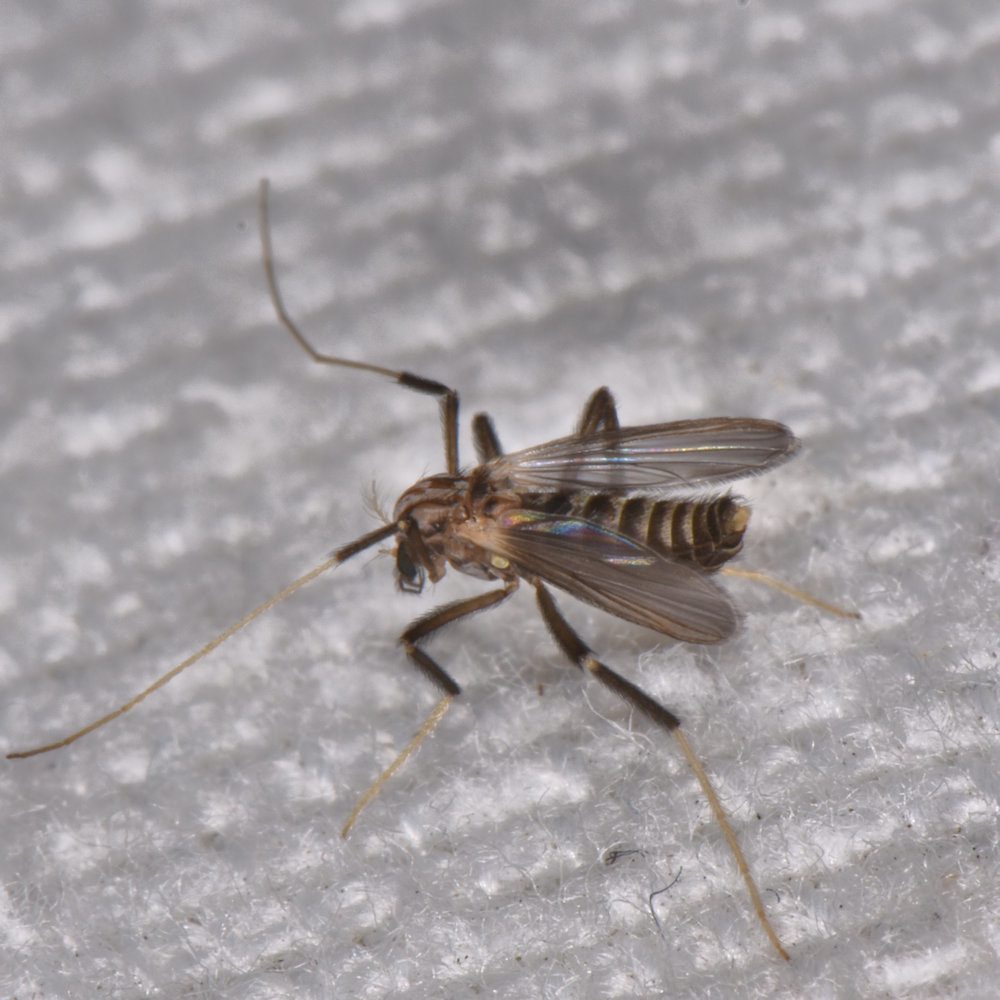
Polypedilum ontario, Canada

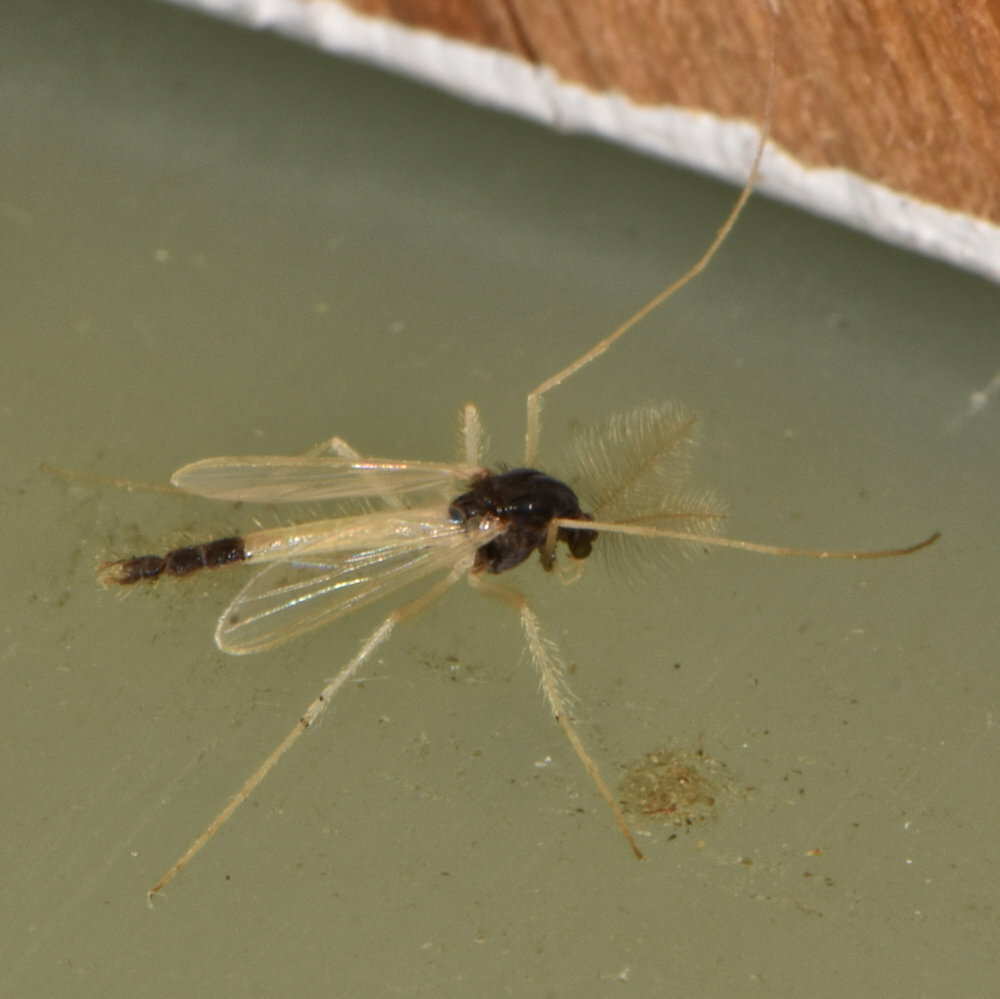
Polypedilum artifer, Canada

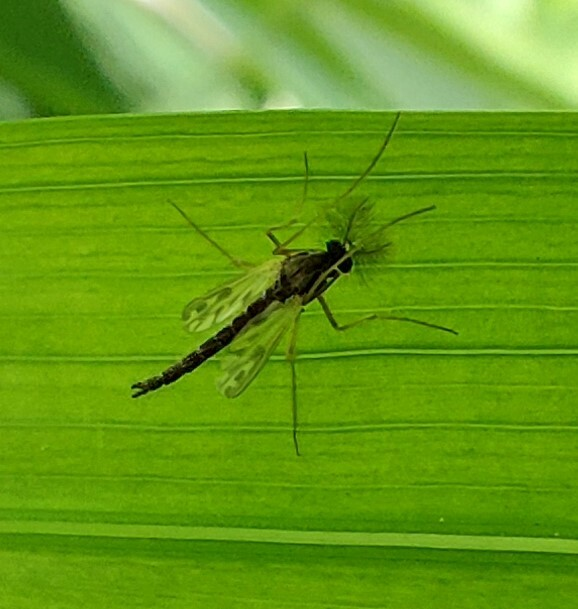
Polypedilum pavidum, New Zealand

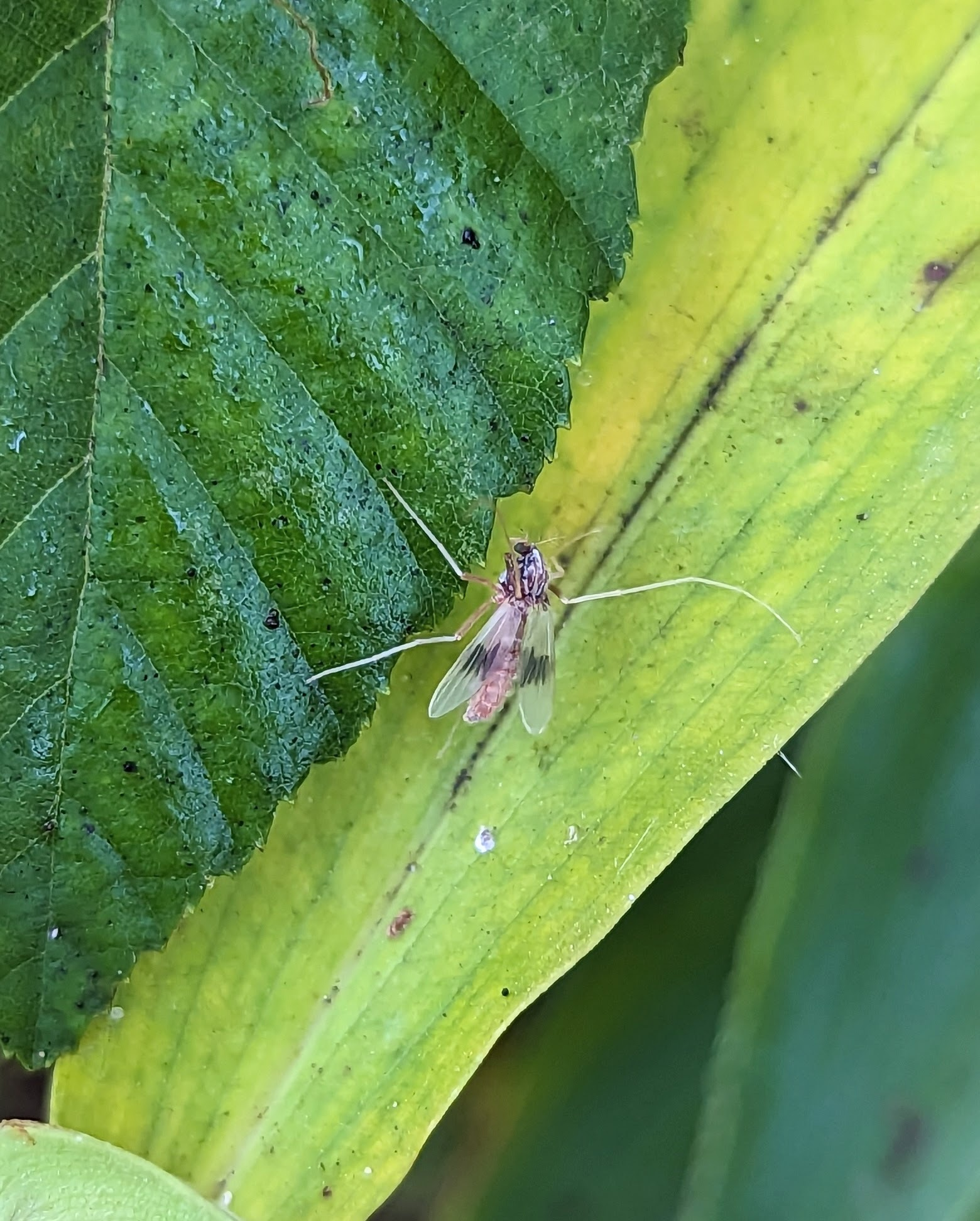
Polypedilum calopterus, Alabama

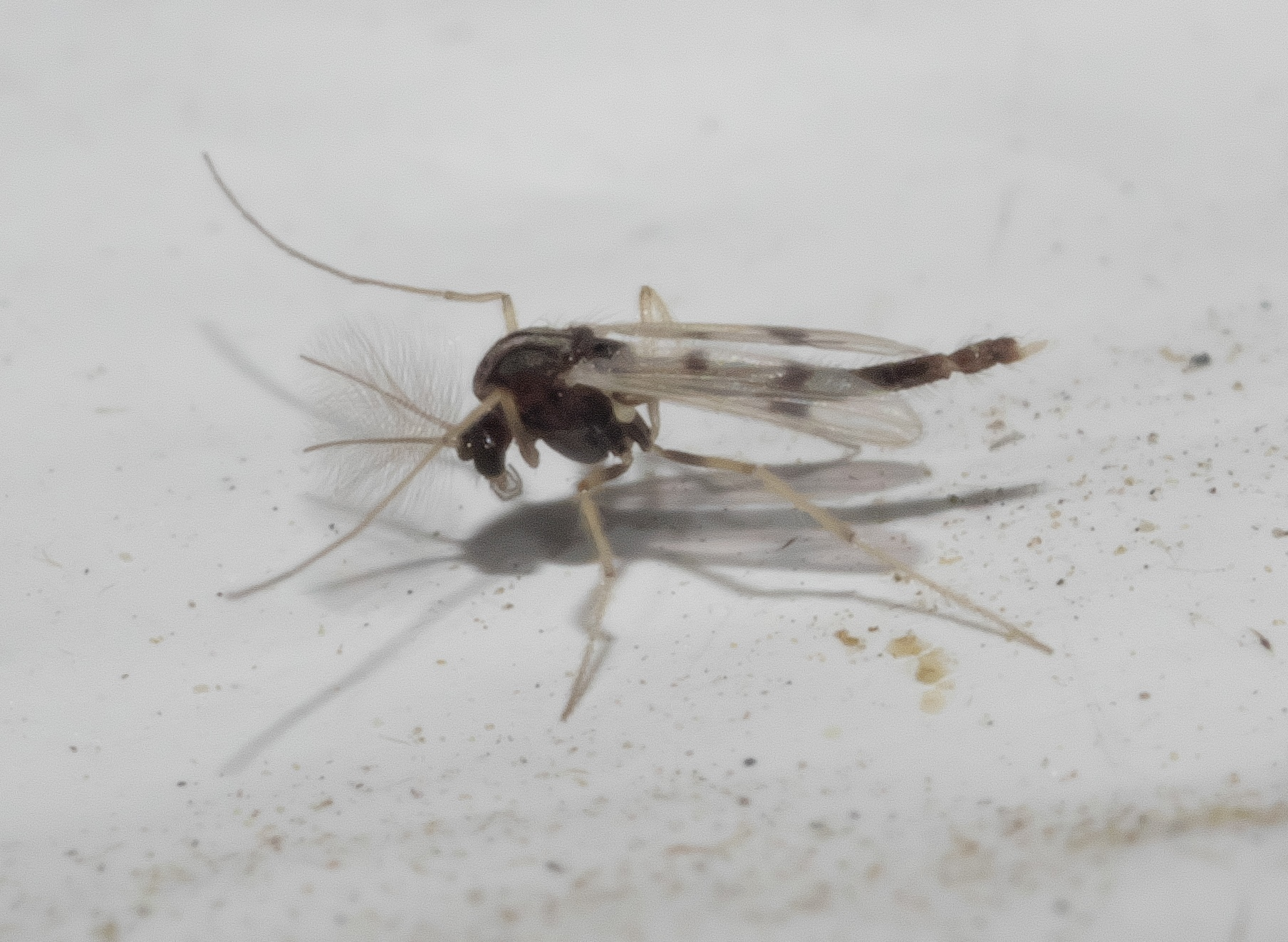
Polypedilum scalaenum, Oklahoma

== Polypedilum species ==
- Polypedilum aberrans Chernovsky, 1949
- Polypedilum aberufobrunneum Niitsuma, 1996
- Polypedilum absensilobum Zhang & Wang, 2016
- Polypedilum absentilobum Zhang & Wang, 2016
- Polypedilum abyssiniae Kieffer, 1918
- Polypedilum acifer Townes, 1945
- Polypedilum acristylum Yamamoto, Hirowatari & Yamamoto, 2012
- Polypedilum acutulum Oyewo & Saether, 1998
- Polypedilum acutum Kieffer, 1915
- Polypedilum adastalum Zhang & Wang, 2017
- Polypedilum aegyptium Kieffer, 1925
- Polypedilum aequabe Zhang & Wang, 2007
- Polypedilum aethiopis Lehmann, 1979
- Polypedilum aferum Lehmann, 1981
- Polypedilum akani Vårdal, Bjørlo & Saether, 2002
- Polypedilum akipulchrum Kawai, Okamoto & Imabayashi, 2002
- Polypedilum akisplendens Kawai, Inoue & Imabayashi, 1998
- Polypedilum albiceps (Johannsen, 1932)
- Polypedilum albicorne (Meigen, 1838)
- Polypedilum albicorpus Tokunaga, 1964
- Polypedilum albimanus
- Polypedilum albinodus Townes, 1945
- Polypedilum albipalpus Chaudhuri, Guha & Gupta, 1981
- Polypedilum albiventris Kawai, Inoue & Imabayashi, 1998
- Polypedilum alboguttatum Kieffer, 1921
- Polypedilum albonotatum Kieffer, 1920
- Polypedilum albosignatum Kieffer, 1925
- Polypedilum albulum Townes, 1945
- Polypedilum alixae Moubayed-Briel & Langton, 2022
- Polypedilum allansoni Freeman, 1958
- Polypedilum alternans Forsyth, 1971
- Polypedilum alticola Kieffer, 1913
- Polypedilum amataurum Bidawid-Kafka, 1996
- Polypedilum amoenum Goetghebuer, 1930
- Polypedilum amplificatum Vårdal, Bjørlo & Saether, 2002
- Polypedilum amputatum Vårdal, Bjørlo & Saether, 2002
- Polypedilum anale (Freeman, 1954)
- Polypedilum anderseni Oyewo & Saether, 1998
- Polypedilum angulum Maschwitz, 2000
- Polypedilum angustifoceps Kieffer, 1913
- Polypedilum angustum Townes, 1945
- Polypedilum anjarum Moubayed-Breil, 1989
- Polypedilum anningense Chen & Zhang, 2021
- Polypedilum annulatipes Kieffer, 1921
- Polypedilum annulatum Freeman, 1954
- Polypedilum aparai Bidawid & Fittkau, 1996
- Polypedilum apfelbecki (Strobl, 1900)
- Polypedilum apiaka Bidawid & Fittkau, 1996
- Polypedilum apicatum Townes, 1945
- Polypedilum apiculosetosum Zhang & Wang, 2016
- Polypedilum apiculusetosum Zhang & Wang
- Polypedilum appendiculatum Goetghebuer, 1939
- Polypedilum aramanus Moubayed & Mary, 2023
- Polypedilum arara Bidawid & Fittkau, 1996
- Polypedilum arcuatum Zhang & Wang, 2016
- Polypedilum argentinense Kieffer, 1925
- Polypedilum aripuana Bidawid-Kafka, 1996
- Polypedilum armatifrons (Kieffer, 1921)
- Polypedilum artifer (Curran, 1930)
- Polypedilum arua Bidawid-Kafka, 1996
- Polypedilum aruakan Bidawid & Fittkau, 1996
- Polypedilum arudinetum (Goetghebuer, 1921)
- Polypedilum asakawaense Sasa, 1980
- Polypedilum ascium Chaudhuri, Guha & Gupta, 1981
- Polypedilum asoprimum Sasa & Suzuki, 1991
- Polypedilum astictum Kieffer, 1920
- Polypedilum asurini Bidawid-Kafka, 1996
- Polypedilum atrichon Maschwitz, 2000
- Polypedilum atrinerve Kieffer, 1921
- Polypedilum atroari Bidawid-Kafka, 1996
- Polypedilum australotropicum Cranston, 2000
- Polypedilum aviceps Townes, 1945
- Polypedilum aymbere Shimabukuro & Trivinho-Strixino & Lamas, 2019
- Polypedilum bacalar Vinogradova, 2008
- Polypedilum baishanzuensis Song & Qi, 2021
- Polypedilum bakairi Bidawid & Fittkau, 1996
- Polypedilum baniva Bidawid & Fittkau, 1996
- Polypedilum barboyoni Serra-Tosio, 1981
- Polypedilum basilarum Zhang & Wang, 2004
- Polypedilum bellipes Kieffer, 1922
- Polypedilum benokiense Sasa & Hasegawa, 1988
- Polypedilum bergi Maschwitz, 2000
- Polypedilum bernardae Moubayed-Breil, 2020
- Polypedilum bicoloratum Freeman, 1961
- Polypedilum bicrenatum Kieffer, 1921
- Polypedilum bifalcatum Kieffer, 1921
- Polypedilum bifurcatum Cranston, 1989
- Polypedilum bilamella Zhang & Wang, 2016
- Polypedilum biloborum Chen & Zhang, 2021
- Polypedilum bingoparadoxum Kawai, Inoue & Imabayashi, 1998
- Polypedilum bipustulatum Freeman, 1958
- Polypedilum bisetosum Wang, 1995
- Polypedilum bisetosus Moubayed & Mary, 2023
- Polypedilum bispinum Zhang & Wang, 2007
- Polypedilum botiense Oyewo & Saether, 2008
- Polypedilum botosaneanui Oyewo & Saether, 2008
- Polypedilum branquinho Bidawid-Kafka, 1996
- Polypedilum braseniae (Leathers, 1922)
- Polypedilum brevipalpe Saether & Sundal, 1999
- Polypedilum breviplumosum Zhang & Wang, 2004
- Polypedilum brumale Kieffer, 1913
- Polypedilum brunneicornus (Kieffer, 1911)
- Polypedilum brunneofasciatum Zorina & Makarchenko, 2000
- Polypedilum buettikeri Cranston, 1989
- Polypedilum bulbocaudatum Saether & Sundal, 1999
- Polypedilum bullum Zhang & Wang, 2004
- Polypedilum caete Shimabukuro & Trivinho-Strixino & Lamas, 2019
- Polypedilum californicum Sublette, 1960
- Polypedilum callimorphum (Kieffer, 1911)
- Polypedilum calopterum (Mitchell, 1908)
- Polypedilum camposense Oyewo & Saether, 2008
- Polypedilum canoeiro Bidawid-Kafka, 1996
- Polypedilum canum Freeman, 1959
- Polypedilum carib Bidawid & Fittkau, 1996
- Polypedilum carijona Bidawid & Fittkau, 1996
- Polypedilum castornama Maschwitz, 2000
- Polypedilum caudoculum Kawai, 1991
- Polypedilum centisetum Hazra, Mazumdar & Chaudhuri, 2003
- Polypedilum centrale (Johannsen, 1932)
- Polypedilum chaudhurii Chaudhuri, Guha & Gupta, 1981
- Polypedilum chelum Vårdal, Bjørlo & Saether, 2002
- Polypedilum chiriguano Bidawid-Kafka, 1996
- Polypedilum chubetubeceum Sasa & Suzuki, 2001
- Polypedilum chubetucedeum Sasa & Suzuki, 2001
- Polypedilum chubetudeeum Sasa & Suzuki, 2001
- Polypedilum chutteri Harrison, 2001
- Polypedilum ciliatum Kieffer, 1922
- Polypedilum cinctum Townes, 1945
- Polypedilum circulum Chaudhuri & Chattopadhyay, 1990
- Polypedilum claudei Moubayed-Breil, 2020
- Polypedilum clavatum Kieffer, 1917
- Polypedilum clavigerum Kieffer, 1925
- Polypedilum clavistylus Sublette & Sasa, 1994
- Polypedilum coalitum Zhang & Wang, 2008
- Polypedilum cocama Bidawid-Kafka, 1996
- Polypedilum cochlearum Zhang & Wang, 2005
- Polypedilum concomitatum (Johannsen, 1932)
- Polypedilum conghuaense Zhang & Wang, 2016
- Polypedilum consobrinum Kieffer, 1916
- Polypedilum constrictum Zhang & Wang, 2017
- Polypedilum convexum (Johannsen, 1932)
- Polypedilum convictum (Walker, 1856)
- Polypedilum corniger Sublette & Sasa, 1994
- Polypedilum cranstoni Cornette, Motitsoe & Mlambo, 2022
- Polypedilum crassiglobum Zhang & Wang, 2004
- Polypedilum crassistyla Kawai, Inoue & Imabayashi, 1998
- Polypedilum crassum Maschwitz, 2000
- Polypedilum crenulosum Kieffer, 1921
- Polypedilum cultellatum Goetghebuer, 1931
- Polypedilum cumberi Freeman, 1959
- Polypedilum cyclus Zhang & Wang, 2005
- Polypedilum cypellum Qi, Zhang & Wang, 2014
- Polypedilum czernyi Vimmer, 1934
- Polypedilum dagombae Vårdal, Bjørlo & Saether, 2002
- Polypedilum daitobeceus (Sasa & Suzuki, 2001)
- Polypedilum daitojekeum (Sasa & Suzuki, 2001)
- Polypedilum daitokeleum (Sasa & Suzuki, 2001)
- Polypedilum daitoneoum Sasa & Suzuki, 2001
- Polypedilum dangsanense Bjorlo, 2002
- Polypedilum darwini Baranov, Pinho, Roszkowska & Kaczmarek, 2020
- Polypedilum decematoguttatum (Tokunaga, 1938)
- Polypedilum decemmaculatum Kieffer, 1920
- Polypedilum declive (Kieffer, 1922)
- Polypedilum deletum Goetghebuer, 1936
- Polypedilum dengae Zhang & Wang, 2016
- Polypedilum depile Zhang & Wang, 2008
- Polypedilum dewulfi Goetghebuer, 1936
- Polypedilum dickebuschense Goetghebuer, 1936
- Polypedilum digitifer Townes, 1945
- Polypedilum digitulum Freeman, 1959
- Polypedilum dilatum Zhang & Wang, 2004
- Polypedilum dimidiatum Kieffer, 1925
- Polypedilum discaudata (Amakye, 1995)
- Polypedilum dissimilum Yamamoto & Yamamoto, 2015
- Polypedilum dossenudum Oyewo & Saether, 1998
- Polypedilum dubium (Kieffer, 1921)
- Polypedilum dudichi Berczik, 1957
- Polypedilum dybasi Tokunaga, 1964
- Polypedilum edense Ree & Kim, 1981
- Polypedilum elongatum Tokunaga, 1964
- Polypedilum enshiense Song & Wang, 2017
- Polypedilum ephippium Freeman, 1958
- Polypedilum epleri Oyewo & Jacobsen, 2007
- Polypedilum epomis Sublette & Sasa, 1994
- Polypedilum esakii (Tokunaga, 1964)
- Polypedilum ewei Vårdal, Bjørlo & Saether, 2002
- Polypedilum excelsius Townes, 1945
- Polypedilum exilicaudatum Saether & Sundal, 1999
- Polypedilum exsectum (Kieffer, 1916)
- Polypedilum falcatum Zhang, Song, Wang & Wang, 2015
- Polypedilum falciforme Maschwitz, 2000
- Polypedilum fallax (Johannsen, 1905)
- Polypedilum famibeceum (Sasa, 1996)
- Polypedilum famicedeum Sasa, 1996
- Polypedilum famideeum Sasa, 1996
- Polypedilum fanjingense Zhang & Wang, 2005
- Polypedilum fasciatipenne (Kieffer, 1910)
- Polypedilum feridae Bidawid-Kafka, 1996
- Polypedilum festivipenne Kieffer, 1920
- Polypedilum flavescens (Johannsen, 1932)
- Polypedilum flavipes Kieffer, 1920
- Polypedilum flaviscapus Kieffer, 1922
- Polypedilum flavoviride Goetghebuer, 1939
- Polypedilum floridense Townes, 1945
- Polypedilum fodiens (Kieffer, 1916)
- Polypedilum francisae Namayandeh & Vasquez, 2026
- Polypedilum freemani Oyewo & Saether, 1998
- Polypedilum fulgidum Kieffer, 1921
- Polypedilum furudosecundum (Sasa & Arakawa, 1994)
- Polypedilum fuscipennis (Meigen, 1818)
- Polypedilum fuscovittatum Kawai, Inoue & Imabayashi, 1998
- Polypedilum fuscum Freeman, 1954
- Polypedilum ge Bidawid & Fittkau, 1996
- Polypedilum genesareth Kieffer, 1915
- Polypedilum genpeiense Niitsuma, 1996
- Polypedilum ginzangeheum Sasa & Suzuki, 2001
- Polypedilum ginzanheium Sasa & Suzuki, 2001
- Polypedilum ginzanijeum Sasa & Suzuki, 2001
- Polypedilum ginzanprimum Sasa & Suzuki, 1998
- Polypedilum ginzansecundum Sasa & Suzuki, 1998
- Polypedilum ginzantertium Sasa & Suzuki, 1998
- Polypedilum glabripenne (Kieffer, 1911)
- Polypedilum gladysae Oyewo & Saether, 1998
- Polypedilum goiocoio Shimabukuro & Trivinho-Strixino & Lamas, 2019
- Polypedilum gomphus Townes, 1945
- Polypedilum gosikisecundum Sasa, 1993
- Polypedilum griseistriatum (Edwards, 1931)
- Polypedilum griseoguttatum Kieffer, 1921
- Polypedilum griseopunctatum (Malloch, 1915)
- Polypedilum guarani Bidawid-Kafka, 1996
- Polypedilum guato Pinho, Fusari & Lamas, 2015
- Polypedilum guianensis Moubayed, 2025
- Polypedilum gunmaabeum Sasa & Suzuki, 2001
- Polypedilum hainanense Zhang & Wang, 2008
- Polypedilum halterale (Coquillett, 1901)
- Polypedilum hamigerum Kieffer, 1925
- Polypedilum harrisi Freeman, 1959
- Polypedilum harrisoni Oyewo & Saether, 1998
- Polypedilum harteni Andersen & Mendes, 2010
- Polypedilum hastaferum Harrison, 2001
- Polypedilum henicurum Wang, 1995
- Polypedilum heptasticum Kieffer, 1922
- Polypedilum heptatomum Kieffer, 1920
- Polypedilum hexastictum Kieffer, 1920
- Polypedilum hiroshimaense Kawai & Sasa, 1985
- Polypedilum hirsuta (Goetghebuer, 1936)
- Polypedilum hirticoxa (Johannsen, 1932)
- Polypedilum hirtiforceps (Kieffer, 1926)
- Polypedilum hirtimanum Kieffer, 1915
- Polypedilum huapingensis Liu & Liu, 2021
- Polypedilum humile Kieffer, 1924
- Polypedilum illinoense (Malloch, 1915)
- Polypedilum inaijeum Sasa, Kitami & Suzuki, 2001
- Polypedilum inajekeum Sasa, Kitami & Suzuki, 2001
- Polypedilum inawadeeum Sasa, Kitami & Suzuki, 2000
- Polypedilum inawaefeum Sasa, Kitami & Suzuki, 2000
- Polypedilum inawafegeum Sasa, Kitami & Suzuki, 2000
- Polypedilum inawageheum Sasa, Kitami & Suzuki, 2000
- Polypedilum incoloripenne Goetghebuer, 1936
- Polypedilum infundibulum Zhang & Wang, 2004
- Polypedilum insolitum Chaudhuri, Guha & Gupta, 1981
- Polypedilum insulanum Tokunaga, 1964
- Polypedilum integrum Kieffer, 1921
- Polypedilum intermedium Albu & Botnariuc, 1966
- Polypedilum intuber Oyewo & Saether, 2008
- Polypedilum irapirapi Bidawid-Kafka, 1996
- Polypedilum iricolor Kieffer, 1916
- Polypedilum iridis (Kieffer, 1911)
- Polypedilum iriofegeum Sasa & Suzuki, 2000
- Polypedilum iriogeheum Sasa & Suzuki, 2000
- Polypedilum isigabeceum Sasa & Suzuki, 2000
- Polypedilum isocerus Townes, 1945
- Polypedilum itatiaia Shimabukuro, Pepinelli & Trivinho-Strixino, 2017
- Polypedilum japonicum (Tokunaga, 1938)
- Polypedilum javanum Kruseman, 1939
- Polypedilum jawaperi Bidawid & Fittkau, 1996
- Polypedilum jianfengense Song & Wang, 2017
- Polypedilum jii Zhang & Wang, 2005
- Polypedilum johannseni Sublette & Sublette, 1973
- Polypedilum jokasecundum (Sasa & Ogata, 1999)
- Polypedilum juruna Bidawid-Kafka, 1996
- Polypedilum kadiweu Pinho, Fusari & Lamas, 2015
- Polypedilum kaingangi Pinho, Mendes et Andersen
- Polypedilum kajapo Bidawid & Fittkau, 1996
- Polypedilum kakumense Oyewo & Saether, 1998
- Polypedilum kamajura Bidawid-Kafka, 1996
- Polypedilum kamosecundum Sasa, 1989
- Polypedilum kamotertium Sasa, 1989
- Polypedilum karaja Bidawid-Kafka, 1996
- Polypedilum karyana Bidawid & Fittkau, 1996
- Polypedilum kasumiense (Sasa, 1979)
- Polypedilum kaxuyana Bidawid & Fittkau, 1996
- Polypedilum kibatiense Goetghebuer, 1936
- Polypedilum kisonudum Sasa & Kondo, 1993
- Polypedilum kobotokense Sasa, 1981
- Polypedilum kuikuro Bidawid & Fittkau, 1996
- Polypedilum kunigamiense Sasa & Hasegawa, 1988
- Polypedilum kurobenudum Sasa & Okazawa, 1992
- Polypedilum kurobepallidum Sasa & Okazawa, 1992
- Polypedilum kyotoense (Tokunaga, 1938)
- Polypedilum labeculosum (Mitchell, 1908)
- Polypedilum laetipenne Kieffer, 1920
- Polypedilum laetum (Meigen, 1818)
- Polypedilum laterale Goetghebuer, 1936
- Polypedilum lateralum Zhang & Wang, 2004
- Polypedilum leei Freeman, 1961
- Polypedilum lehmanni Oyewo & Saether, 1998
- Polypedilum lene (Becker, 1908)
- Polypedilum leopoldi Goetghebuer, 1932
- Polypedilum leptovolsellae Ree, 2009
- Polypedilum leucopterum Kieffer, 1922
- Polypedilum lichuanense Wang, 1994
- Polypedilum limnophilum Kieffer, 1920
- Polypedilum limpidum (Johannsen, 1932)
- Polypedilum lineatum Chaudhuri, Guha & Gupta, 1981
- Polypedilum litorale (Chernovsky, 1949)
- Polypedilum lobiferum Freeman, 1954 (North End Midge)
- Polypedilum longicrus Kieffer, 1921
- Polypedilum longiforceps Kieffer, 1921
- Polypedilum longiligulatum (Yamamoto, Yamamoto & Tang, 2018)
- Polypedilum longinerve (Kieffer, 1922)
- Polypedilum longiventris (Kieffer, 1922)
- Polypedilum lotense Moubayed-Breil, 2007
- Polypedilum lucidum Chaudhuri, Guha & Gupta, 1981
- Polypedilum luteopede Sublette & Sasa, 1994
- Polypedilum luteum Forsyth, 1971
- Polypedilum macrohemisphere Ree, 2012
- Polypedilum maculatum Zorina & Makarchenko, 2000
- Polypedilum maculipennatum Yamamoto, Yamamoto & Hirowatari, 2012
- Polypedilum maculipes Goetghebuer, 1933
- Polypedilum majiis Lehmann, 1979
- Polypedilum majus Kieffer, 1922
- Polypedilum malickianum Cranston, 1989
- Polypedilum marauia Bidawid-Kafka, 1996
- Polypedilum marsafae Ghonaim, Ali & Osheibah, 2005
- Polypedilum masoni Sublette
- Polypedilum masudai (Tokunaga, 1938)
- Polypedilum mayrahu Pinho & Silva, 2020
- Polypedilum medium Zhang & Wang, 2004
- Polypedilum medivittatum Tokunaga, 1964
- Polypedilum mehinaku Bidawid & Fittkau, 1996
- Polypedilum melanophilum (Kieffer, 1911)
- Polypedilum mellense (Goetghebuer, 1942)
- Polypedilum mengmanense Zhang & Wang, 2016
- Polypedilum mercantourus Moubayed-Breil, 2017
- Polypedilum miagense Niitsuma, 1991
- Polypedilum microzoster Sublette & Sasa, 1994
- Polypedilum milnei Kieffer, 1913
- Polypedilum mina Shimabukuro, Pepinelli & Trivinho-Strixino, 2017
- Polypedilum minimum Lin, Qi, Zhang & Wang, 2013
- Polypedilum misumaiquartum Sasa & Suzuki, 1998
- Polypedilum misumaitertium Sasa & Suzuki, 1998
- Polypedilum miyakoense Hasegawa & Sasa, 1987
- Polypedilum mongollemeus Sasa & Suzuki, 1997
- Polypedilum monodentatum Konstantinov, 1948
- Polypedilum monostictum Kieffer, 1916
- Polypedilum moubayedbreili Ashe & O’Connor, 2015
- Polypedilum msarcondesi Pinho & Mendes, 2010
- Polypedilum mundurucu Bidawid-Kafka, 1996
- Polypedilum muscicola (Kieffer, 1924)
- Polypedilum nahukuwa Bidawid & Fittkau, 1996
- Polypedilum napahaiense Zhang & Wang, 2016
- Polypedilum natalense (Kieffer, 1918)
- Polypedilum nazarovae Vinogradova, 2008
- Polypedilum neocaledonicus Moubayed & Mary, 2023
- Polypedilum neoperturbans Ree, 2009
- Polypedilum newaygo Taber, 2009
- Polypedilum nigribasale Tokunaga, 1964
- Polypedilum nigritum Townes, 1945
- Polypedilum notabile Yamamoto, Yamamoto & Hirowatari, 2012
- Polypedilum nubeculosum (Meigen, 1804)
- Polypedilum nubiferum (Skuse, 1889)
- Polypedilum nubilum Yamamoto, Yamamoto & Hirowatari, 2012
- Polypedilum nudiceps Chaudhuri, Guha & Gupta, 1981
- Polypedilum nudifer Skuse, 1889
- Polypedilum nudigracile Yamamoto, Yamamoto & Hirowatari, 2016
- Polypedilum nudimanum Kieffer, 1915
- Polypedilum nudiprostatum Zhang, Wang & Saether, 2006
- Polypedilum numerum Chaudhuri, Guha & Gupta, 1981
- Polypedilum nuzeprimum Sasa, 1996
- Polypedilum nuzesecundum Sasa, 1996
- Polypedilum nymphaeorum Maschwitz, 2000
- Polypedilum obelos Sublette & Sasa, 1994
- Polypedilum obliteratum Kieffer, 1920
- Polypedilum obscurum Guha & Chaudhuri, 1982
- Polypedilum obtusum Townes, 1945
- Polypedilum octoguttatus (Tokunaga, 1936)
- Polypedilum octopunctatum (Thunberg, 1784)
- Polypedilum octosema Kieffer, 1922
- Polypedilum ogoouense Vårdal, Bjørlo & Saether, 2002
- Polypedilum okiflavum Sasa, 1990
- Polypedilum okigrandis Sasa, 1993
- Polypedilum okiharaki Sasa, 1990
- Polypedilum okipallidum Sasa, 1990
- Polypedilum okueima Bidawid-Kafka, 1996
- Polypedilum ontario (Walley, 1926)
- Polypedilum opacum Kieffer, 1920
- Polypedilum ophioides Townes, 1945
- Polypedilum opimum (Hutton, 1902)
- Polypedilum oresitrophum (Skuse, 1889)
- Polypedilum ornatipenne (Kieffer, 1918)
- Polypedilum ornatipes Kieffer, 1924
- Polypedilum ovahimba Cranston, 2014
- Polypedilum palauense Tokunaga, 1964
- Polypedilum palliventre Freeman, 1961
- Polypedilum paludosum Zorina & Makarchenko, 2000
- Polypedilum panacu Mendes, Andersen & Jocqué, 2011
- Polypedilum paraconvexum Zhang & Wang, 2005
- Polypedilum paraconvictum Yamamoto, Yamamoto & Hirowatari, 2015
- Polypedilum paracyclum Qi & Song, 2020
- Polypedilum parallelum Zhang & Wang, 2016
- Polypedilum paranigrum Kawai, Inoue & Imabayashi, 1998
- Polypedilum paranubifer Cranston, 2016
- Polypedilum parapicatum Niitsuma, 1991
- Polypedilum parascalaenum Beck, 1962
- Polypedilum paraviceps Niitsuma, 1992
- Polypedilum pardus Townes, 1945
- Polypedilum parthenogeneticum Donato & Paggi, 2008
- Polypedilum parviacumen Kawai & Sasa, 1985
- Polypedilum parvum Townes, 1945
- Polypedilum patens (Walker, 1856)
- Polypedilum patulum Vårdal, Bjørlo & Saether, 2002
- Polypedilum paucisetum Zhang, Wang & Saether, 2006
- Polypedilum paulusi Bidawid-Kafka, 1996
- Polypedilum pavidum (Hutton, 1902)
- Polypedilum pedatum Townes, 1945
- Polypedilum pelostolum Kieffer, 1912
- Polypedilum pembai Cornette, Yamamoto, Yamamoto, Kobayashi, Petrova, Gusev, Shimura, Kikawada, Pemba & Okuda, 2017
- Polypedilum perturbans (Johannsen, 1932)
- Polypedilum pharao Kieffer, 1925
- Polypedilum phre Kieffer, 1925
- Polypedilum pictipes (Zetterstedt, 1850)
- Polypedilum plautum Oyewo & Saether, 1998
- Polypedilum ploenense Kieffer, 1922
- Polypedilum pollicium Zhang & Wang, 2016
- Polypedilum ponapense Tokunaga, 1964
- Polypedilum praegnans Oyewo & Saether, 1998
- Polypedilum prasiogaster Freeman, 1961
- Polypedilum procerum Zhang, Song, Wang & Wang, 2015
- Polypedilum prolixipartum Maschwitz, 2000
- Polypedilum prolixum Mukherjee, Ray, Mukherjee, Naksar & Banerjee, 2024
- Polypedilum prominens Zhang & Wang, 2004
- Polypedilum pruina Freeman, 1954
- Polypedilum pruinosum Goetghebuer, 1934
- Polypedilum pseudacifer Zorina & Makarchenko, 2000
- Polypedilum pseudamoenum Moubayed-Breil, 1992
- Polypedilum pseudoconvictum Bidawid-Kafka, 1996
- Polypedilum pseudoflagellatum Chaudhuri, Guha & Gupta, 1981
- Polypedilum pseudoiris Gromov, 1951
- Polypedilum pseudomasudai Kawai, Inoue & Imabayashi, 1998
- Polypedilum pseudoscalaenum Vimmer, 1934
- Polypedilum pseudosordens Zhang & Wang, 2005
- Polypedilum pterospilum Townes, 1945
- Polypedilum pulchripes (Meijere, 1924)
- Polypedilum pulchrum Albu, 1980
- Polypedilum pulchum Townes, 1945
- Polypedilum pullum (Zetterstedt, 1838)
- Polypedilum puri Pinho, Fusari & Lamas, 2015
- Polypedilum purimanus Kieffer, 1913
- Polypedilum purus Bidawid-Kafka, 1996
- Polypedilum pygmaeum (Kieffer, 1921)
- Polypedilum quadrifarium (Kieffer, 1922)
- Polypedilum quadriguttatum Kieffer, 1921
- Polypedilum quadrimaculatum (Meigen, 1838)
- Polypedilum quasinubifer Cranston, 2016
- Polypedilum quinqueguttatum Kieffer, 1921
- Polypedilum quinquesetosum (Edwards, 1931)
- Polypedilum ramiferum Kieffer, 1921
- Polypedilum rectangulum Hazra, Sanyal & Brahma, 2016
- Polypedilum reei Oyewo & Saether, 2008
- Polypedilum retusum Mukherjee, Mukherjee & Hazra, 2020
- Polypedilum rissi Vinogradova, 2008
- Polypedilum robusticeps (Guha & Chaudhuri, 1985)
- Polypedilum rohneri Vinogradova, 2008
- Polypedilum rufomarginale Chaudhuri, Guha & Gupta, 1981
- Polypedilum sabbuhi Bidawid-Kafka, 1996
- Polypedilum saetheri Moubayed-Breil, 2007
- Polypedilum saetosum Lehmann, 1981
- Polypedilum sagittiferum (Tokunaga, 1938)
- Polypedilum sahariense Kieffer, 1926
- Polypedilum salavoni Bidawid-Kafka, 1996
- Polypedilum salwiti Bidawid-Kafka, 1996
- Polypedilum sate Kieffer, 1925
- Polypedilum sauteri Kieffer, 1921
- Polypedilum scalaenulum (Edwards, 1932)
- Polypedilum scalaenum (Schrank, 1803)
- Polypedilum scharfi Vinogradova, 2008
- Polypedilum scirpicola (Kieffer, 1921)
- Polypedilum scutellare Kieffer, 1922
- Polypedilum seorsum (Skuse, 1889)
- Polypedilum shangujuense Wang, 1994
- Polypedilum shirokanense (Sasa, 1979)
- Polypedilum shoufuscum Sasa, 1989
- Polypedilum siamense Moubayed-Breil, 1989
- Polypedilum sibadeeum Sasa, Sumita & Suzuki, 1999
- Polypedilum sibiricum Goetghebuer, 1933
- Polypedilum sidoniense Moubayed-Breil, 1989
- Polypedilum silhouettarium Saether, 2004
- Polypedilum simantoheium Sasa, Suzuki & Sakai, 1998
- Polypedilum simantoijeum Sasa, Suzuki & Sakai, 1998
- Polypedilum simantokeleum Sasa, Suzuki & Sakai, 1998
- Polypedilum simulans Townes, 1945
- Polypedilum simulator Kieffer, 1917
- Polypedilum sofiae Pinho & Silva, 2020
- Polypedilum solimoes Bidawid-Kafka, 1996
- Polypedilum sordens (Wulp, 1875)
- Polypedilum spadix Tokunaga, 1964
- Polypedilum sparganii (Kieffer, 1913)
- Polypedilum spathum Zhang & Wang, 2007
- Polypedilum spiesi Vinogradova, 2008
- Polypedilum spinalveum Vårdal, Bjørlo & Saether, 2002
- Polypedilum spinibojum Oyewo & Saether, 1998
- Polypedilum stephani Lehmann, 1981
- Polypedilum stictopternum Kieffer, 1920
- Polypedilum stictopterum (Kieffer, 1921)
- Polypedilum stratiotis (Kieffer, 1909)
- Polypedilum stuckenbergi Freeman, 1961
- Polypedilum subconfluens (Kieffer, 1922)
- Polypedilum subovatum Freeman, 1958
- Polypedilum subscultellatum Sublette, 1960
- Polypedilum subulatum Saether & Sundal, 1999
- Polypedilum sudagaiabeum Sasa & Tanaka, 2001
- Polypedilum sudagaiopeum Sasa & Tanaka, 2001
- Polypedilum sukayuprimum Sasa, 1991
- Polypedilum sulaceps Townes, 1945
- Polypedilum surugense Niitsuma, 1992
- Polypedilum suturale (Johannsen, 1932)
- Polypedilum taishobeceum Sasa & Tanaka, 2001
- Polypedilum taishocedeum Sasa & Tanaka, 2001
- Polypedilum takaoense Sasa, 1980
- Polypedilum tamagohanum Sasa, 1983
- Polypedilum tamagoryoense Sasa, 1980
- Polypedilum tamaharaki Sasa, 1983
- Polypedilum tamahinoense Sasa, 1983
- Polypedilum tamahosohige Sasa, 1983
- Polypedilum tamanigrum Sasa, 1983
- Polypedilum tamasemusi Sasa, 1983
- Polypedilum tana Cranston & Judd, 1989
- Polypedilum tananense Sasa & Hasegawa, 1988
- Polypedilum tenue (Kieffer, 1921)
- Polypedilum tenuitarse (Kieffer, 1922)
- Polypedilum tesfayi Harrison, 1996
- Polypedilum tetrachaetum (Goetghebuer, 1919)
- Polypedilum tetracrenatum Hirvenoja, 1962
- Polypedilum tetrasema Kieffer, 1922
- Polypedilum tetrastictum Kieffer, 1920
- Polypedilum tiberiadis Kieffer, 1915
- Polypedilum tigrinum (Hashimoto, 1983)
- Polypedilum tirio Bidawid & Fittkau, 1996
- Polypedilum tissamaharense Oyewo & Saether, 2008
- Polypedilum tissoti Moubayed-Breil & Langton, 2020
- Polypedilum titicacae Roback & Coffman, 1983
- Polypedilum tobaoctavum Kikuchi & Sasa, 1990
- Polypedilum tobaseptimum Kikuchi & Sasa, 1990
- Polypedilum tobaundecimum Kikuchi & Sasa, 1990
- Polypedilum tochibicolor Niitsuma, 1991
- Polypedilum toganudum Sasa & Okazawa, 1991
- Polypedilum togapallidum Sasa & Okazawa, 1991
- Polypedilum tokaraheium Sasa & Suzuki, 1995
- Polypedilum tokaraijeum Sasa & Suzuki, 1995
- Polypedilum tokunagai Sasa & Suzuki, 1995
- Polypedilum tonewbeceum Sasa & Tanaka, 2002
- Polypedilum tonewekeum Sasa & Tanaka, 2002
- Polypedilum tonnoiri Freeman, 1961
- Polypedilum toyamadeeum (Sasa, 1996)
- Polypedilum trapezium Zhang & Wang, 2016
- Polypedilum tridens Freeman, 1955
- Polypedilum tridentatum Konstantinov, 1952
- Polypedilum trigonum Townes, 1945
- Polypedilum trinimaculum (Tokunaga, 1940)
- Polypedilum tripartitus (Kieffer, 1910)
- Polypedilum tripunctum Chaudhuri, Guha & Gupta, 1981
- Polypedilum tristictum Kieffer, 1920
- Polypedilum tritum (Walker, 1856)
- Polypedilum trombetas Bidawid-Kafka, 1996
- Polypedilum tropicum Kieffer, 1913
- Polypedilum trukense (Tokunaga, 1940)
- Polypedilum tsukubaense (Sasa, 1979)
- Polypedilum tuberculatum (Tokunaga, 1940)
- Polypedilum tuberculum Maschwitz, 2000
- Polypedilum tuburcinatum Andersen et Bello Gonzalez
- Polypedilum tupi Bidawid-Kafka, 1996
- Polypedilum tusimaefeum (Sasa & Suzuki, 1999)
- Polypedilum tusimafegeum (Sasa & Suzuki, 1999)
- Polypedilum tusimageheum Sasa & Suzuki, 1999
- Polypedilum tusimaheium Sasa & Suzuki, 1999
- Polypedilum tusimaijeum Sasa & Suzuki, 1999
- Polypedilum txicao Bidawid & Fittkau, 1996
- Polypedilum udominutum Niitsuma, 1992
- Polypedilum umayo Roback & Coffman, 1983
- Polypedilum unagiquartum Sasa, 1985
- Polypedilum unagitertium (Sasa, 1994)
- Polypedilum uncinatum (Goetghebuer, 1921)
- Polypedilum unifascia (Tokunaga, 1938)
- Polypedilum unifasciatum Kieffer, 1922
- Polypedilum vanderplanki Hinton, 1951 (Sleeping Chironomid)
- Polypedilum variegatum Goetghebuer, 1931
- Polypedilum vectum (Johannsen, 1932)
- Polypedilum vespertinum (Skuse, 1889)
- Polypedilum vibex Townes, 1945
- Polypedilum villcanotum Roback & Coffman, 1983
- Polypedilum vogesiacum Goetghebuer, 1944
- Polypedilum volselligum Saether & Sundal, 1999
- Polypedilum walleyi Townes, 1945
- Polypedilum watsoni Freeman, 1961
- Polypedilum wayana Bidawid & Fittkau, 1996
- Polypedilum wirthi Freeman, 1961
- Polypedilum xamatari Bidawid & Fittkau, 1996
- Polypedilum xavante Bidawid & Fittkau, 1996
- Polypedilum xianjuensis Qi, Zhang, Zhu & Wang, 2016
- Polypedilum xiborena Bidawid-Kafka, 1996
- Polypedilum xuei Zhang & Wang, 2004
- Polypedilum yakubeceum Sasa & Suzuki, 2000
- Polypedilum yakudeeum Sasa & Suzuki, 2000
- Polypedilum yamasinense (Tokunaga, 1940)
- Polypedilum yammounei Moubayed-Breil, 1992
- Polypedilum yanomami Bidawid & Fittkau, 1996
- Polypedilum yapense Tokunaga, 1964
- Polypedilum yaumounei Bidawid & Fittkau, 1995
- Polypedilum yavalapiti Bidawid & Fittkau, 1996
- Polypedilum ybytyra Shimabukuro & Trivinho-Strixino & Lamas, 2019
- Polypedilum yongsanense Ree, 1981
- Polypedilum yvatekaty Shimabukuro & Trivinho-Strixino & Lamas, 2019
- Polypedilum zavreli (Kieffer, 1922)
