= Desiccation tolerance =

Ability of an organism to withstand dryness

Desiccation tolerance refers to the ability of an organism to withstand or endure extreme dryness, or drought-like conditions. Plants and animals living in arid or periodically arid environments such as temporary streams or ponds may face the challenge of desiccation, therefore physiological or behavioral adaptations to withstand these periods are necessary to ensure survival. In particular, insects occupy a wide range of ecologically diverse niches and, so, exhibit a variety of strategies to avoid desiccation.

In general, desiccation resistance in insects is measured by the change in mass during dry conditions. The overall mass difference between measurements before and after aridity exposure is attributed to body water loss, as respiratory water loss is generally considered negligible.

== Desiccation and plants ==
Desiccation tolerant plants include Craterostigma plantagineum, Lindernia brevidens and Ramonda serbica.

Desiccation sensitive plants include members of Arabidopsis genus, Lindernia subracemosa, Gossypium hirsutum, Triticum aestivum and Zea mays.

== Types of desiccation resistance ==
There are three main ways in which insects can increase their tolerance to desiccation: by increasing their total body water content; by reducing the rate of body water loss; and by tolerating a larger proportion of overall water loss from the body. Survival time is determined by initial water content, and can be calculated by dividing water loss tolerance (the maximum amount of water that may be removed without resulting in death) by water loss rate.

=== Increasing body water content ===
Insects with a higher initial body water content have better survival rates during arid conditions than insects with a lower initial body water content. Higher amounts of internal body water lengthen the time necessary to remove the amount of water required to kill the organism. The way in which body water content is increased may differ depending on the species.

The accumulation of glycogen during the insect larval stage has been linked to increased body water content and is likely a source of metabolic water during dry conditions. Glycogen, a glucose polysaccharide, acts as an oxidative energy source during times of physiological stress. Because it binds up to five times its weight in bulk water, insects with increased levels of body glycogen also have higher amounts of internal water. In general, insects selected for desiccation resistance also exhibit longer larval stages than those sensitive to desiccation. This increase in development time is likely a response to the environment, allowing larvae more time to accumulate glycogen, and therefore more water before eclosion.

Another possible source contributing to higher levels of initial body water in insects is hemolymph volume. The insect equivalent to blood, hemolymph is the fluid found within the hemocoel, and is the largest pool of extracellular water within the insect body. In the fruit-fly Drosophila melanogaster, flies selected for desiccation resistance also yielded higher amounts of hemolymph. Higher hemolymph volume is linked to an increase in carbohydrates, in particular trehalose, a common sugar found in many plants and animals with high desiccation resistance. Drosophila melanogaster flies selected for desiccation resistance show a 300% increase in hemolymph volume compared to control flies, correlating to a similar increase in trehalose levels. During periods of aridity, cells dehydrate and draw upon hemolymph stores to replenish intracellular water; therefore, insects with higher levels of this fluid are less prone to desiccation.

Insects may also increase body water content by simply feeding more often. Because sugar is slowly absorbed into the hemolymph at each meal, increasing the frequency at which the insect ingests a sugar source also increases its desiccation tolerance. Furthermore, the crop may also act not only to store food prior to digestion but to provide an additional reservoir for water and sugar.

=== Reducing rate of water loss ===
Another strategy used to reduce the risk of death by dehydration is to reduce the rate at which water is lost. The three main ways through which insects can lose water are (1) the surface of the body (integument); (2) the tracheae (respiration); and (3) excretion, or waste products. The important feature in reducing water loss in land snails during inactivity is an epiphragm.

==== Integument ====
The exoskeleton or integument of insects acts as an impermeable, protective layer against desiccation. It is composed of an outer epicuticle, underlain by a procuticle that itself may be further divided into an exo- and endocuticle. The endocuticle provides the insect with toughness and flexibility and the hard exocuticle serves to protect vulnerable body parts. However, the outer cuticular layer (epicuticle) is a protein-polyphenol complex made up of lipoproteins, fatty acids, and waxy molecules, and is the insect's primary defense against water loss. Many insect orders secrete an additional cement layer over their wax layer, likely to protect against the abrasion or removal of waxy molecules. This layer is composed of lipids and proteins held together by polyphenolic compounds and is secreted by the dermal glands.

In general, the rate of water loss in insects is low at moderate temperatures. Once a species-specific critical temperature (Tc) is reached, as temperatures continue to increase, rapid water loss occurs. The “lipid melting model” is used to explain this sudden increase in the rate of water loss. The lipid melting model states that increased cuticular water loss is directly related to the melting of surface lipids. Insects already adapted to more arid environments have a higher Tc; that is, their cuticular properties change and lipid structures melt at a higher critical temperature.

In some insects, the rate of cuticular water loss is controlled to some extent by the neuroendocrine system. Immediately following head removal, decapitated cockroaches exhibit a large increase in transpiration across the cuticle, leading to severe dehydration. Injection of brain hormones into freshly separated bodies results in a sharp reduction in cuticular water loss.

==== Tracheae ====
In general, insects adapted to arid environments also have an impermeable cuticular membrane that prevents water loss. Therefore, a majority of water lost to the atmosphere occurs via the air-filled tracheae. To help reduce water loss, many insects have outer coverings to their tracheae, or spiracles, which shut when open respiration is unnecessary and prevent water from escaping. Insects at a greater risk for water loss face the challenge of either a depleted oxygen supply or desiccation, leading to an adaptive increase in tracheal volume in order to receive more oxygen.

==== Excretion ====
Following feeding, most insects retain enough water to completely hydrate their bodies, excreting the remainder. However, the amount of water excreted differs between species, and depends on the relative humidity and dryness of the environment. For example, Tsetse flies maintained at a high relative humidity, and thus non-arid conditions, excrete fecal matter with approximately 75% water content, whereas Tsetse flies maintained at a low relative humidity, and thus dry conditions, excrete fecal matter with only 35% water content. This adaptation helps minimize water loss in unfavorable conditions and increase chances of survival.

=== Tolerating greater water loss ===
Most insects can tolerate a 30-50% loss of body water; however, insects adapted to dry environments can tolerate a 40-60% loss of body water. Initial body size also plays a large role in how much water loss can be tolerated, and, in general, larger insects can tolerate a larger percentage of body water loss than smaller insects. The female beetle Alphitobius diaperinus, for example, is larger than its male counterpart and can thus tolerate 4% more water loss. It is hypothesized that larger insects have increased lipid reserves, preventing dehydration and desiccation.

== Behavior modification ==
In addition to physiological adaptations that increase desiccation resistance, behavioral responses of insects to arid environments significantly decrease dehydration potential. Drosophila melanogaster fruit flies, for example, will actively move to areas with higher atmospheric water content when placed in dry environments. Also, the dung beetle buries food in underground chambers, thereby ensuring water and energy sources during periodically dry conditions. Feeding location may also be altered to ensure body hydration. Some caterpillars preferentially feed on the underside of leaves, where microclimate has higher relative humidity. In a highly time-consuming activity such as feeding, these insects significantly reduce their chances of desiccation.

== Cryptobiosis (Anhydrobiosis) ==
Cryptobiosis refers to the state of an organism that has no detectable metabolic activity, resulting from extreme and unfavorable environmental conditions; anhydrobiosis refers to the state of surviving the loss of (almost) all body water. Although this state is commonly observed in invertebrates, only one insect is known to be cryptobiotic (anhydrobiotic), the African chironomid Polypedilum vanderplanki. Polypedilum vanderplanki undergoes anhydrobiosis, a cryptobiotic state wherein the body is completely dehydrated. The larvae of P. vanderplanki inhabit rock pools that commonly dry out completely. In response, P. vanderplanki larvae enter an anhydrobiotic state, during which changes in body osmolarity trigger the production of large amounts of trehalose. Due to its capacity for water replacement and vitrification, the accumulation of trehalose prevents the death of the larvae from water loss.
