= Cryptobiosis =

Metabolic state of life

When dried, terrestrial tardigrades draw in their legs and go into a cryptobiotic 'tun' state. They revive quickly when re-wetted.

Cryptobiosis or anabiosis is a metabolic state in extremophilic organisms in response to adverse environmental conditions such as desiccation, freezing, and oxygen deficiency. In the cryptobiotic state, all measurable metabolic processes stop, preventing reproduction, development, and repair. When environmental conditions return to being hospitable, the organism will return to its metabolic state of life as it was prior to cryptobiosis.

== Forms ==
=== Anhydrobiosis ===
Anhydrobiosis in the tardigrade Richtersius coronifer

Anhydrobiosis is the most studied form of cryptobiosis and occurs in situations of extreme desiccation. The term anhydrobiosis derives from the Greek for "life without water" and is most commonly used for the desiccation tolerance observed in certain invertebrate animals such as bdelloid rotifers, tardigrades, brine shrimp, nematodes, and at least one insect, a species of chironomid (Polypedilum vanderplanki). However, other life forms exhibit desiccation tolerance. These include the resurrection plant Craterostigma plantagineum, the majority of plant seeds, and many microorganisms such as bakers' yeast. Some anhydrobiotic organisms can survive for decades, even centuries, in the dry state.

Invertebrates undergoing anhydrobiosis often contract into a smaller shape and some proceed to form a sugar called trehalose, a disaccharide consisting of two molecules of glucose with high water retention capabilities. Desiccation tolerance in plants is associated with the production of another sugar, sucrose. These sugars are thought to protect the organism from desiccation damage. In some creatures, such as bdelloid rotifers, no trehalose has been found, which has led scientists to propose other mechanisms of anhydrobiosis, possibly involving intrinsically disordered proteins.

In 2011, Caenorhabditis elegans, a nematode that is also one of the best-studied model organisms, was shown to undergo anhydrobiosis in the dauer larva stage. In addition to trehalose biosynthesis, a set of other functional pathways is involved in anhydrobiosis at the molecular level. These are mainly defense mechanisms against reactive oxygen species and xenobiotics, expression of heat shock proteins and intrinsically disordered proteins as well as biosynthesis of polyunsaturated fatty acids and polyamines. Some of them are conserved among anhydrobiotic plants and animals, suggesting that anhydrobiotic ability may depend on a set of common mechanisms. Understanding these mechanisms in detail might enable modification of non-anhydrobiotic cells, tissues, organs or even organisms so that they can be preserved in a dried state of suspended animation over long time periods.

=== Anoxybiosis ===
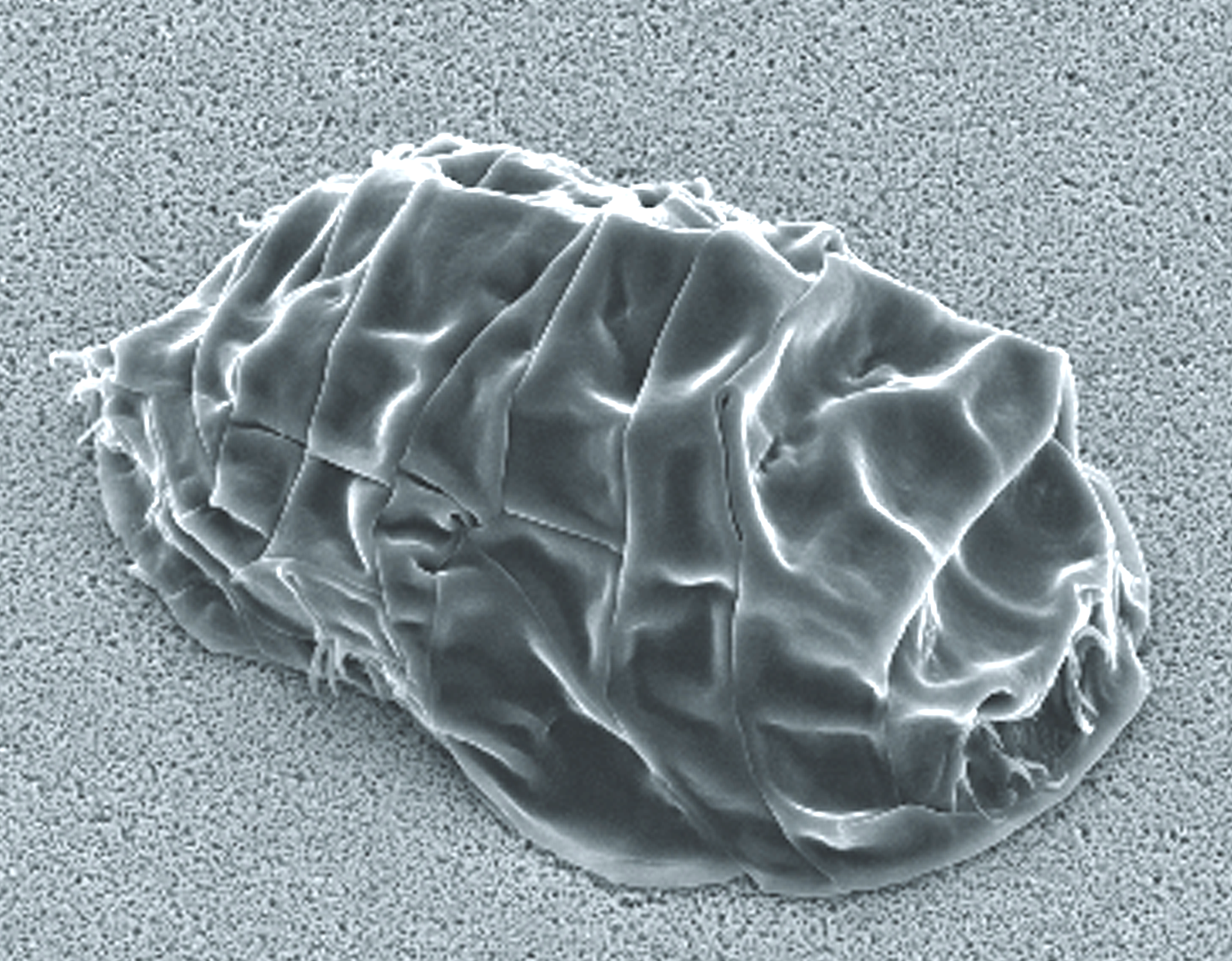
SEM image of Milnesium tardigradum in tun (suspended) state

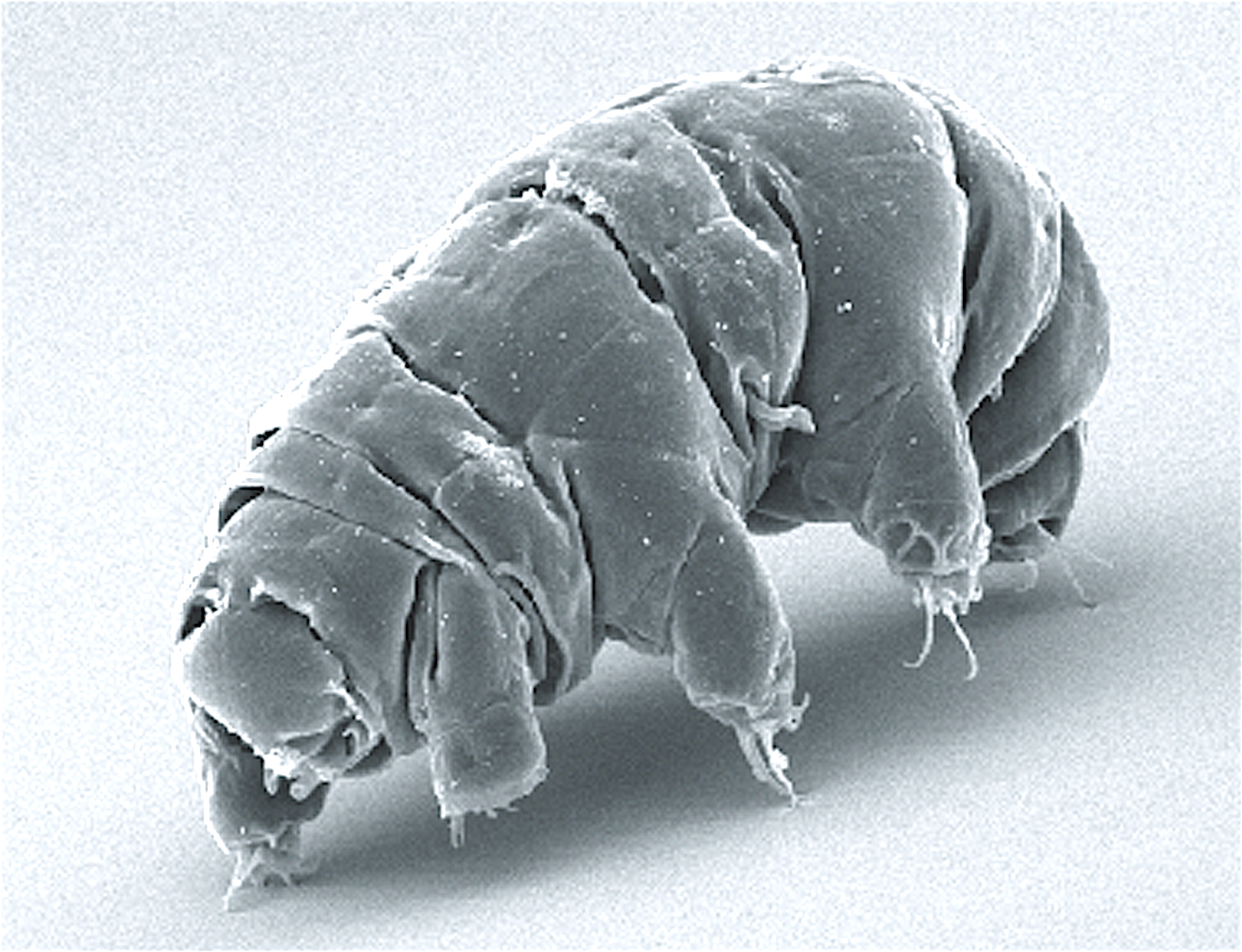
SEM image of Milnesium tardigradum in active state

In situations lacking oxygen (a.k.a., anoxia), many cryptobionts (such as M. tardigradum) take in water and become turgid and immobile, but can survive for prolonged periods of time. Some ectothermic vertebrates and some invertebrates, such as brine shrimps, copepods, nematodes, and sponge gemmules, are capable of surviving in a seemingly inactive state during anoxic conditions for months to decades.

Studies of the metabolic activity of these idling organisms during anoxia have been mostly inconclusive. This is because it is difficult to measure very small degrees of metabolic activity reliably enough to prove a cryptobiotic state rather than ordinary metabolic rate depression (MRD). Many experts are skeptical of the biological feasibility of anoxybiosis, as the organism is managing to prevent damage to its cellular structures from the environmental negative free energy, despite being both surrounded by plenty of water and thermal energy and without using any free energy of its own. However, there is evidence that the stress-induced protein p26 may act as a protein chaperone that requires no energy in cystic Artemia franciscana (sea monkey) embryos, and most likely an extremely specialized and slow guanine polynucleotide pathway continues to provide metabolic free energy to the A. franciscana embryos during anoxic conditions. It seems that A. franciscana approaches but does not reach true anoxybiosis.

=== Chemobiosis ===
Chemobiosis is the cryptobiotic response to high levels of environmental toxins. It has been observed in tardigrades.

=== Cryobiosis ===
Cryobiosis is a form of cryptobiosis that takes place in reaction to decreased temperature. Cryobiosis begins when the water surrounding the organism's cells has been frozen. Stopping molecule mobility allows the organism to endure the freezing temperatures until more hospitable conditions return. Organisms capable of enduring these conditions typically feature molecules that facilitate freezing of water in preferential locations while also prohibiting the growth of large ice crystals that could otherwise damage cells. Examples of such organisms include lobster and nematodes.

=== Osmobiosis ===
Osmobiosis is the least studied of all types of cryptobiosis. Osmobiosis occurs in response to increased solute concentration in the solution the organism lives in. Little is known for certain, other than that osmobiosis appears to involve a cessation of metabolism.

== Taxonomic range ==
The brine shrimp Artemia salina, which can be found in the Makgadikgadi Pans in Botswana, survives over the dry season when the water of the pans evaporates, leaving a virtually desiccated lake bed. A related species, Artemia fransiscana, can undergo anhydrobiosis as eggs. These are packaged and sold as sea monkeys to be rehydrated and kept as pets.

Tardigrades can undergo all five types of cryptobiosis. While in a cryptobiotic state, their metabolism reduces to less than 0.01% of what is normal, and their water content can drop to 1% of normal. It can withstand extreme temperature, radiation, and pressure while in a cryptobiotic state.

Some nematodes and rotifers can undergo cryptobiosis.

== Biomimetic strategy for scientific use ==
Lyopreservation has been developed as a technique for preservation of biological samples at ambient temperatures. Lyopreservation is a biomimetic strategy based on anhydrobiosis to preserve cells at ambient temperatures. It has been explored as an alternative technique for cryopreservation. The technique has the advantages of being able to preserve biological samples at ambient temperatures, without the need for refrigeration or use of cryogenic temperatures.

== See also ==
- Biostasis – Coping with environmental changes without adapting
- Cryobiology – Study of effects of extreme low temperatures on life
- Cryonics – Freezing of a corpse with the intent of future revival
- Cryptobiotic soil – Communities of living organisms on the soil surface in arid and semi-arid ecosystems
- Hibernation – Physiological state of dormant inactivity in order to pass the winter season
- Lyopreservation – Metabolic state of life
