= Polypedilum braseniae =

Scientific classification
- Domain: Eukaryota
- Kingdom: Animalia
- Phylum: Arthropoda
- Class: Insecta
- Order: Diptera
- Family: Chironomidae
- Tribe: Chironomini
- Genus: Polypedilum
- Species: P. braseniae

Binomial name
- Polypedilum braseniae (Leathers, 1922)

Synonyms
- Chironomus braseniae Leathers, 1922

Species of fly

Polypedilum braseniae is a species of midge in the family Chironomidae.
