= Polypedilum tritum =

Scientific classification
- Kingdom: Animalia
- Phylum: Arthropoda
- Class: Insecta
- Order: Diptera
- Family: Chironomidae
- Tribe: Chironomini
- Genus: Polypedilum
- Species: P. tritum

Binomial name
- Polypedilum tritum (Walker, 1856)

Synonyms
- Chironomus tritum Walker, 1856

Species of fly

Polypedilum tritum is a species of midge in the family Chironomidae. It is found in Europe.
