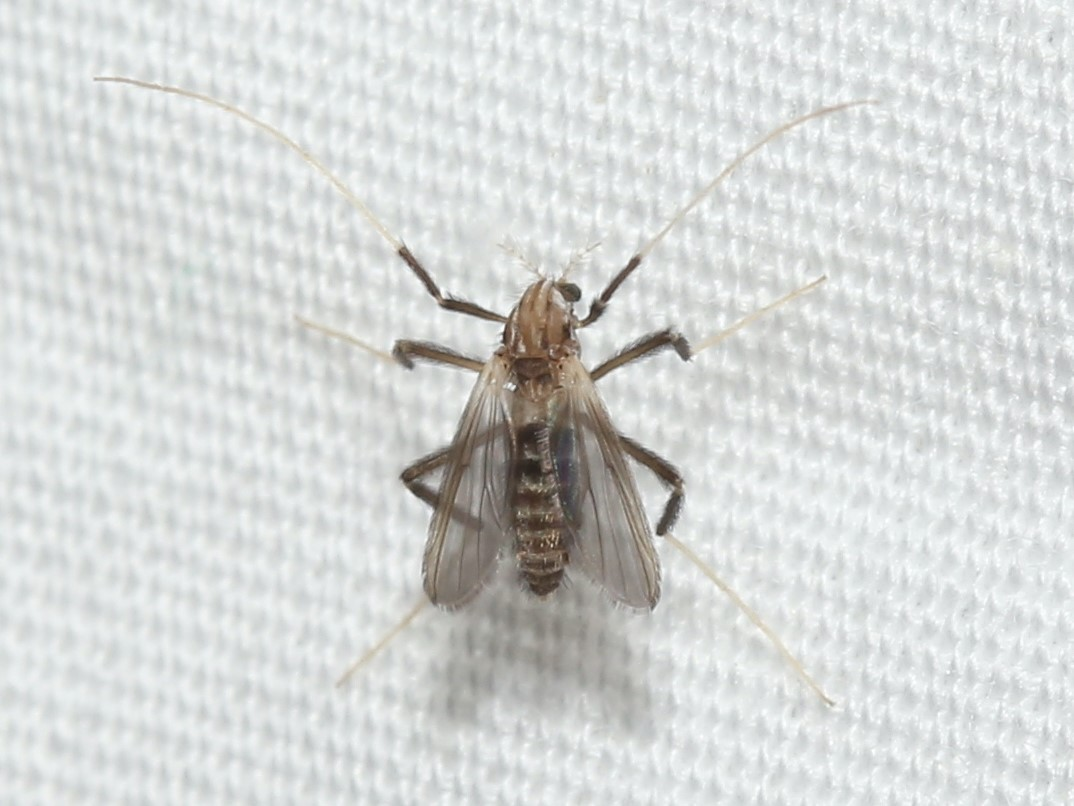

Scientific classification
- Kingdom: Animalia
- Phylum: Arthropoda
- Class: Insecta
- Order: Diptera
- Family: Chironomidae
- Tribe: Chironomini
- Genus: Polypedilum
- Species: P. ontario

Binomial name
- Polypedilum ontario (Walley, 1926)

Synonyms
- Chironomus hirtipes Mitchell, 1908; Chironomus ontario Walley, 1926

= Polypedilum ontario =

Species of fly

Polypedilum ontario is a species of midge in the family Chironomidae.
