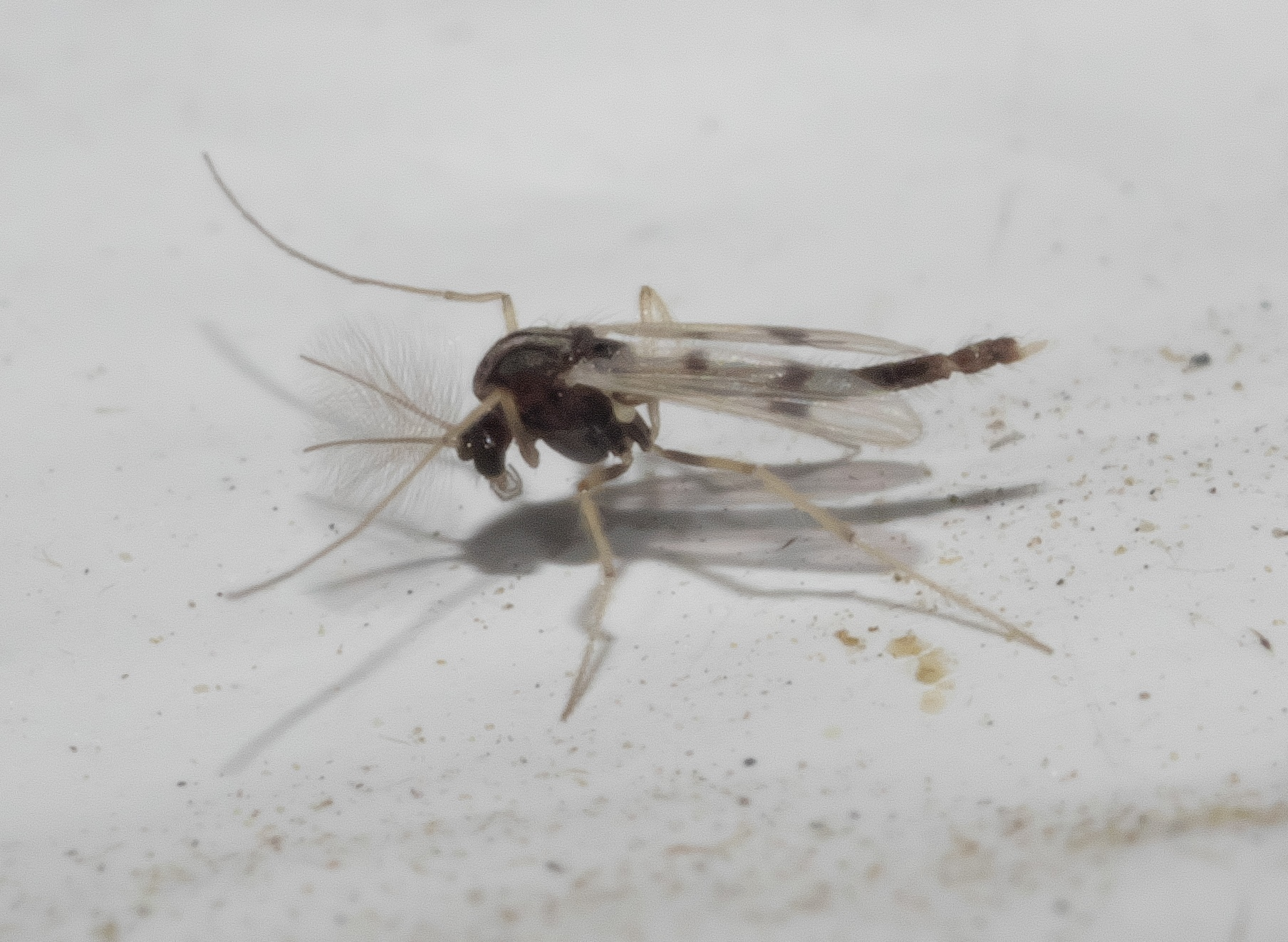
- Polypedilum scalaenum, Oklahoma

Scientific classification
- Kingdom: Animalia
- Phylum: Arthropoda
- Clade: Pancrustacea
- Class: Insecta
- Order: Diptera
- Family: Chironomidae
- Subfamily: Chironominae
- Tribe: Chironomini
- Genus: Polypedilum
- Species: P. scalaenum

Binomial name
- Polypedilum scalaenum (Schrank, 1803)

Synonyms
- Chironomus needhamii Johannsen, 1908; Chironomus scalaenus Schrank, Edwards, 1929; Chironomus trinotatus Wulp, 1875; Polypedilum breviantennatum Chernovsky, 1949; Polypedilum conjunctum Kieffer, 1920; Polypedilum trinotatum (Van der Wulp, 1874); Tipula scalaena Schrank, 1803

= Polypedilum scalaenum =

Species of non-biting midges

Polypedilum scalaenum is a species of non-biting midge in the family Chironomidae, found in North America and Europe.
