= Polypedilum sordens =

Scientific classification
- Domain: Eukaryota
- Kingdom: Animalia
- Phylum: Arthropoda
- Class: Insecta
- Order: Diptera
- Family: Chironomidae
- Genus: Polypedilum
- Species: P. sordens

Binomial name
- Polypedilum sordens (Wulp, 1874)

Synonyms
- Calopsectra americana Kieffer, 1917; Tanytarsus fulvescens Johannsen, 1905; Tanytarsus sordens Wulp, 1874

Species of fly

Polypedilum sordens is a species of midge in the family Chironomidae.
