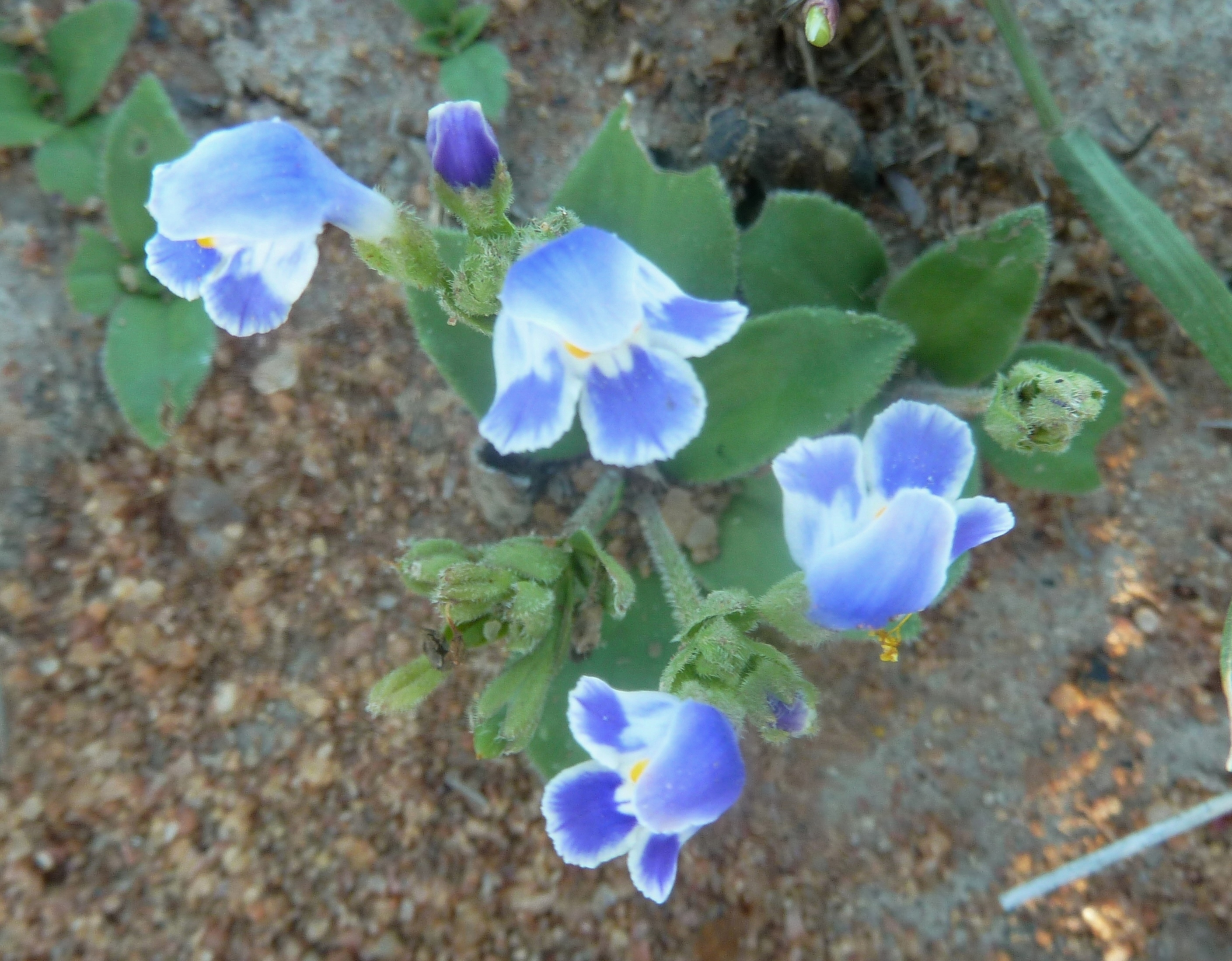
- Craterostigma plantagineum

Scientific classification
- Kingdom: Plantae
- Clade: Tracheophytes
- Clade: Angiosperms
- Clade: Eudicots
- Clade: Asterids
- Order: Lamiales
- Family: Linderniaceae
- Genus: Craterostigma; Hochst.

Species
- See text

Synonyms
- Dunalia R.Br.; Mitranthus Hochst.; Strigina Engl.

= Craterostigma =

Genus of Linderniaceae plants

Craterostigma is a genus of shrub-like flowering plants in the family Linderniaceae, found in Africa, Madagascar, (island of) Socotra, the Arabian Peninsula, the Indian Subcontinent, Sri Lanka, China, Southeast Asia and Java. The best studied species is the resurrection plant Craterostigma plantagineum, known for its unique drought tolerance.

The word 'craterostigma' comes from two Greek words, krateros meaning cup-shaped and stigma, part of the female reproductive part of a flower.

== Species ==
Currently accepted species include:

- Craterostigma abyssinicum (Engl.) Eb.Fisch., Schäferh. & Kai Müll.
- Craterostigma alatum Hepper
- Craterostigma angolense (Skan) Eb.Fisch., Schäferh. & Kai Müll.
- Craterostigma engleri Eb.Fisch., Schäferh. & Kai Müll.
- Craterostigma gossweileri (S.Moore) Eb.Fisch., Schäferh. & Kai Müll.
- Craterostigma hirsutum S.Moore
- Craterostigma kigomense (Eb.Fisch.) Eb.Fisch., Schäferh. & Kai Müll.
- Craterostigma lanceolatum (Engl.) Skan
- Craterostigma lindernioides E.A.Bruce
- Craterostigma loitense I.Darbysh. & Eb.Fisch.
- Craterostigma longicarpum Hepper
- Craterostigma newtonii (Engl.) Eb.Fisch., Schäferh. & Kai Müll.
- Craterostigma niamniamense (Eb.Fisch. & Hepper) Eb.Fisch., Schäferh. & Kai Müll.
- Craterostigma nummulariifolium (D.Don) Eb.Fisch., Schäferh. & Kai Müll.
- Craterostigma plantagineum Hochst.
- Craterostigma pumilum Hochst.
- Craterostigma purpureum Lebrun & L.Touss.
- Craterostigma pusillum (Engl.) Eb.Fisch., Schäferh. & Kai Müll.
- Craterostigma sessiliflorum (Benth.) Y.S.Liang & J.C.Wang
- Craterostigma smithii S.Moore
- Craterostigma stuhlmannii (Engl.) Eb.Fisch., Schäferh. & Kai Müll.
- Craterostigma sudanicum (Eb.Fisch. & Hepper) Eb.Fisch., Schäferh. & Kai Müll.
- Craterostigma syncerus (Seine, Eb.Fisch. & Barthlott) Eb.Fisch., Schäferh. & Kai Müll.
- Craterostigma tanzanicum Eb.Fisch., Schäferh. & Kai Müll.
- Craterostigma wilmsii Engl.
- Craterostigma yaundense (S.Moore) Eb.Fisch., Schäferh. & Kai Müll.

== Other sources ==
- Fischer, E. et al. 2013. The phylogeny of Linderniaceae - The new genus Linderniella, and new combinations within Bonnaya, Craterostigma, Lindernia, Micranthemum, Torenia and Vandellia. (Willdenowia) 43:221-223.
