= Polypedilum vanderplanki =

Scientific classification
- Kingdom: Animalia
- Phylum: Arthropoda
- Class: Insecta
- Order: Diptera
- Family: Chironomidae
- Genus: Polypedilum
- Species: P. vanderplanki

Binomial name
- Polypedilum vanderplanki Hinton, 1951

Species of fly

Polypedilum vanderplanki or the sleeping chironomid, is a dipteran in the family Chironomidae (non-biting midges). It occurs in the semi-arid regions of the African continent (e.g. northern Nigeria and Uganda). Its larvae are found in small tubular nests in the mud at the bottom of temporary pools that frequently dry out during the lifetime of P. vanderplanki larvae. Under these conditions, the larvae's body desiccates to as low as 3% water content by weight. In the dehydrated state the larvae become impervious to many extreme environmental conditions, and can survive temperatures from 3 K to up to 375 K, very high (7000 gray) levels of gamma-rays, and exposure to vacuum. It is one of few metazoans that can withstand near complete desiccation (anhydrobiosis) in order to survive adverse environmental conditions. Slow desiccation (0.22 ml per day) enabled larvae to synthesize 38 μg trehalose/individual, and all of them recovered after rehydration, whereas larvae that were dehydrated 3 times faster accumulated only 6.8 μg trehalose/individual and none of them revived after rehydration. Late Embryo Abundant (LEA), anti-oxidant, and heat-shock proteins may also be involved in survival. This species is considered the most cold-tolerant insect species, able to survive liquid helium (−270 °C) exposure for up to 5 min. with a 100% survival rate when desiccated to 8% water content.
