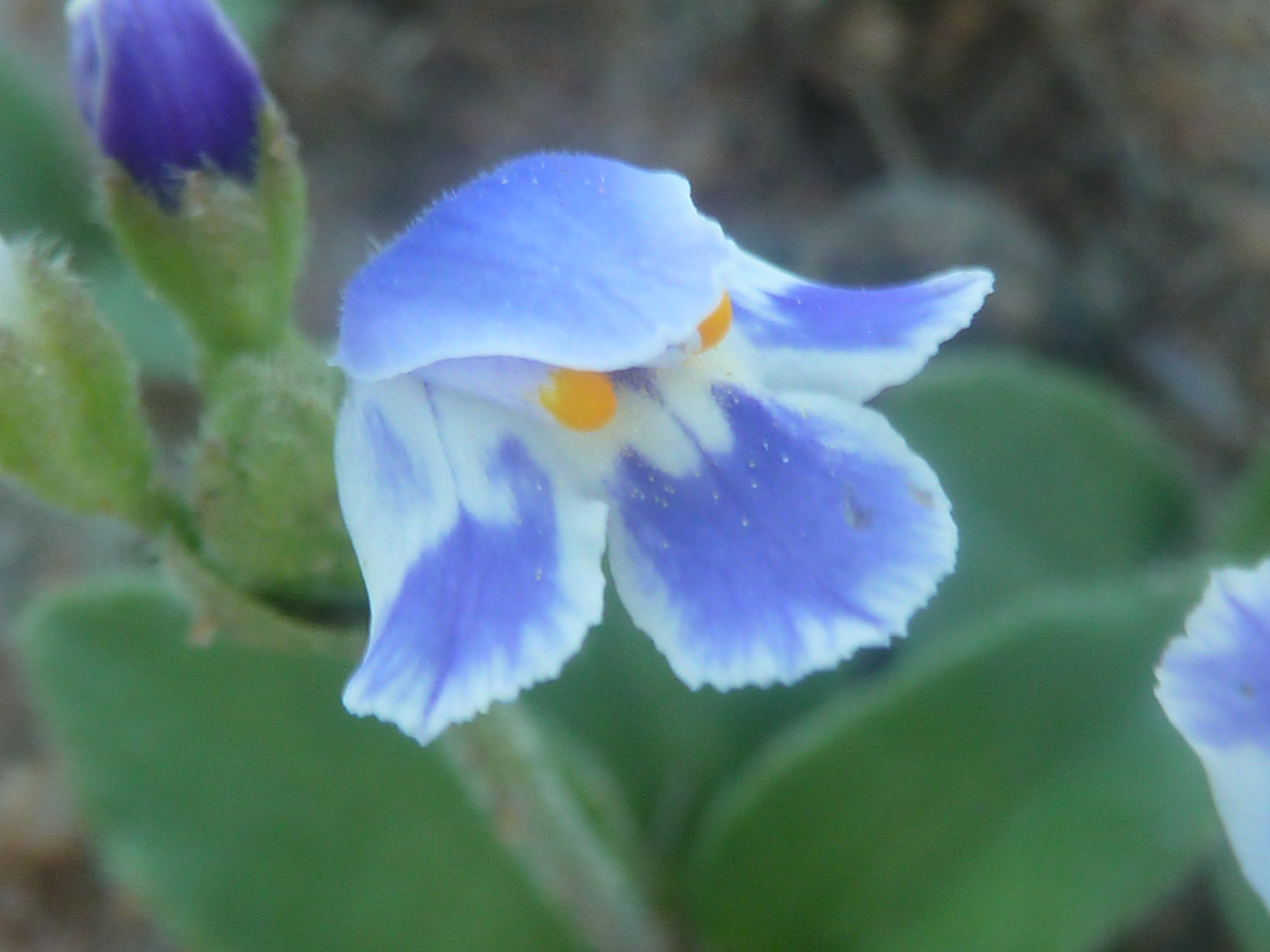

Scientific classification
- Kingdom: Plantae
- Clade: Tracheophytes
- Clade: Angiosperms
- Clade: Eudicots
- Clade: Asterids
- Order: Lamiales
- Family: Linderniaceae
- Genus: Craterostigma
- Species: C. plantagineum

Binomial name
- Craterostigma plantagineum Hochst.

Synonyms
- Craterostigma nanum (Benth.) Engl. Torenia plantaginea (Hochst.) Benth.

= Craterostigma plantagineum =

Species of flowering plant

Craterostigma plantagineum, is a resurrection plant species in the genus Craterostigma. It is a dwarf growing plant and can be found (in ideal conditions) to make a 'carpet' across the ground, with blooms in shades of blue and purple. It is a well-studied desiccation-tolerant species known for its extreme vegetative tolerance against dehydration and desiccation. It is native to parts of Africa and to India. It is known as a resurrection plant (meaning it can dry out and stay dormant for long periods and then come back to life after some rain).

== Description ==
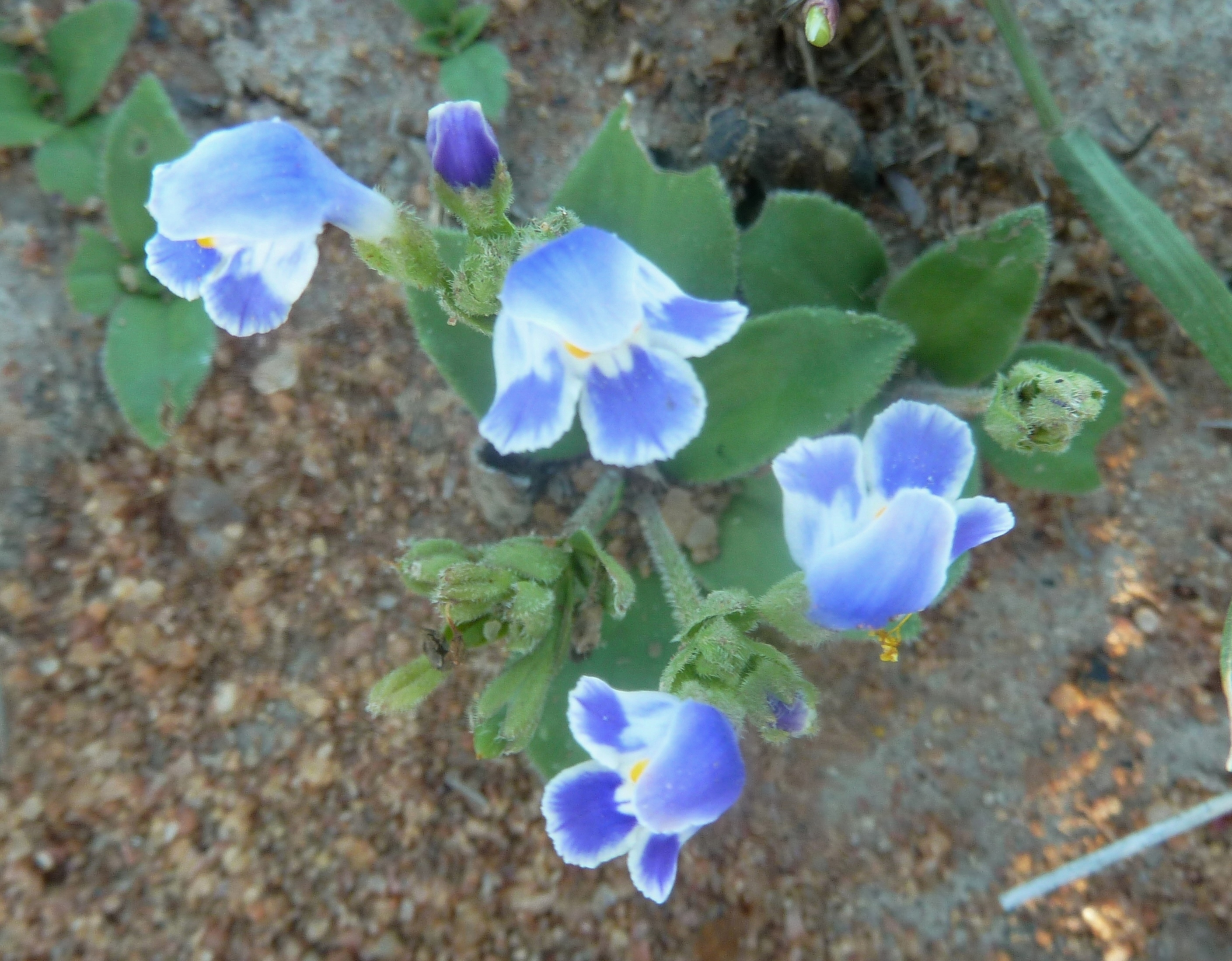
Seen in Borakalalo Game Reserve, North West Province, South Africa

Craterostigma plantagineum has an orange-red to yellow rhizome with hairy roots underneath.

It has a rosette of leaves, which are variable, ranging from narrow elliptic, lanceolate, to broadly ovate. The leaf is approx. 50mm in diameter. They can be lightly hairy on both surfaces, or hairless above and hairy beneath. They conspicuously veined, or ribbed. The veins or ribs are purple or pink on the underside.

Above the leaf, it has a small branched or unbranched stem, which is hairy, and usually less than 2–3 in (51–76 mm) tall. It is quadrangular in section.

In summer it blooms, normally between October and May, appearing a week after the first rains.

The blooms appear at the end of the branched stems are the flowers, which are 0.3–1.0 cm (0–0 in) tall or long. They are blue, or purple. with a white throat. 5 broad lobes, with 2 yellow, or orange honey guides, marked as spots at the throat, acting as false stamens. The true stamens are united under the hood, where the two lobed stigma waits.

After the flowers are finished blooming, it produces a fruit capsule which is ovoid, cylindric and glabrous or smooth.

=== Biochemistry ===
Most plants have two sets of chromosomes, this can be used to identify hybrids and aid in classification of groupings. It is polyploid, and has a chromosome count of 2n=56.

=== Resurrection plant ===
Craterostigma plantagineum (Hochst) is known as a resurrection plant as it has the ability to dry out and then stay dormant for long periods and then come back to life after some rain. It re-hydrates rapidly on re-watering. These survival mechanisms help it cope in environments with extreme hydration and restricted seasonal water.

As well as being able to cope with water scarcity, it is also resistant to salinity.

It is desiccation tolerant, and in 2001, a study was carried out by D. Bartels and F. Salamini, to understand the drought tolerance at a molecular level (Plant Physiology, 127:1346-53). Other studies on the plant include effects of desiccation on photosynthesis pigments (J. Alamillo and D. Bartels, 2001, Plant Sci 160, 1161–1170) and polyamine metabolic canalization of drought stress (R. Alcazar, M. Bitrian, D. Bartels et al. 2011, Plant Sig. Behav. 6:243-250).

It was found in 2000, that the capacity to accumulate large amounts of sucrose in the vegetative tissues helps the plant survive.

In 2011, a study found that Putrescine (an organic chemical compound) to spermine (an organic chemical compound) canalization has also been found in C. plantagineum, which conversely to Arabidopsis, accumulates high spermine levels which associate with drought tolerance.

== Taxonomy ==
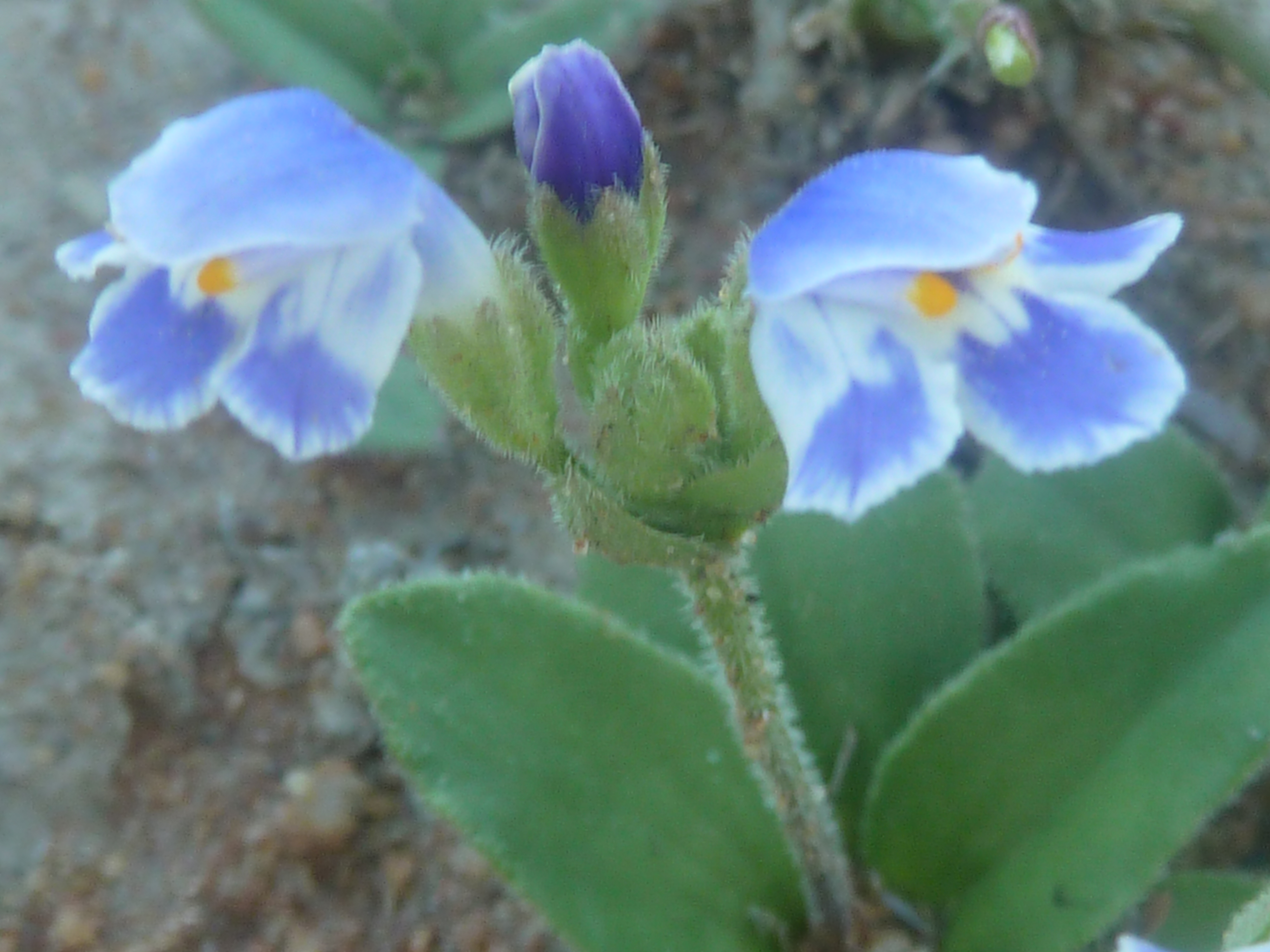
Seen in Borakalalo Game Reserve, South Africa

It was once the English common name of Rhodesian Violet; recently it has been called the Kenya violet. It is also called 'blue carpet', or 'false violet', and occasionally as 'mole's spectacles'. but this last one is normally the common name for Craterostigma wilmsii or Craterostigma nanum. It is also commonly called the 'resurrection plant' in science.

In Zimbabwe, it has 2 common names, in Tonga language, it is known as 'mubatabata', and in Ndebele language it is 'umabuyasibonze'.

The Latin specific epithet plantagineum refers to the leaves of the plant which are similar to those of a plantain.

It was first described and published by German (botanist and Protestant minister) Christian Ferdinand Friedrich Hochstetter, in 'Flora' Vol.24 on page 669 in 1841.

The species and genus was described by Hochstetter also in 1841; the name 'Craterostigma', may refer to the hollow between the two lips of the stigma.

It was verified by United States Department of Agriculture and the Agricultural Research Service on 12 April 2016.

== Distribution and habitat ==
Craterostigma plantagineum is native to some tropical parts of Africa and Temperate Asia.

=== Range ===
It is found within Africa in Chad, Ethiopia, Somalia, Sudan (including Didinga mountains in south Sudan,), Kenya, Tanzania, Uganda, Burundi, Democratic Republic of the Congo, Rwanda, Niger, Angola, Zambia, Zimbabwe, Botswana, Namibia and South Africa. Within Asia, it is found in India and also on the Arabian peninsula in Yemen.

=== Habitat ===
It is found growing in shallow soils over rock, on the edge of murram (dirt roads), or on poor pasture lands, and in wooded grasslands.

It grows in lowlands, at altitudes of 900–2,200 m (3,000–7,200 ft) above sea level.

== Cultivation ==
It is used in gardens within East Africa.

== Uses ==
It has been medically used in folk medicine in Botswana, an infusion of the roots was taken for the treatment of abdominal pains. Also an ointment was applied to the face as a lucky charm.

== Other sources ==
- Chapano, C. & Mugarisanwa, N.H. (2003). Plants of the Matobo District National Herbarium and Botanic Garden, Zimbabwe Page 10.
- Fabian, A. & Germishuizen, G. (1997). Wild Flowers of Northern South Africa. Fernwood Press, Vlaeburg. Pages 366 - 367. (Includes a picture).
- Fischer, E. (1992). Systematik der afrikanischen Lindernieae (Scrophulariaceae) Tropische und subtropische Pflanzenwelt 81 Pages 87 – 94. (Includes a picture).
- Fischer, E. et al. 2013. The phylogeny of Linderniaceae - The new genus Linderniella, and new combinations within Bonnaya, Craterostigma, Lindernia, Micranthemum, Torenia and Vandellia. Willdenowia 43:221.
- Ghazanfar, S.A., Hepper, F.N. & Philcox, D. (2008). Scrophulariaceae Flora of Tropical East Africa Pages 61 – 62.
- Heath, A. & Heath, R. (2009). Field Guide to the Plants of Northern Botswana including the Okavango Delta Kew Publishing Page 58. (Includes a picture).
- Hepper, F.N. (1990). Craterostigma Flora Zambesiaca 8(2) Page 56.
- Hornby, H.E. & Hornby, R.M (1964). The reaction of Craterostigma plantagineum Hochst. to desiccation Kirkia 4 Pages 217 - 220. (Includes a picture).
- Kirby, G. (2013). Wild Flowers of Southeast Botswana Struik Nature, Cape Town South Africa Page 325. (Includes a picture).
- Mapaura, A. & Timberlake, J. (eds) (2004). A checklist of Zimbabwean vascular plants Southern African Botanical Diversity Network Report No. 33 Sabonet, Pretoria and Harare Page 77.
- Philcox, D. (1990). Scrophulariaceae Flora Zambesiaca 8(2) Page 56.
- Phiri, P.S.M. (2005). A Checklist of Zambian Vascular Plants Southern African Botanical Diversity Network Report No. 32 Page 97.
- Pickering, H. & Roe, E. (2009). Wild Flowers of the Victoria Falls Area Helen Pickering, London Page 106. (Includes a picture).
- Plowes, D.C.H. & Drummond, R.B. (1990). Wild Flowers of Zimbabwe. Revised edition. Longman, Zimbabwe. No. 109, plate 147
- Setshogo, M.P. (2005). Preliminary checklist of the plants of Botswana. Sabonet Report no. 37. Sabonet, Pretoria and Gaborone Page 103.
- Dorothea Bartels, Desiccation Tolerance Studied in the Resurrection Plant Craterostigma plantagineum, Integrative and Comparative Biology, Volume 45, Issue 5, November 2005, Pages 696–701, https://doi.org/10.1093/icb/45.5.696
