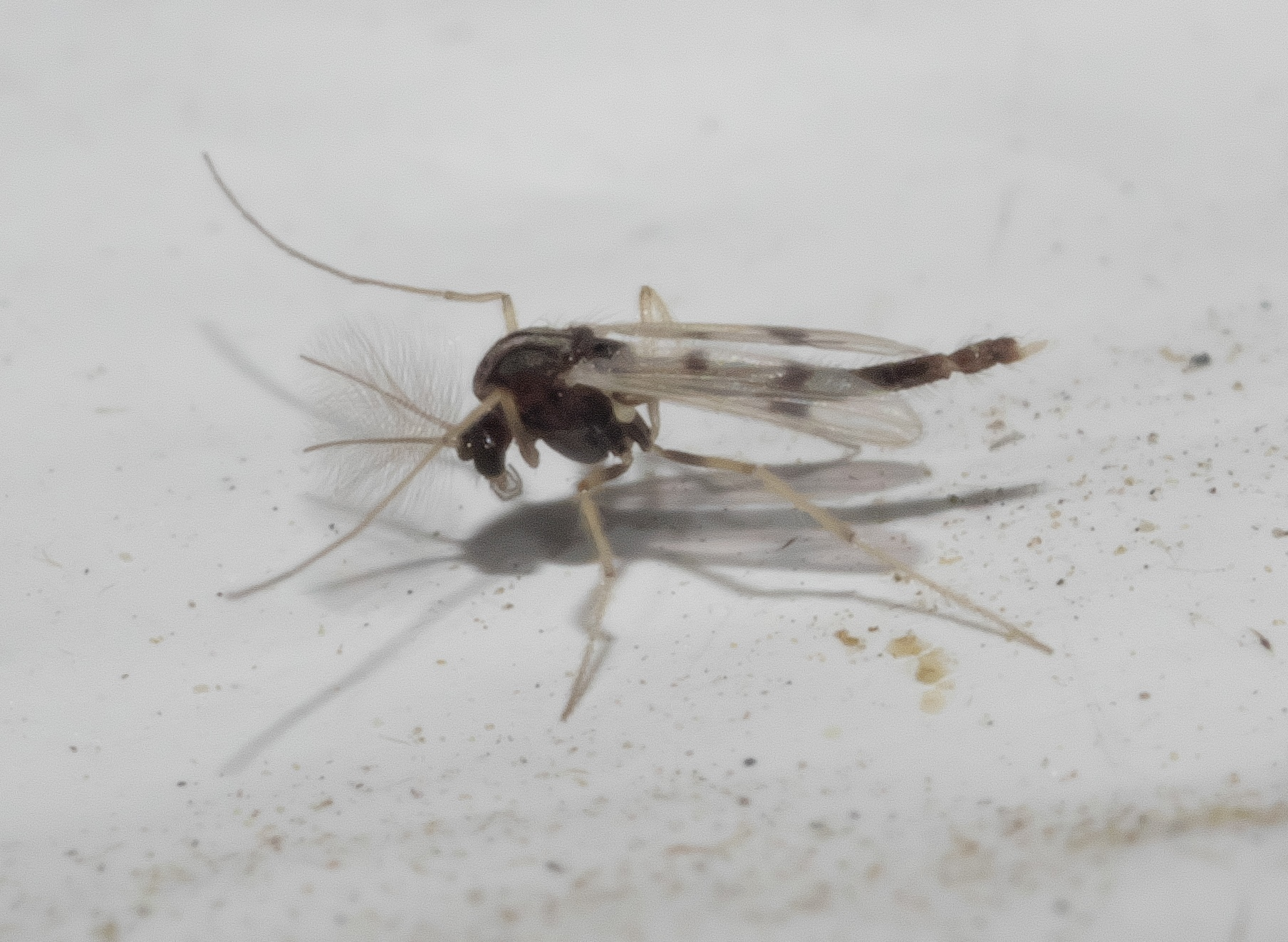
- Polypedilum scalaenum, Oklahoma

Scientific classification
- Kingdom: Animalia
- Phylum: Arthropoda
- Clade: Pancrustacea
- Class: Insecta
- Order: Diptera
- Family: Chironomidae
- Subfamily: Chironominae
- Tribe: Chironomini
- Genus: Polypedilum; Kieffer, 1912

Subgenera
- Asheum Sublette & Sublette, 1983; Atopipedilum Yamamoto, Yamamoto & Hirowatari, 2016; Collartomyia Goetghebuer, 1948; Pentapedilum Kieffer, 1913; Polypedilum Kieffer, 1912; Probolum Andersen & Saether, 2010; Tripedilum; Tripodura Townes, 1945; Uresipedilum Oyewo & Saether, 1998

Diversity
- at least 620 species

Synonyms
- Atopipedilum Yamamoto, Yamamoto & Hirowatari, 2016; Cerobregma Sæther & Sundal, 1999; Kribiocharis Kieffer, 1921; Kribionympha Kieffer, 1921; Kribiophilus Kieffer, 1921; Kribiotima Kieffer, 1921; Pentapelma Kieffer, 1921; Propedilum Lenz, 1937; Rosenia Kieffer, 1921; Tripedilum Kieffer, 1921; Tripodura Townes, 1945; Uresipedilum Oyewo & Sæther, 1998

= Polypedilum =

Genus of non-biting midges

Polypedilum is a genus of non-biting midges in the family Chironomidae. There are more than 620 described species in Polypedilum, found worldwide.

This is probably the most species-rich of all chironomid genera. Larvae of Polypedilum may also be among the most abundant invertebrates in eutrophic ponds, reaching densities of up to 1200 larvae per square meter.

== See also ==
- List of Polypedilum species
