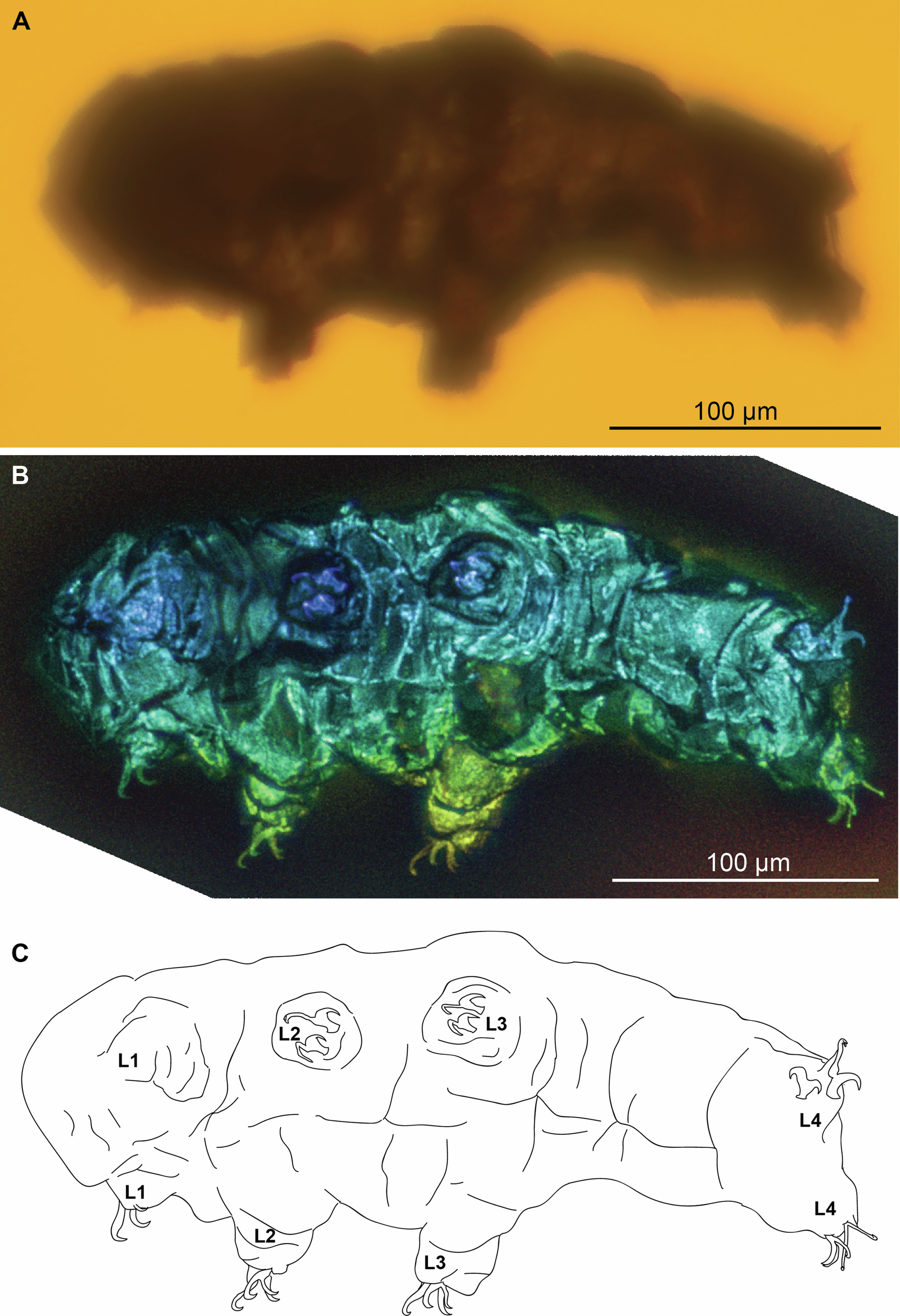
- Holotype specimen under various imaging techniques

Scientific classification
- Kingdom: Animalia
- Phylum: Tardigrada
- Class: Eutardigrada
- Order: Parachela
- Family: Hypsibiidae
- Genus: †Beorn; Cooper, 1964
- Species: †B. leggi

Binomial name
- †Beorn leggi Cooper, 1964

= Beorn (tardigrade) =

Beorn Temporal range: Late Cretaceous, Campanian

Extinct genus of tardigrades

Beorn is an extinct genus of tardigrade and the first known fossil tardigrade, discovered in Late Cretaceous amber from Manitoba, Canada. The genus contains a single species, B. leggi, and it was originally classified as the only member of its family, the Beornidae, but was later reclassified as belonging to the Hypsibiidae.

It is one of three fossil tardigrades known from the Cretaceous, the others being Milnesium swolenskyi from the Turonian New Jersey amber and Aerobius from the same amber piece as Beorn. The only other confidently known fossil tardigrade is the Miocene Paradoryphoribius from the Dominican Republic.

In addition to some other finds from the Cretaceous and the Cambrian period, Beorn is an example of the early existence of tardigrades in earth's history, and its largely modern appearance suggests that tardigrades must have diversified considerably before this time.

== Discovery and naming ==
William M. Legg collected the amber in the summer of 1940 in which the holotypes of both Beorn and Aerobius were found. He died in 1953 before finishing his thesis at Princeton University.

Kenneth W. Cooper, Legg's friend and scientific mentor, named Beorn leggi after him in 1964. The type specimen is now in the Museum of Comparative Zoology at Harvard University.

== Etymology ==
The generic name Beorn was chosen by Cooper in reference to a character of the same name from the children's book The Hobbit by J. R. R. Tolkien, which can occur both in the shape of a man and that of a bear. The specific name leggi refers to Cooper's student William Legg.

== Characteristics ==
The holotype is enclosed in honey-colored amber. The animal itself is 0.3 millimeters long and 0.08 millimeters wide. As is the case with modern tardigrades, the cylindrical body is flattened on the ventral side.

The cuticle is smooth, and slightly thickened on the backside, but does not harden to platelets (sclerites), making Beorn is one of the "naked" tardigrades. A total of four furrows extend transversely to the longitudinal axis of the body around the whole body, which divide these superficially into five regions:

- The first or prostomial region forms the head on which there are no structures, such as filiform cirri or clavae, which are used in some modern modes of sensory perception. Eyes can not be identified. The mouth region is inconspicuous and does not have warren-like projections (papillae).
- The second region contains the first pair of legs. A short transverse furrow is slightly displaced towards the back, opposite the center line of the segment.
- The third and fourth regions bear the second and third pairs of legs. Here there are also shorter transverse furrows on the back, which run out laterally to the legs. They are shifted forward against the center line of the segment.
- In the fifth region there is a transverse furrow on the abdomen, which runs out slightly laterally on the back line.

The length ratio of the segments 2 to 5 is indicated as 1: 1.3: 1.3: 2.

The legs are presumably telescopically retracted and each carry four unequally long claws arranged asymmetrically with respect to the middle of the leg. Other features, such as the structure of the stiletto apparatus or the mucous musculature, cannot be recognized; Also the position of the sex opening (gonopore) with respect to the anus, which could have given further indications as to the class to which the genus belongs, cannot be ascertained.

== Habitat ==
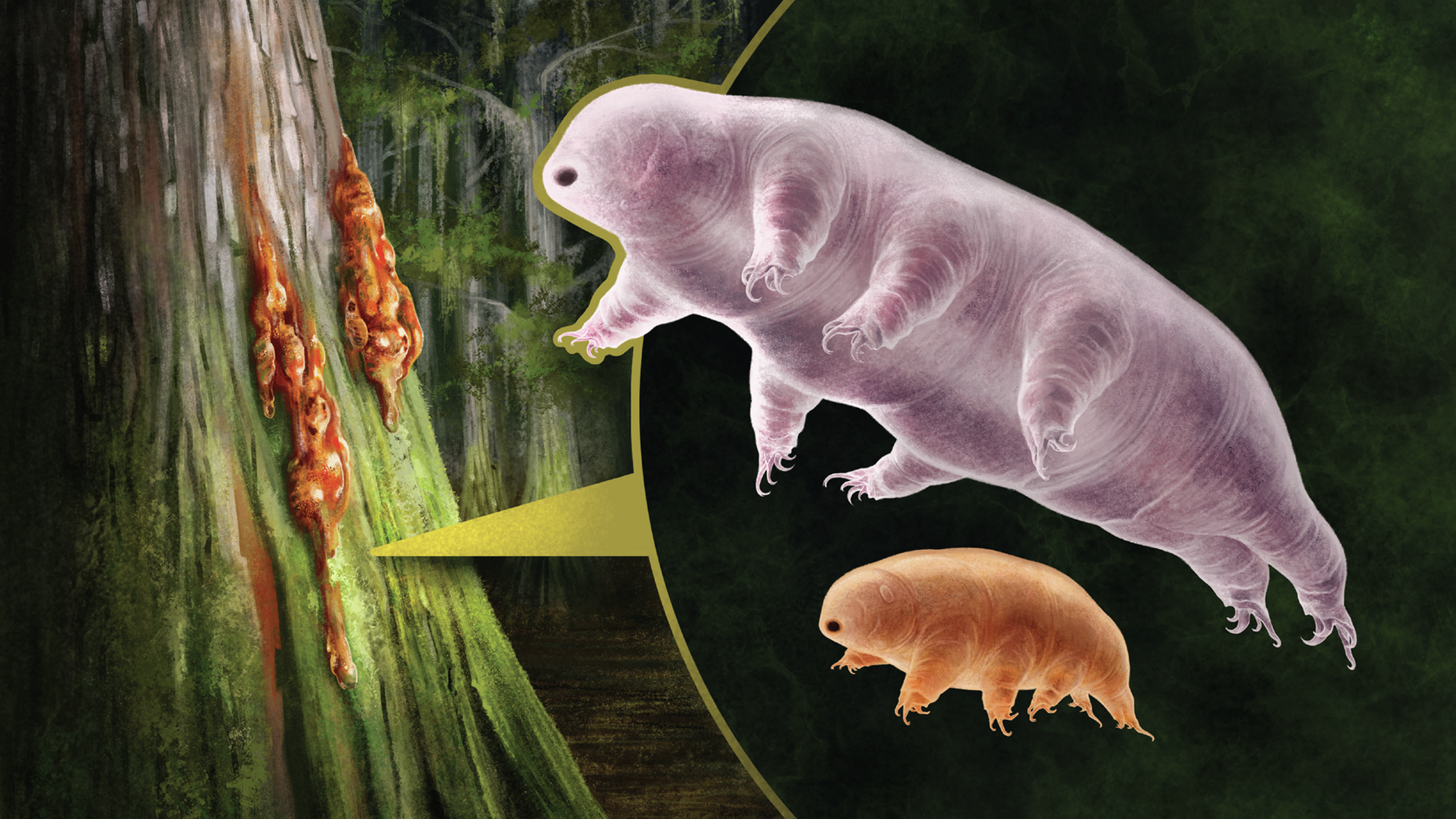
Hypothetical life restoration of the coeval Beorn (top) and Aerobius (bottom)

The origin of the present amber specimen is unknown. It was part of secondary sediment deposits on the lake shore of Cedar Lake, not far from the Saskatchewan River outlet in the Canadian province of Manitoba. Observations suggest that the habitat of Beorn may have been a swamp-like wetland biotope.

Another tardigrade specimen was identified in the same amber piece as Beorn. It is much smaller than Beorn, and is curled and notably shriveled. However, Cooper refrained from describing this individual in 1964 due to his inability to reliably determine its anatomical details. New imaging techniques developed since then allowed for later researchers to describe the smaller specimen in detail. It was named in 2024 as the new genus Aerobius.

== Classification ==
The affiliation of Beorn with the tardigrades is certain. Moreover, the species can even be assigned to one of the three modern classes - the absence of head structures such as cirri and clavae and back armoring suggests a placement within the Eutardigrada. Within this class, Beorn leggi was originally placed in a separate family Beornidae. However, later studies based on more detailed imageing reinterpreted it as belonging to the Hypsibiidae.

To determine the relationships of Aerobius and Beorn, Mapalo, Wolfe & Ortega-Hernández (2024) phylogenetically analyzed a combination of morphological features and rRNA sequences. They recovered these taxa as closely related members of the tardigrade family Hypsibioidea. These results are displayed in the cladogram below, with extinct species designated with a dagger (†):

- - Milnesium
  - - - Eohypsibioidea
      - Macrobiotoidea
    - Isohypsibioidea
      - Ramajendas frigidus
      - - Isohypsibius prosostomus
        - - Halobiotus crispae
          - - Doryphoribius macrodon
            - - Hexapodibius micronyx
              - †Paradoryphoribius
    - Hypsibioidea
      - Ramazzottius oberhaeuseri
      - - Microhypsibius truncatus
        - Acutuncus antarcticus
        - Calohypsibius ornatus
        - - Hypsibius dujardini
          - †Beorn
          - †Aerobius
