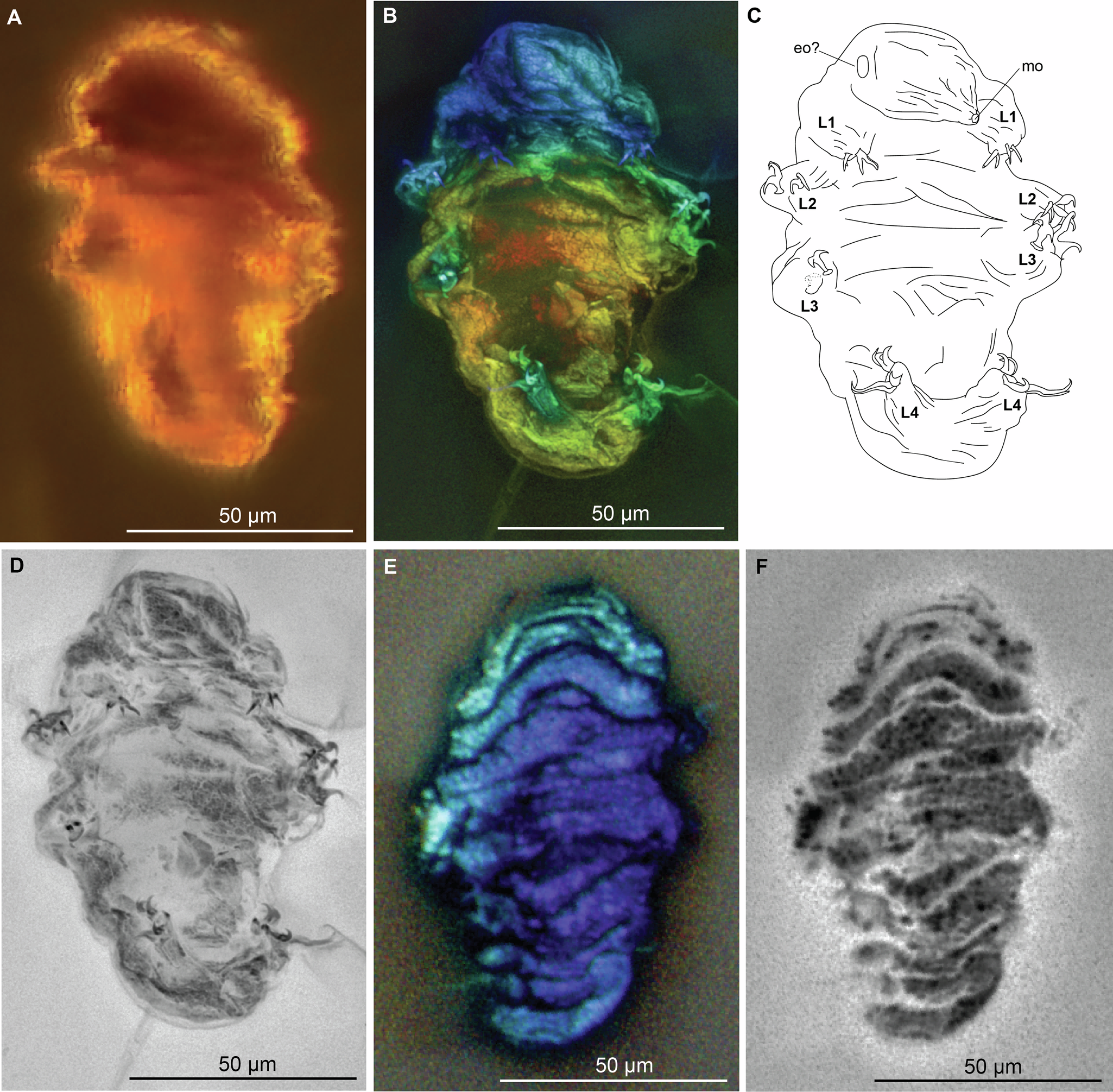
- Holotype specimen under various imaging techniques

Scientific classification
- Kingdom: Animalia
- Phylum: Tardigrada
- Class: Eutardigrada
- Order: Parachela
- Superfamily: Hypsibioidea
- Genus: †Aerobius; Mapalo, Wolfe & Ortega-Hernández, 2024
- Species: †A. dactylus

Binomial name
- †Aerobius dactylus Mapalo, Wolfe & Ortega-Hernández, 2024

= Aerobius =

Aerobius Temporal range: Late Cretaceous, Campanian

Genus of extinct tardigrades

Aerobius is a genus of extinct tardigrades ("water bears") of the superfamily Hypsibioidea. The genus contains a single species, A. dactylus, known from a single individual preserved in amber. The Aerobius holotype is preserved in the same piece of Late Cretaceous amber as Beorn, another extinct tardigrade. The specimen was found near Cedar Lake in Manitoba, Canada.

== Discovery and naming ==
The Aerobius holotype specimen, MCZ PALE-4586 is embedded in a piece of amber collected in 1940 by William M. Legg in Manitoba, Canada. The type locality is near where the Saskatchewan River enters Cedar Lake. The individual is curled and notably shriveled. The holotype of Beorn is preserved in the same amber piece as Aerobius. In the 1964 description of Beorn, Kenneth W. Cooper noted the presence of a much smaller—seemingly poorly preserved—tardigrade potentially distinct from Beorne in the same amber matrix. However, he refrained from describing this individual due to his inability to reliably determine its anatomical details. New imaging techniques developed since then allowed for later researchers to describe the smaller specimen in detail.

In 2024, Mapalo, Wolfe & Ortega-Hernández described Aerobius dactylus as a new genus and species of tardigrade based on the smaller individual preserved in amber alongside Beorn. The generic name, Aerobius, is derived from the modified Greek prefix "aero-", denoting "air", in reference to the holotype's apparent midair suspension in amber. The specific name, dactylus, is derived from the Latin word "dactylus", meaning "finger", referencing the distinctive claws of the holotype.

Aerobius represents one of the only known fossil tardigrade species. The first named tardigrade was Beorn in 1964. It was followed by Milnesium swolenskyi—a species of the extant genus Milnesium from the Late Cretaceous (Turonian) of New Jersey—in 2000, representing the oldest known tardigrade. Paradoryphoribius, the youngest known fossil tardigrade from the Miocene of the Dominican Republic, was named in 2021.

== Description ==
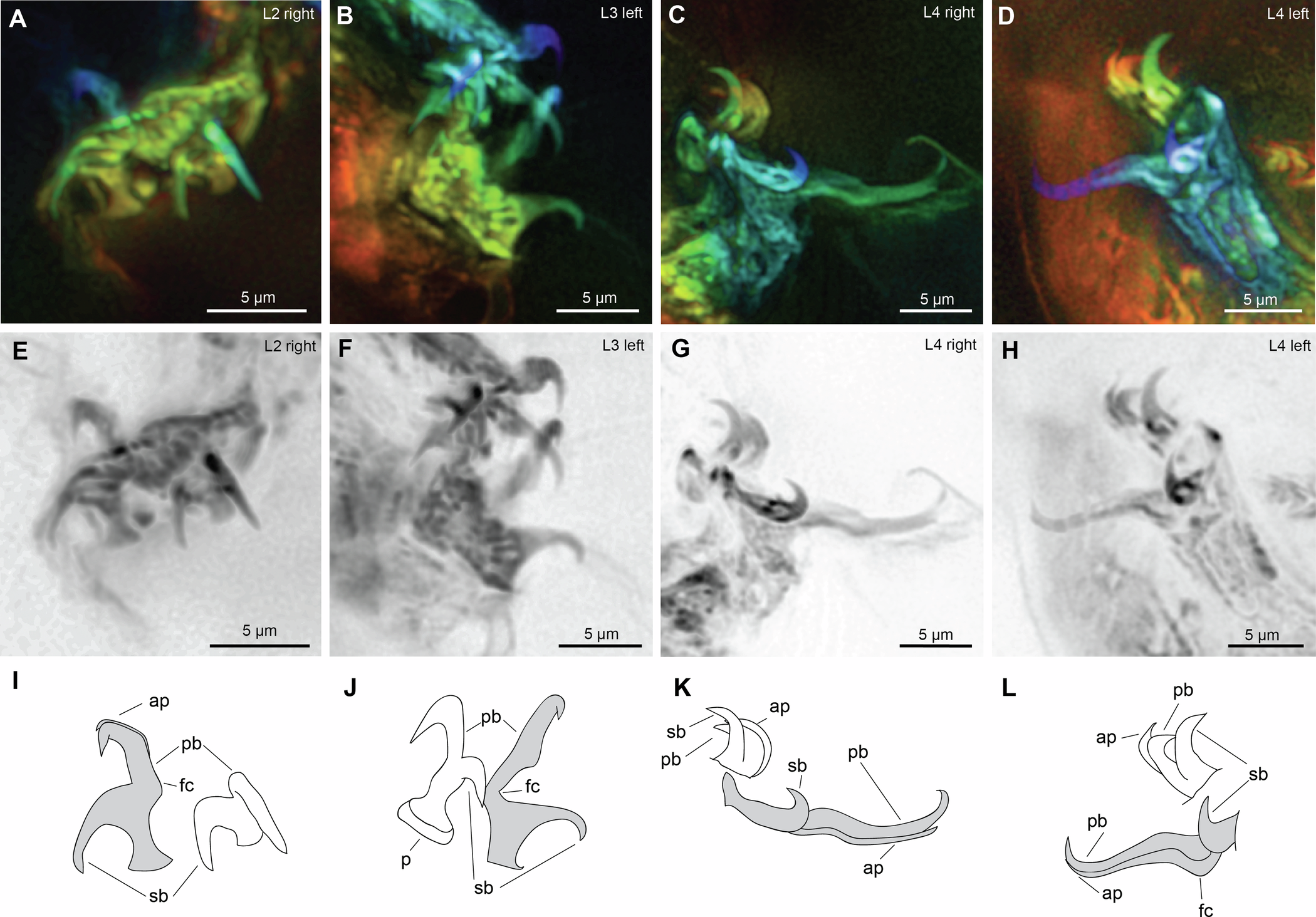
Details of the claws of Aerobius

Like in other tardigrades, the general body shape of Aerobius is compact and barrel-like, with four short pairs of claw-tipped lobopodous legs. The size of the claws on the first, second, and third legs are generally similar, but the claws on the fourth leg are drastically different in size and shape.

In its shriveled state, the Aerobius holotype specimen measures about 0.10 millimeters in length. There are no clear protuberances on the cuticle. No eyespots are visible. An elliptical organ is faintly visible on the side of the head, and the mouth hole at the front of the head is smooth.

== Classification ==
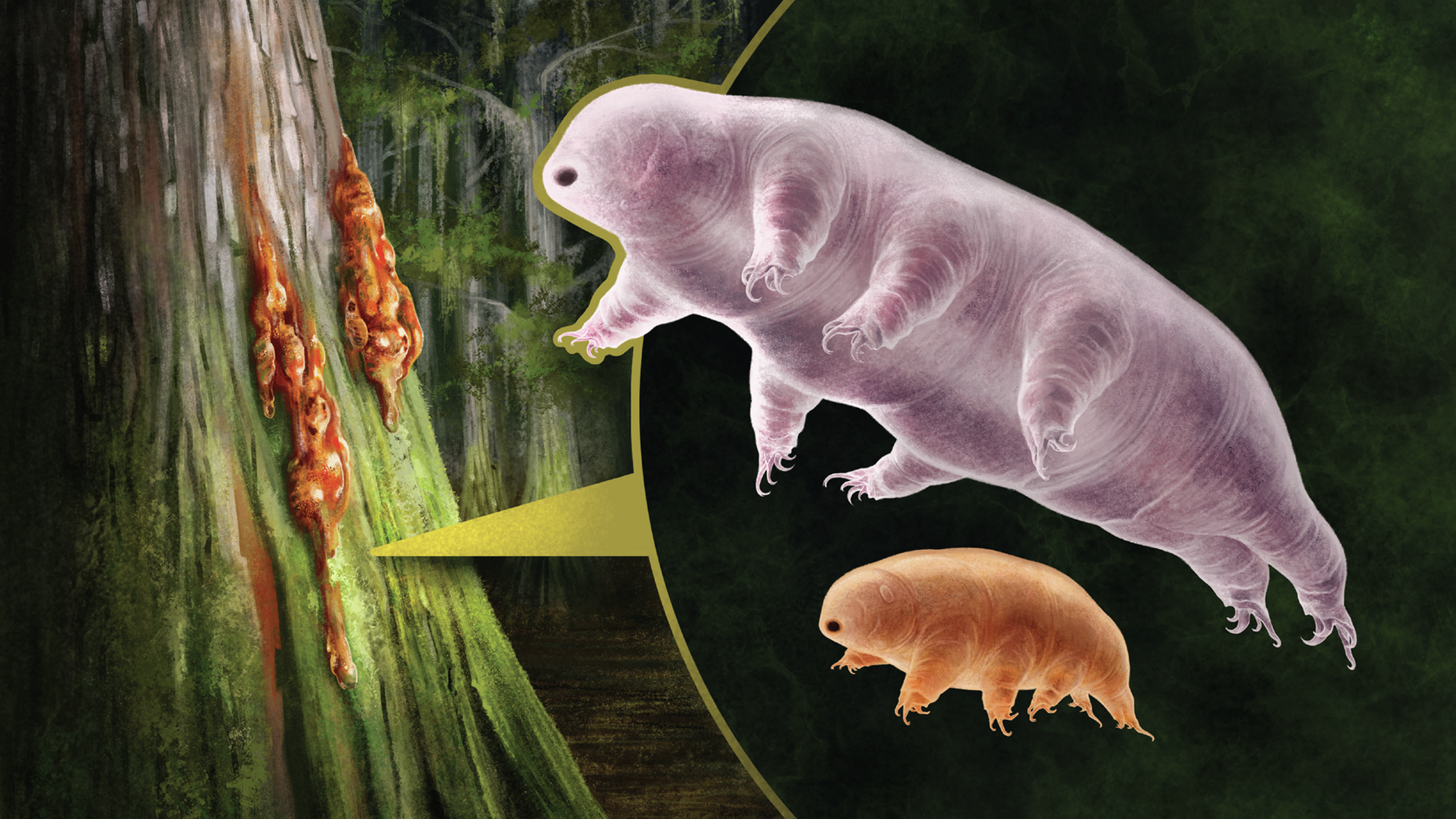
Hypothetical life restoration of the coeval Beorn (top) and Aerobius (bottom)

To determine the relationships of Aerobius, Mapalo, Wolfe & Ortega-Hernández (2024) phylogenetically analyzed a combination of morphological features and rRNA sequences. They recovered Aerobius and the contemporary Beorn as closely related members of the tardigrade family Hypsibioidea. These results are displayed in the cladogram below, with extinct species designated with a dagger (†):

- - Milnesium
  - - - Eohypsibioidea
      - Macrobiotoidea
    - Isohypsibioidea
      - Ramajendas frigidus
      - - Isohypsibius prosostomus
        - - Halobiotus crispae
          - - Doryphoribius macrodon
            - - Hexapodibius micronyx
              - †Paradoryphoribius
    - Hypsibioidea
      - Ramazzottius oberhaeuseri
      - - Microhypsibius truncatus
        - Acutuncus antarcticus
        - Calohypsibius ornatus
        - - Hypsibius dujardini
          - †Beorn
          - †Aerobius

== See also ==
- Beorn (tardigrade)
- Milnesium swolenskyi
- Paradoryphoribius
- Tardigrade (evolutionary history)
