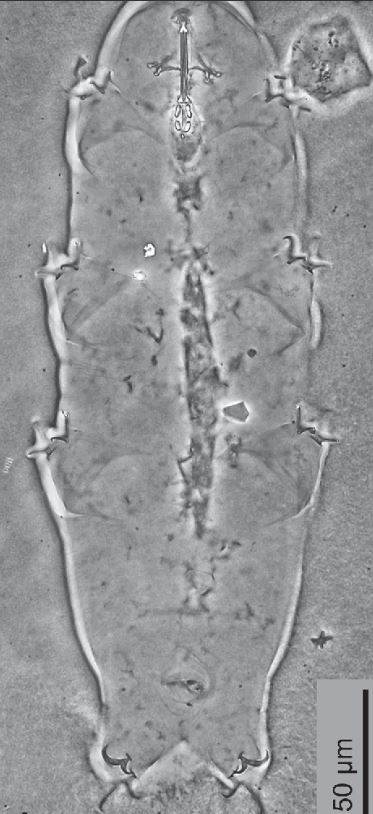

Scientific classification
- Kingdom: Animalia
- Phylum: Tardigrada
- Class: Eutardigrada
- Order: Parachela
- Family: Hypsibiidae
- Genus: Hypsibius
- Species: H. vaskelae

Binomial name
- Hypsibius vaskelae (Tumanov, 2018)
- Holotype: near Vaskelovo railway station, Russiq

= Hypsibius vaskelae =

Species of tardigrade

Hypsibius vaskelae is a species of tardigrade (water bear) in the family Hypsibiidae. It was discovered in a freshwater environment near Saint Petersburg, Russia, and formally described in 2018 by Denis Tumanov of Saint Petersburg State University. This microscopic invertebrate is characterised by its wrinkled dorsal cuticle and the presence of distinctive cuticular bars between the claw bases on all legs. With a body length of just around a quarter of a millimetre, H. vaskelae belongs to a phylum of resilient organisms known for their ability to withstand extreme environmental conditions. Though found in a freshwater lake, it is considered a semi-terrestrial species that likely entered the aquatic environment accidentally.

== Description ==
Hypsibius vaskelae has a small, white body measuring between 192.5 and 237.5 micrometres in length. Its most distinctive feature is a wrinkled dorsal (upper) cuticle consisting of a system of dorso-lateral longitudinal and transverse folds with smaller irregular folds between them. This cuticular pattern is more prominent in the posterior (rear) region of the body, while the ventral (lower) surface lacks any sculptural elements.

The species possesses a bucco-pharyngeal apparatus (feeding structure) typical of the subfamily Hypsibiinae, with thin paired latero-dorsal transverse crests forming the buccal armature. The pharyngeal bulb is oval-shaped with well-developed apophyses (projections), two elongated macroplacoids (rod-like structures in the pharynx), and a relatively large septulum (small structure between the second macroplacoid and the pharyngeal bulb). Microplacoids are absent. The first macroplacoid is longer than the second and slightly constricted in the middle.

The legs bear small claws of the Hypsibius type, which increase in size from the first to the fourth pair of legs. All claws have well-developed accessory points, narrow bases, and poorly developed smooth lunules (small crescentic structures at the base of the claws). A distinctive feature of H. vaskelae is the presence of thin cuticular bars between the claw bases on all legs, as well as wider but less sclerified (hardened) cuticular bars located near the base of the internal claw on the first three pairs of legs.

== Habitat and distribution ==
Although H. vaskelae was found in a freshwater environment—specifically in dead leaves collected from the bottom of a small unnamed lake near the shoreline in the vicinity of Vaskelovo railway station in Leningrad Region, Russia—it is not considered a typical freshwater species. The shoreline of water bodies represents a transition zone between terrestrial and freshwater ecosystems, where species from both environments can be found.

The specimen was collected alongside other tardigrade species including Hypsibius cf. dujardini, Isohypsibius prosostomus, Isohypsibius sattleri, Diphascon cf. pingue, and Ramazzottius sp., with terrestrial species predominating in the sample. This suggests that H. vaskelae is more likely a semi-terrestrial species that accidentally entered the freshwater habitat, which aligns with the observation that most Hypsibius species are found in terrestrial environments.

At the time of tis original publication, H. vaskelae had only been reported from its type locality in Northwestern Russia. The rarity of this species and its disjunct distribution pattern compared to morphologically similar species might indicate a relict nature of this species complex.

== Taxonomy ==
Hypsibius vaskelae was formally described in 2018 by Denis Tumanov from the Department of Invertebrate Zoology at Saint Petersburg State University. The species name vaskelae is derived from Vaskela, the old Finnish name of the village Vaskelovo, where the species was discovered. It belongs to the genus Hypsibius within the family Hypsibiidae.

The species is most closely related to three other Hypsibius species that also have cuticular bars between the claw bases of their legs: H. marcelli (reported from Argentina), H. septulatus (reported from Peru), and H. shaanxiensis (reported from China). However, H. vaskelae differs from these related species in several morphological features, including its wrinkled dorsal cuticle, thinner claws, and the presence of lunules on the claws of all legs. The wrinkled dorsal cuticle and distinctive cuticular bars between claw bases are important taxonomic features, characteristics that are increasingly being used to refine tardigrade classification.
