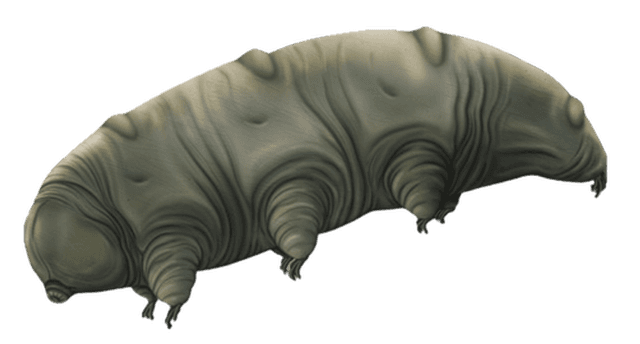
- Life reconstruction of Paradoryphoribius

Scientific classification
- Kingdom: Animalia
- Phylum: Tardigrada
- Class: Eutardigrada
- Order: Parachela
- Superfamily: Isohypsibioidea
- Genus: †Paradoryphoribius; Mapalo et al. 2021
- Species: †P. chronocaribbeus

Binomial name
- †Paradoryphoribius chronocaribbeus Mapalo et al., 2021

= Paradoryphoribius =

Paradoryphoribius Temporal range: Miocene (Burdigalian), ~16 Ma

Extinct genus of fossil tardigrade

Paradoryphoribius is an extinct genus of tardigrades from the order Parachela. It is the third fossil tardigrade to be named, described in 2021 from Miocene Dominican amber from the Dominican Republic. The type, and currently only species, is P. chronocaribbeus.

== Discovery and naming ==
The holotype was discovered in Miocene Dominican amber from the Dominican Republic. The amber specimen also contains three ants, a beetle, and a flower.

Paradoryphoribius chronocaribbeus was named and described by Mapalo et al. (2021), making it the first extinct tardigrade known from the Cenozoic and is also the first tardigrade known from the Miocene.

== Description ==
It has a length of 539 microns.

== Classification ==
In their description of Aerobius dactylus, Mapalo, Wolfe & Ortega-Hernández (2024) phylogenetically analyzed a combination of morphological features and rRNA sequences of multiple known tardigrade species. They recovered Paradoryphorybius as the sister taxon of Hexapodibius micronyx. These results are displayed in the cladogram below, with extinct species designated with a dagger (†):

- Eutardigrada
  - Milnesium
  - Parachela
    - - Eohypsibioidea
      - Macrobiotoidea
    - Isohypsibioidea
      - Ramajendas frigidus
      - - Isohypsibius prosostomus
        - - Halobiotus crispae
          - - Doryphoribius macrodon
            - - Hexapodibius micronyx
              - †Paradoryphoribius
    - Hypsibioidea
      - Ramazzottius oberhaeuseri
      - - Microhypsibius truncatus
        - Acutuncus antarcticus
        - Calohypsibius ornatus
        - - Hypsibius dujardini
          - †Beorn
          - †Aerobius
