= Ramazzotti (surname) =

Ramazzotti (pronounced [ramatˈtsɔtti]) is an Italian surname from Central Italy, originally referring to people whose job consisted in sweeping (ramazzare) streets. Notable people with the surname include:

- Angelo Ramazzotti (1800–1861), Italian Roman Catholic prelate
- Bob Ramazzotti (1917–2000), American baseball player
- Eros Ramazzotti (born 1963), Italian singer
- Gianluca Ramazzotti (born 1970), Italian actor
- Giuseppe Ramazzotti (1898–1986), Italian engineer and author
- Micaela Ramazzotti (born 1979), Italian actress
- Riccardo Ramazzotti (born 1979), Italian footballer
- Serafino Ramazzotti (1846–1920), Italian painter

== See also ==
- Rafael Ramazotti (born 1988), Brazilian footballer
- Ramazzotti (disambiguation)
- Romazzotti (disambiguation)
