= Diphascon faialense =

Scientific classification
- Kingdom: Animalia
- Phylum: Tardigrada
- Class: Eutardigrada
- Order: Parachela
- Family: Hypsibiidae
- Genus: Diphascon
- Species: D. faialense

Binomial name
- Diphascon faialense Fontoura & Pilato, 2007

Species of tardigrade

Diphascon faialense is a species of tardigrade in the genus Diphascon of the family Hypsibiidae and the subfamily Diphasconinae. The species is endemic to the Azores. The species was first described and named by Paulo Fontoura and Giovanni Pilato in 2007. The specific name refers to Faial Island, on which it was found.
