= Ramazzotti =

Ramazzotti may refer to:

- Ramazzotti (liqueur), Italian liqueur
- Ramazzotti (surname), Italian surname

== See also ==
- Colony Ramazzoti, art festival in North Macedonia
- Ramazzottius
- Romazzotti (disambiguation)
