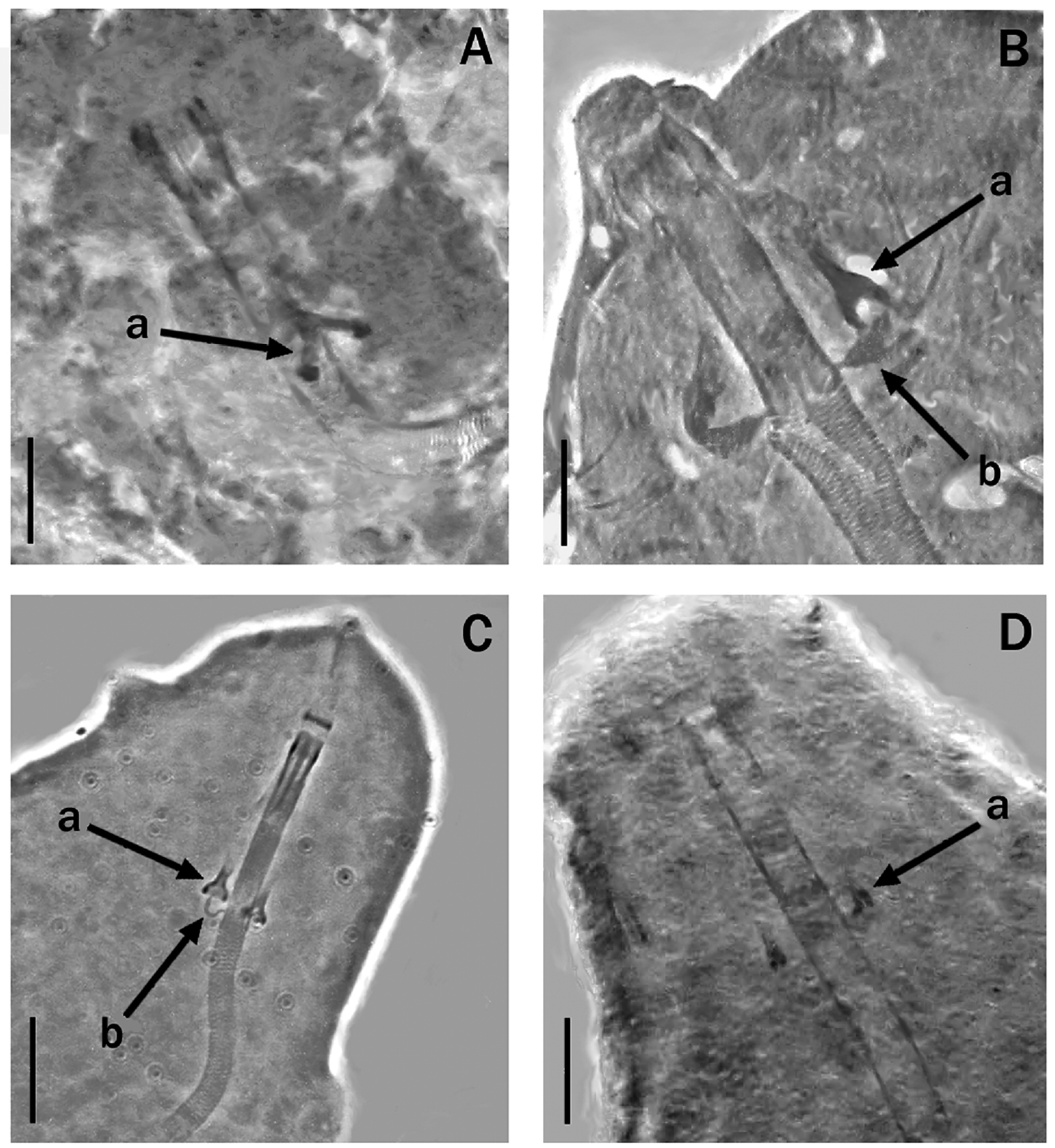
- Microscopic diagram showing Astatumen trinacriae at Fig D

Scientific classification
- Domain: Eukaryota
- Kingdom: Animalia
- Phylum: Tardigrada
- Class: Eutardigrada
- Order: Parachela
- Family: Hypsibiidae
- Genus: Astatumen; Pilato, 1997

Species
- see text

= Astatumen =

Genus of tardigrades

Astatumen is a genus of tardigrades in the class Eutardigrada found in Romania. Species of this genus were originally categorized in the genus Itaquascon until 1997.

== Species ==
- Astatumen bartosi (Wêglarska, 1959)
- Astatumen tamaensis (Sudzuki 1975)
- Astatumen tamurai (Ito 1990)
- Astatumen trinacriae (Arcidiacono, 1962)
