= Sandra Claxton =

Australian zoologist (1945–2023)

Sandra Kaye Siebels Claxton (1945–2023) was an Australian zoologist notable for her contributions to the study of tardigrades, microscopic organisms.

Diphascon claxtonae, a species of tardigrade, is named for her.

== Early life and education ==
Claxton was born in Sydney and raised in Wagga Wagga. She obtained a biology certificate from Sydney Technical College and a BSc in botany and zoology from University of Sydney.

Following the birth of her son in 1972, Claxton was diagnosed with severe rheumatoid arthritis, which significantly impacted her mobility and required numerous medical interventions. Despite these challenges, she pursued further education, earning a second BSc in palaeontology and an MSc, followed by a PhD from Macquarie University. Her PhD thesis, completed in 2004, was recognized with the Vice-Chancellor's Commendation for exceptional merit at Macquarie University.

== Career ==
Her early career involved work at the NSW Department of Agriculture's Veterinary Research Station in Glenfield.

Claxton focused her research on Australian terrestrial tardigrades, a subject previously little-explored. She adapted her work methods to accommodate her physical limitations, including setting up a home laboratory. Her academic work resulted in the identification of over 70 new tardigrade species and notable contributions to the taxonomy of the genus Minibiotus.

== Research ==
Her research into tardigrades, often known as water bears, was conducted amidst frequent health-related interruptions, including hospitalizations and surgeries. Despite visual impairment caused by a medication side effect and her ongoing struggle with arthritis, Claxton continued her research. Her 2013 review of terrestrial and marine tardigrades, co-authored with Reinhardt Kristensen, remains an influential reference in tardigrade studies.
