= Mixibius =

Scientific classification
- Kingdom: Animalia
- Phylum: Tardigrada
- Class: Eutardigrada
- Order: Parachela
- Family: Hypsibiidae
- Genus: Mixibius; Pilato, 1992

Species
- see text

Genus of tardigrades

Mixibius is a genus of water bear or moss piglet, a tardigrade in the class Eutardigrada.

== Species ==
Mixibius contains the following species:

- Mixibius felix Pilato, Sabella, D'Urso & Lisi, 2017
- Mixibius fueginus Pilato & Binda, 1996
- Mixibius gibbosus Lisi, Daza, Londoño & Quiroga, 2022
- Mixibius ninguidus Biserov, 1999
- Mixibius ornatus Pilato, Binda, Napolitano & Moncada, 2002
- Mixibius parvus Lisi, Sabella & Pilato, 2014
- Mixibius pilatoi L. Wang, 2009
- Mixibius saracenus (Pilato, 1973)
- Mixibius schnurae Pilato, Lisi & Binda, 2010
- Mixibius sutirae Pilato, Binda & Lisi, 2004
- Mixibius tibetanus H. Li & X. Li, 2008
