= Hypsibius septulatus =

Scientific classification
- Domain: Eukaryota
- Kingdom: Animalia
- Phylum: Tardigrada
- Class: Eutardigrada
- Order: Parachela
- Family: Hypsibiidae
- Genus: Hypsibius
- Species: H. septulatus

Binomial name
- Hypsibius septulatus (Pilato, Binda, Napolitano & Moncada, 2004)

Species of tardigrade

Hypsibius septulatus is a species of tardigrade in the class Eutardigrada. The species is only known to be found in Peru. Hypsibius septulatus has unsculptured cuticles with around 22 dorsal undulations. It has two macroplacoids and a septulum on the first three pair of legs.
