= Milnesium swolenskyi =

Milnesium swolenskyi Temporal range: Late Turonian

Scientific classification
- Domain: Eukaryota
- Kingdom: Animalia
- Phylum: Tardigrada
- Class: Eutardigrada
- Order: Apochela
- Family: Milnesiidae
- Genus: Milnesium
- Species: †M. swolenskyi

Binomial name
- †Milnesium swolenskyi Bertolani and Grimaldi 2000

Species of tardigrade

Milnesium swolenskyi is a species of tardigrade from the Cretaceous period. It, Beorn and Paradoryphoribius are the only known tardigrade genera in the fossil record. The type specimen AMNH NJ-796 was found in Turonian New Jersey amber, from about 93.9 to 89.8 million years ago (mya).

== Literature ==
1. Guidetti R, Bertolani R (2005) Tardigrade taxonomy: an updated check list of the taxa and a list of characters for their identification. Zootaxa 845: 1-46
2. Penney D. Biodiversity of Fossils in Amber from the Major World Deposits, Siri Scientific Press, 2010 - 304 pp.
