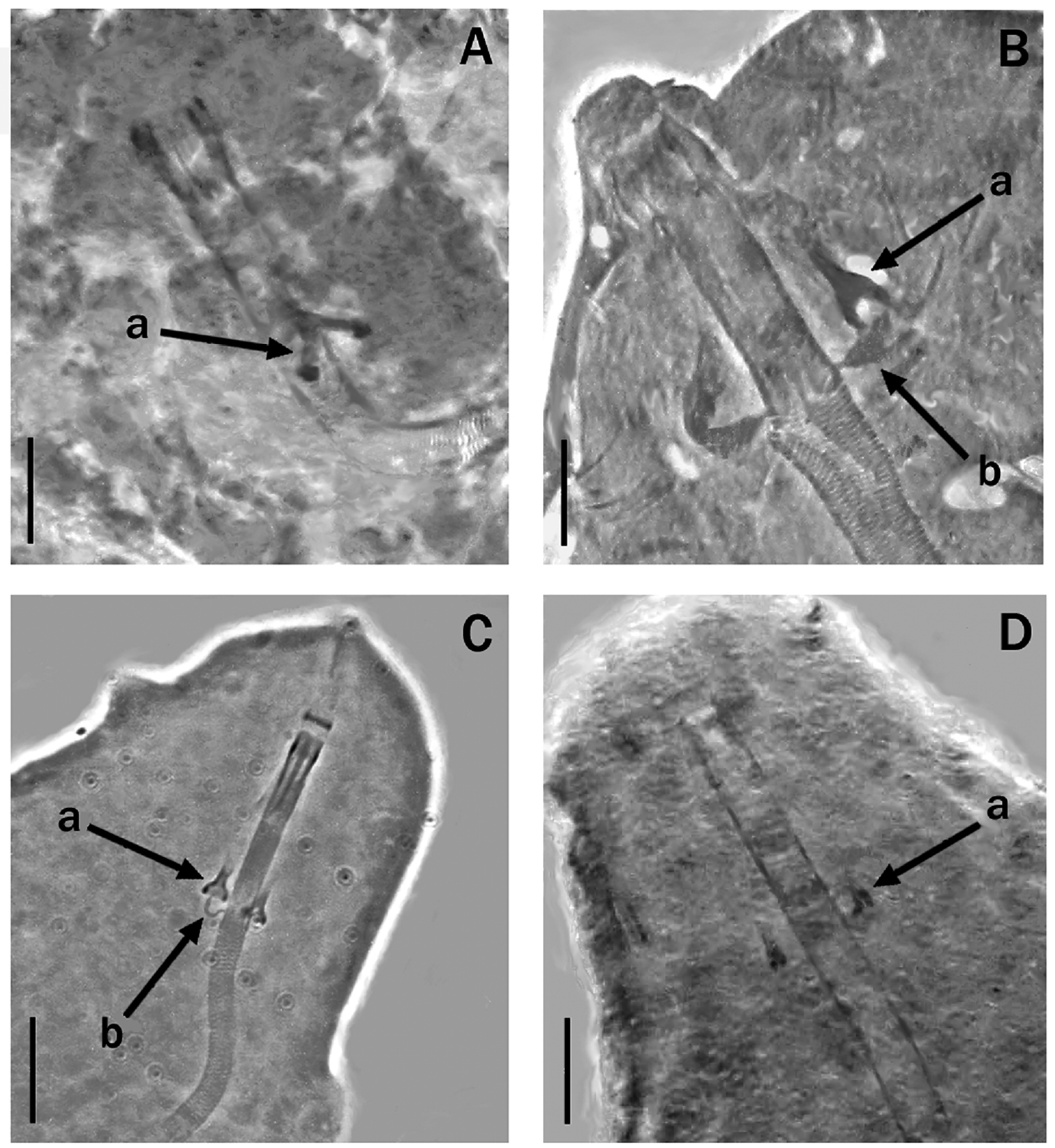
- Microscopic diagram showing Platicrista angustata at B

Scientific classification
- Kingdom: Animalia
- Phylum: Tardigrada
- Class: Eutardigrada
- Order: Parachela
- Family: Hypsibiidae
- Genus: Platicrista; Pilato, 1987

Species
- see text

= Platicrista =

Genus of tardigrades

Platicrista is a genus of tardigrade (water bears) in the class Eutardigrada.

== Species ==
- Platicrista affine (Mihelcic, 1951)
- Platicrista angustata (Murray, 1905)
- Platicrista cheleusis Kathman 1990
- Platicrista horribilis Kaczmarek and Michalczyk, 2003
- Platicrista itaquasconoide (Durante and Maucci, 1975)
- Platicrista ramsayi Marley, 2006
