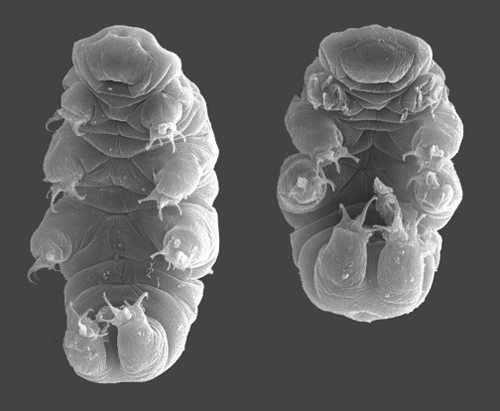
- Hypsibius dujardini

Scientific classification
- Domain: Eukaryota
- Kingdom: Animalia
- Phylum: Tardigrada
- Class: Eutardigrada
- Order: Parachela
- Family: Hypsibiidae
- Subfamily: Hypsibiinae
- Genus: Hypsibius; Ehrenberg, 1848

Type species
- Macrobiotus dujardini Doyère, 1840

= Hypsibius =

Genus of tardigrades

Hypsibius is a genus of tardigrades in the class Eutardigrada.

== Genome sequencing ==
The genome of Hypsibius dujardini has been sequenced. Hypsibius dujardini has a compact genome and a generation time of about two weeks. It can be cultured indefinitely and cryopreserved. This sequenced strain has been redesignated Hypsibius exemplaris since 2018.

== Species ==
The genus includes the following species:

- Hypsibius allisoni Horning, Schuster and Grigarick, 1978
- Hypsibius americanus (Packard, 1873)
- Hypsibius antonovae (Biserov 1990)
- Hypsibius arcticus (Murray 1907)
- Hypsibius biscuitiformis Bartos, 1960
- Hypsibius calcaratus Bartos, 1935
- Hypsibius camelopardalis Ramazzotti and Maucci, 1983
- Hypsibius conifer Mihelcic, 1938
- Hypsibius convergens (Urbanowicz, 1925)
- Hypsibius dujardini (Doyère, 1840)
- Hypsibius exemplaris (Gąsiorek, 2018)
- Hypsibius fuhrmanni (Heinis, 1914)
- Hypsibius giusepperamazzotti Sudzuki, 1975
- Hypsibius heardensis Miller, McInnes and Bergstrom, 2005
- Hypsibius hypostomus Bartos, 1935
- Hypsibius iharosi Bartos, 1941
- Hypsibius janetscheki Ramazzotti 1968
- Hypsibius klebelsbergi Mihelcic 1959
- Hypsibius macrocalcaratus Beasley, 1988
- Hypsibius maculatus Iharos, 1969
- Hypsibius marcelli Pilato, 1990
- Hypsibius microps Thulin, 1928
- Hypsibius morikawai Ito, 1995
- Hypsibius multituberculatus Pilato, Binda and Lisi, 2003
- Hypsibius novaezeelandiae Pilato and Binda, 1997
- Hypsibius pachyunguis Maucci, 1996
- Hypsibius pallidus Thulin, 1911
- Hypsibius pedrottii Bertolani, Manicardi and Gibertoni, 1987
- Hypsibius pradellii Bertolani and Rebecchi, 1996
- Hypsibius ragonesei Binda and Pilato, 1985
- Hypsibius roanensis Nelson and McGlothlin, 1993
- Hypsibius runae Bartos, 1941
- Hypsibius scaber Maucci, 1987
- Hypsibius scabropygus Cuénot, 1929
- Hypsibius septulatus Pilato, Binda, Napolitano and Moncada, 2004
- Hypsibius seychellensis Pilato, Binda and Lisi, 2006
- Hypsibius simoizumii Sudzuki, 1964
- Hypsibius stiliferus Abe, 2004
- Hypsibius thaleri Dastych, 2004
- Hypsibius vaskelae Tumanov
- Hypsibius zetlandicus (Murray, 1907)
