= Parascon =

Scientific classification
- Kingdom: Animalia
- Phylum: Tardigrada
- Class: Eutardigrada
- Order: Parachela
- Family: Hypsibiidae
- Genus: Parascon; Pilato and Binda, 1987

Species
- see text

Genus of tardigrades

Parascon is a genus of water bear or moss piglet, a tardigrade in the class Eutardigrada.

== Species ==
- Parascon nichollsae Pilato and Lisi, 2004
- Parascon schusteri Pilato & Binda 1987
