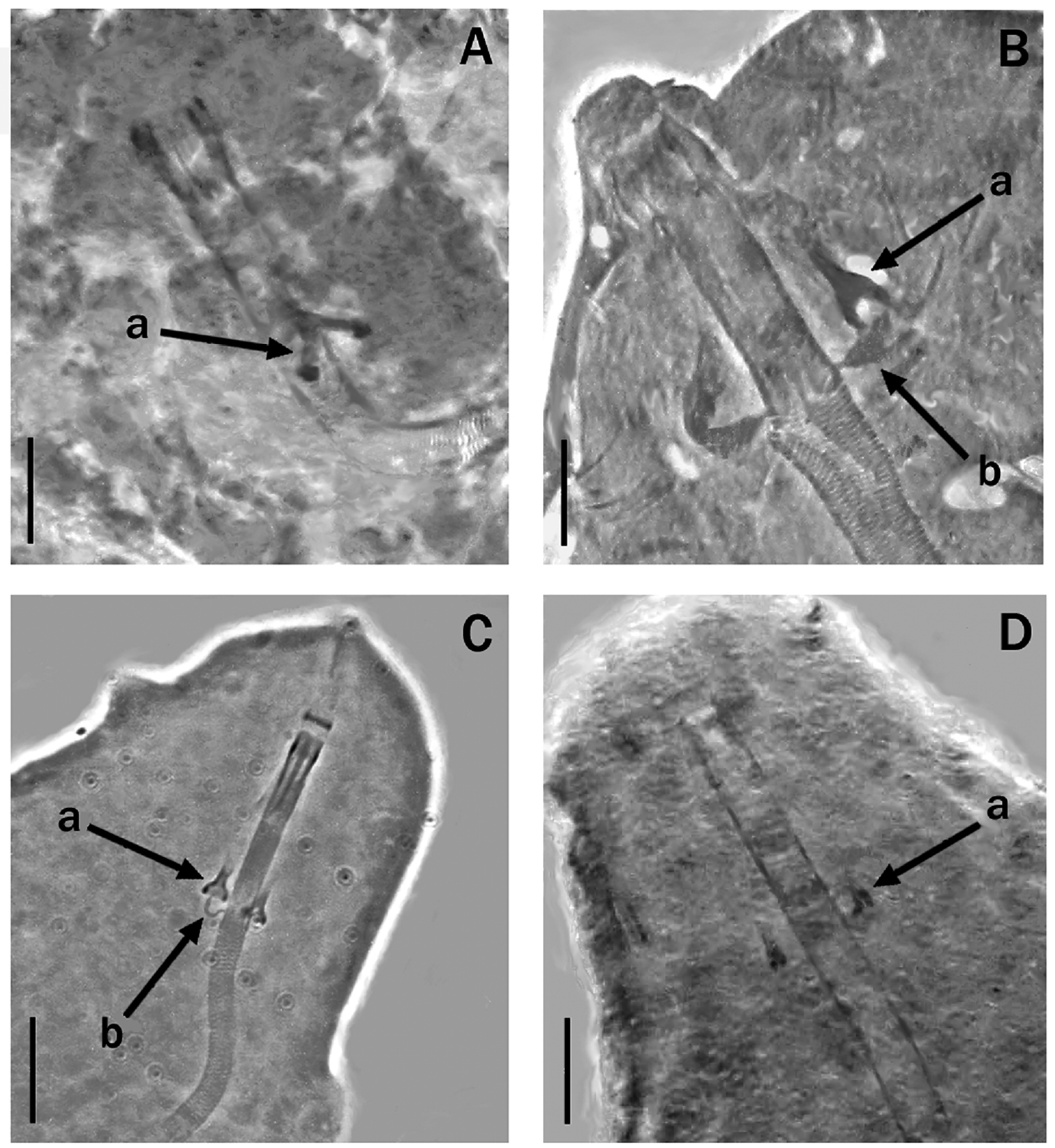
- A microscopic diagram showing Mesocrista spitzbergensis at fig A

Scientific classification
- Kingdom: Animalia
- Phylum: Tardigrada
- Class: Eutardigrada
- Order: Parachela
- Family: Hypsibiidae
- Genus: Mesocrista; Pilato, 1987

Species
- see text

= Mesocrista =

Genus of tardigrades

Mesocrista is a genus of water bear or moss piglet, a tardigrade in the class Eutardigrada.

== Species ==
Mesocrista contains the following species:

- Mesocrista marcusi (Rudescu, 1964)
- Mesocrista spitzbergensis (Richters, 1903)
