= Hypsibius marcelli =

Scientific classification
- Domain: Eukaryota
- Kingdom: Animalia
- Phylum: Tardigrada
- Class: Eutardigrada
- Order: Parachela
- Family: Hypsibiidae
- Genus: Hypsibius
- Species: H. marcelli

Binomial name
- Hypsibius marcelli (Pilato, 1990)

Species of tardigrade

Hypsibius marcelli is a species of tardigrade in the class Eutardigrada. The species from described from brackish water on Tierra del Fuego. The species also has a disjunct Gondwanan distribution, reported from New Zealand.
