= Serafino Ramazzotti =

Italian painter (1846–1920)

Serafino Ramazzotti (1846 – 1920) was an Italian painter and sculptor.

== Biography ==
He was born in Sozzago in the province of Novara, and studied at the Albertina Academy of Fine Arts in Turin, where he first trained with the painter. Among his works are La povera fioraia; Lo spirito di libertà; Il ritorno dal campo; Psiche; Giacomino; Luciella; La paura del bambino; Flirtation; and Mia suocera. He also exhibited a number of terracotta statues. At the 1876 Centennial Exposition in Philadelphia, Serafino's Lo spirito di libertà was displayed. In the acts of the Academy of Fine Arts of Milan in 1893, he is listed as an associate member, as a sculptor active in Padua.
