= Giuseppe Ramazzotti =

Italian zoologist

- With some of his collection of pipes
- Born: 22 November 1898; Milan
- Died: 18 October 1986 (aged 87); Milan
- Occupation: Zoologist
- Known for: Studies of tardigrades
- Notable work: Il Phylum Tardigrada

Giuseppe Ramazzotti (22 November 1898 – 18 October 1986) was an Italian engineer and author, known for his studies of tardigrades. A genus of tardigrades, Ramazzottius, is dedicated to him.

== Biography ==
Giuseppe Ramazzotti was the only child of Ausano Ramazzotti (founder of the liqueur factory Amaro Ramazzotti) and Maria Ferrario. In 1923 he married Angelina Buzzati, sister of Adriano Buzzati Traverso and Dino Buzzati, with whom he had daughters Alba Maria and Laura.

He volunteered as an officer of the Alpini in the Mandrone battalion on the Adamello mountains and on the Tonale Pass during the First World War. After the war he graduated in chemical engineering, setting up a chemical laboratory near his home. He was a radio amateur, starting an industrial radio production business (Radio Apparecchi Milano), but it went bankrupt through the actions of a business partner. From the 1930s he worked as an engineer at Ducati, which produced capacitors, and in the 1940s he was appointed president of the "Società scientifica radio brevetti Ducati".

He developed a passion for natural sciences and for tobacco pipes. He was the largest collector of pipes in Europe and, under the name of Eppe Ramazzotti, he published several books, including Il libro delle pipe ("The Book of Pipes") in 1966, co-written with his brother-in-law Dino Buzzati. He also wrote on many other subjects: in the mid-1940s he published books on trains, spiders, the moon, and power stations.

== Zoology of tardigrades ==
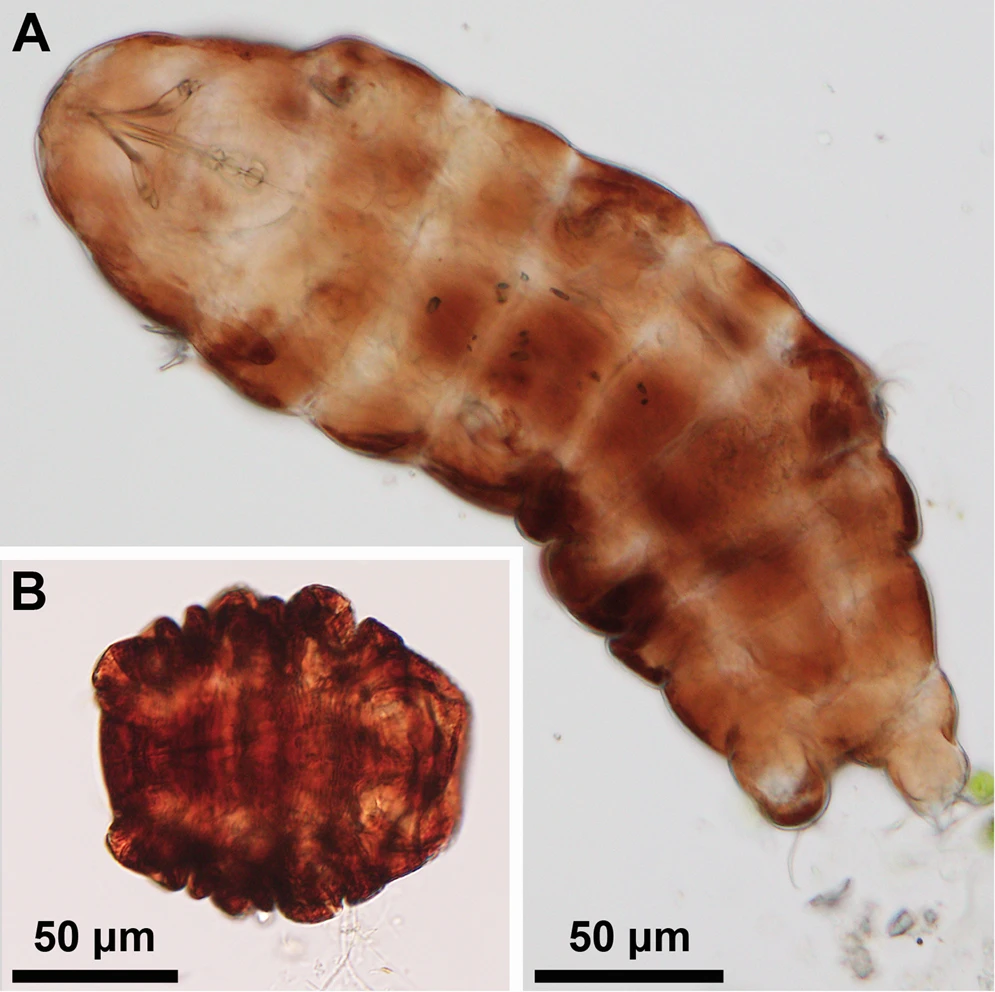
The tardigrade genus Ramazzottius (active and 'tun' states shown) is named after him.

During the Second World War, after Milan was bombed in 1942, he and his family fled to Abano Terme and then to Belluno; here his other brother-in-law Adriano suggested that he combine his interests in nature and the microscope, studying tardigrades, which soon became another great passion. The whole family moved to Ghiffa and then to Pallanza after the armistice of 1943; here he began to frequent the Italian Institute of Hydrobiology, forming a strong friendship with Vittorio Tonolli and his wife Livia Pirocchi. On the subject of tardigrades, Ramazzotti published important texts for the time and described numerous species. In 1962, he proposed the phylum Tardigrada. At the age of sixty (in 1968) he became a professor at the University of Milan.

== Legacy ==
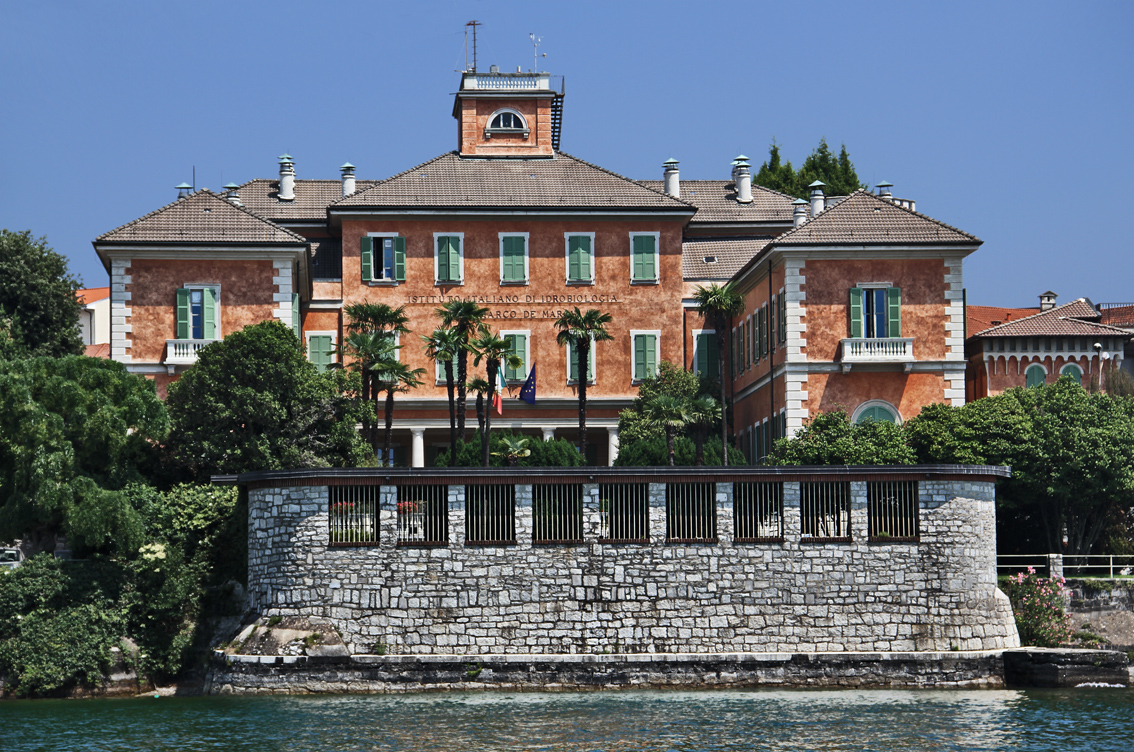
Italian Institute of Hydrobiology at Pallanza on Lake Maggiore, where Ramazzotti studied tardigrades

Ramazzotti died in 1986 and was buried, according to his wishes, near Dino Buzzati, in the chapel of Villa Buzzati in San Pellegrino (a hamlet of Belluno). His pipe collection (which at that point numbered about 1500 pieces) was purchased by a collector friend of his, Fritz Bailender. The natural history collections have been divided between the Museo Civico di Storia Naturale di Milano (minerals), the Museo Civico di Storia Naturale di Verona (tardigrades) and the Italian Institute of Hydrobiology at Pallanza.

From 1974, at the suggestion of Livia Pirocchi Tonolli, who was by then a professor, regular Tardigrade Symposia have been held in Ramazzotti's honour. The first symposium was held in Pallanza at the Italian Institute of Hydrobiology.

== Works ==
- Ramazzotti, Giuseppe; Maucci, Walter (1962). Il Phylum Tardigrada [The Phylum Tardigrada] (in Italian). Vol. 16. Memorie dell'Istituto Italiano di Idrobiologia. pp. 1–595.

——— 3rd edition, 1983, edited by Marco De Marchi.
