= Romazzotti =

Romazzotti or Romazotti may refer to:

- Gaston Romazzotti (1855–1915), French naval engineer
- French submarine Romazotti (Q114), a Lagrange-class submarine built for the French Navy

== See also ==
- Ramazzotti (disambiguation)
