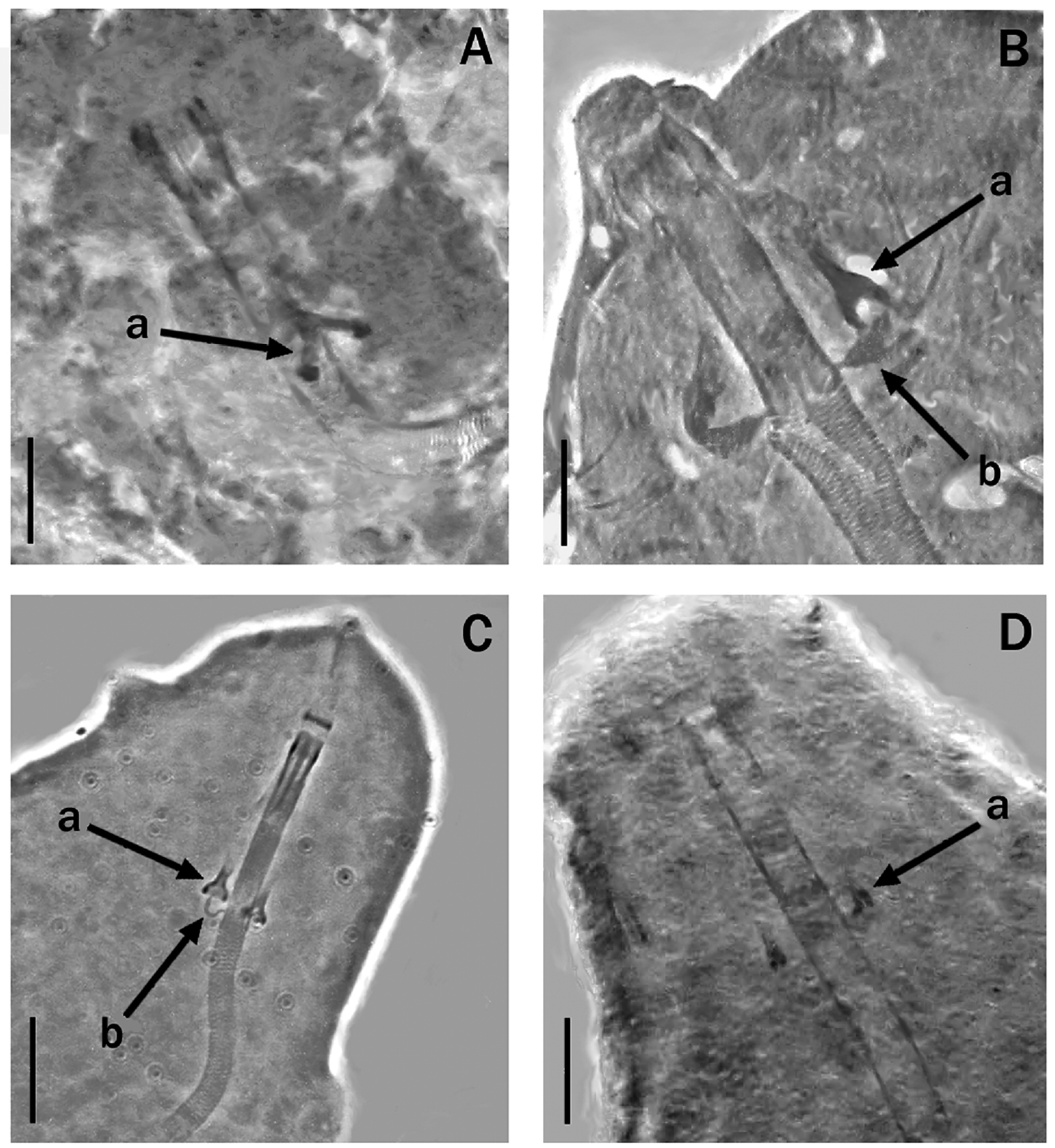
- Itaquasconinae

Scientific classification
- Kingdom: Animalia
- Phylum: Tardigrada
- Class: Eutardigrada
- Order: Parachela
- Family: Hypsibiidae
- Genus: Itaquascon; De Barros, 1939

Species
- See text

= Itaquascon =

Genus of tardigrades

Itaquascon is a genus of tardigrade in the class Eutardigrada.

== Species ==
- Itaquascon biserovi Pilato, Binda and Moncada, 1999
- Itaquascon cambewarrense Pilato, Binda and Claxton, 2002
- Itaquascon enckelli (Mihelcic, 1971)
- Itaquascon globuliferum Abe and Ito, 1994
- Itaquascon mongolicus Kaczmarek, Michalczyk and Wêglarska, 2002
- Itaquascon pawlowskii Wêglarska, 1973
- Itaquascon placophorum Maucci 1973
- Itaquascon simplex (Mihelcic 1971)
- Itaquascon umbellinae De Barros, 1939
- Itaquascon unguiculum Pilato, Binda and Claxton, 2002
