= Diphascon =

Scientific classification
- Domain: Eukaryota
- Kingdom: Animalia
- Phylum: Tardigrada
- Class: Eutardigrada
- Order: Parachela
- Family: Hypsibiidae
- Genus: Diphascon; Plate, 1889

Species
- see text

Genus of tardigrades

Diphascon is a genus of water bear or moss piglet, a tardigrade in the class Eutardigrada.

== Species ==
Subgenus Adropion

- Diphascon carolae Binda & Pilato 1969
- Diphascon clavatum (Bartos, 1935)
- Diphascon gordonense Pilato, Claxton and Horning, 1991
- Diphascon greveni Dastych, 1984
- Diphascon maucci Dastych and McInnes, 1996
- Diphascon modestum Binda, Pilato and Dastych, 1986
- Diphascon montigenum Pilato and Dastych, 1979
- Diphascon onorei Pilato, Binda, Napolitano and Moncada, 2002
- Diphascon prorsirostre Thulin 1928
- Diphascon scoticum Murray, 1905
- Diphascon tricuspidatum Binda and Pilato, 2000
- Diphascon triodon (Maucci, 1996)

Subgenus Diphascon

- Diphascon birklehofi Schuster, 1999
- Diphascon boreale Biserov, 1996
- Diphascon brevipes (Marcus, 1936)
- Diphascon bullatum Murray, 1905
- Diphascon burti Nelson, 1991
- Diphascon chilenense Plate 1889
- Diphascon claxtonae Pilato and Binda, 1998
- Diphascon coniferens (Bartos, 1960)
- Diphascon dastychi Pilato and Binda, 1999
- Diphascon dolmiticum Pilato and Bertolani, 2005
- Diphascon faialense (Fontura & Pilato, 2007)
- Diphascon granifer Greven, 1972
- Diphascon higginsi Binda 1971
- Diphascon humicus Bertolani, Guidetti and Rebecchi, 1993
- Diphascon hydrophilum Pilato, Binda, Bertolani and Lisi, 2005
- Diphascon iharosi Vargha, 1995
- Diphascon iltisi (Schuster and Grigarick, 1965)
- Diphascon langhovdense (Sudzuki 1964)
- Diphascon marcuzzii (Mihelcic, 1971)
- Diphascon mariae (Mihelcic, 1951)
- Diphascon mirabile Dastych, 1984
- Diphascon mitrense Pilato, Binda and Quartieri, 1999
- Diphascon nelsonae Pilato, Binda, Bertolani and Lisi, 2005
- Diphascon nobilei (Binda, 1969)
- Diphascon nodulosum (Ramazzotti, 1957)
- Diphascon oculatum Murray, 1906
- Diphascon ongulense (Morikawa, 1962)
- Diphascon opisthoglyptum Maucci, 1987
- Diphascon patanei Binda and Pilato, 1971
- Diphascon pingue (Marcus, 1936)
- Diphascon pinguiforme Pilato and Binda, 1998
- Diphascon platyungue Pilato, Binda, Bertolani and Lisi, 2005
- Diphascon polare Pilato and Binda, 1999
- Diphascon punctatum (Iharos, 1962)
- Diphascon puniceum (Jennings 1976)
- Diphascon ramazzottii (Robotti, 1970)
- Diphascon recamieri Richters, 1911
- Diphascon rivulare (Mihelcic, 1967)
- Diphascon rugocaudatum (Rodriguez Roda, 1952)
- Diphascon rugosum (Bartos, 1935)
- Diphascon sanae Dastych, Ryan and Watkins, 1990
- Diphascon secchii Bertolani and Rebecchi, 1996
- Diphascon serratum Pilato, Binda, Bertolani and Lisi, 2005
- Diphascon sexbullatum Ito, 1995
- Diphascon speciosum (Mihelcic, 1971)
- Diphascon tenue Thulin, 1928
- Diphascon trachydorsatum (Bartos, 1937)
- Diphascon victoriae Pilato and Binda, 1999
- Diphascon zaniewi Kaczmarek and Michalczyk, 2004
- Subgenus Incertae sedis
- Diphascon elongatum (Mihelcic, 1959)
- Diphascon gerdae (Mihelcic, 1951)
- Diphascon halapiense (Iharos, 1964)
- Diphascon latipes (Mihelcic, 1955)
- Diphascon nonbullatum (Mihelcic, 1951)
- Diphascon stappersi Richters, 1911
