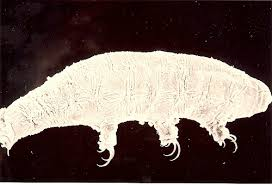
- Doryphoribius smokiensis.

Scientific classification
- Kingdom: Animalia
- Phylum: Tardigrada
- Class: Eutardigrada
- Order: Parachela
- Family: Hypsibiidae
- Genus: Doryphoribius; Pilato, 1969

Species
- see text

= Doryphoribius =

Genus of tardigrades

Doryphoribius is a genus of water bear or moss piglet, a tardigrade in the class Eutardigrada.

== Species ==
Doryphoribius contains the following species:

- Doryphoribius amazzonicus Lisi, 2011
- Doryphoribius barbarae Beasley & Miller, 2012
- Doryphoribius bertolanii Beasley & Pilato, 1987
- Doryphoribius bindae Lisi, 2011
- Doryphoribius cephalogibbosus Rocha, Doma, Gonzales Reyes & Lisi, 2020
- Doryphoribius chetumalensis Pérez-Pech, Anguas-Escalante, Cutz-Pool & Guidetti, 2017
- Doryphoribius dawkinsi Michalczyk & Kaczmarek, 2010
- Doryphoribius doryphorus (Binda & Pilato, 1969)
- Doryphoribius dupliglobulatus Ito, 1995
- Doryphoribius elleneddiei Haefke, Spiers, Miller & Lowman, 2014
- Doryphoribius evelinae (Marcus, 1928)
- Doryphoribius flavus (Iharos, 1966)
- Doryphoribius gibber Beasley & Pilato, 1987
- Doryphoribius huangguoshuensis Wang, Wang & Li, 2007
- Doryphoribius koreanus Moon, Kim & Bertolani, 1994
- Doryphoribius korganovae Biserov, 1994
- Doryphoribius longistipes Bartels, Nelson, Kaczmarek & Michalczyk, 2008
- Doryphoribius maasaimarensis Fontoura, Lisi & Pilato, 2013
- Doryphoribius macrodon Binda, Pilato & Dastych, 1980
- Doryphoribius maranguensis Binda & Pilato, 1995
- Doryphoribius mariae Pilato & Binda, 1990
- Doryphoribius mcinnesae Meng, Sun & X. Li, 2014
- Doryphoribius mexicanus Beasley, Kaczmarek & Michalczyk, 2008
- Doryphoribius minimus Bartels, Nelson, Kaczmarek & Michalczyk, 2008
- Doryphoribius monstruosus (Maucci, 1991)
- Doryphoribius neglectus Pilato & Lisi, 2004
- Doryphoribius niedbalai Zawierucha, Michalczyk & Kaczmarek, 2012
- Doryphoribius picoensis Fontoura, Pilato & Lisi, 2008
- Doryphoribius pilatoi Bertolani, 1983
- Doryphoribius polynettae Biserov, 1988
- Doryphoribius qinlingense X. Li, Su & Yu, 2004
- Doryphoribius quadrituberculatus Kaczmarek & Michalczyk, 2004
- Doryphoribius rosanae Daza, Caicedo, Lisi & Quiroga, 2017
- Doryphoribius smokiensis Bartels, Nelson, Kaczmarek & Michalczyk, 2007
- Doryphoribius solidunguis Lisi, 2011
- Doryphoribius taiwanus X. Li & H. Li, 2008
- Doryphoribius tergumrudis Bartels, Nelson, Kaczmarek & Michalczyk, 2008
- Doryphoribius tessellatus Meyer, 2011
- Doryphoribius turkmenicus Biserov, 1999
- Doryphoribius vietnamensis (Iharos, 1969)
- Doryphoribius zappalai Pilato, 1971
- Doryphoribius zyxiglobus (Horning, Schuster & Grigarick, 1978)
