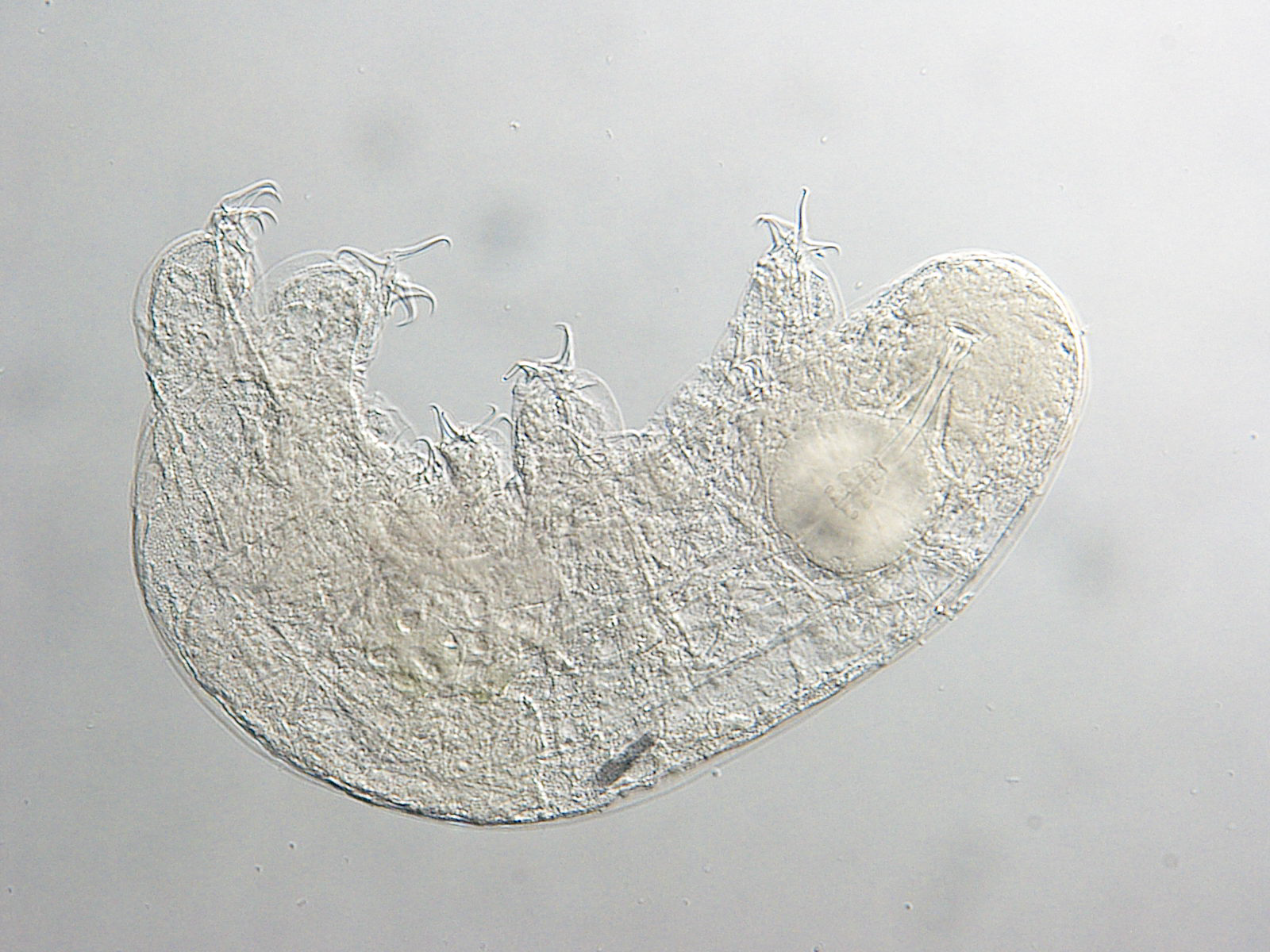
- Isohypibius malawiensis

Scientific classification
- Kingdom: Animalia
- Phylum: Tardigrada
- Class: Eutardigrada
- Order: Parachela
- Family: Hypsibiidae
- Genus: Isohypsibius; Thulin, 1928

Species
- see text

= Isohypsibius =

Genus of tardigrades

Isohypsibius is a genus of water bear or moss piglet, a tardigrade in the class Eutardigrada. The length of an isohypsibius tardigrade ranges from 0.1 millimeters to 1.5 millimeters. In addition to eating algae and plant cells, tardigrades also consume insect larvae and even other tardigrades. They live in a lot of places, like damp wooded areas with moss, lichens, leaf litter, and dirt. These animals can also be found in natural lakes and ponds.

== Species ==
Isohypsibius contains the following species:

- Isohypsibius arbiter Binda, 1980
- Isohypsibius archangajensis Kaczmarek & Michalczyk, 2004
- Isohypsibius arcuatus (Bartoš, 1934)
- Isohypsibius barbarae Pilato & Binda, 2002
- Isohypsibius borkini Tumanov, 2003
- Isohypsibius brulloi Pilato & Pennisi, 1976
- Isohypsibius cambrensis (Morgan, 1976)
- Isohypsibius campbellensis Pilato, 1996
- Isohypsibius ceciliae Pilato & Binda, 1987
- Isohypsibius chiarae Maucci, 1987
- Isohypsibius condorcanquii Kaczmarek, Cytan, Zawierucha, Diduszko & Michalczyk, 2014
- Isohypsibius coulsoni Kaczmarek, Zawierucha, Smykla & Michalczyk, 2012
- Isohypsibius dastychi Pilato, Bertolani & Binda, 1982
- Isohypsibius glazovi Biserov, 1999
- Isohypsibius hydrogogianus Ito & Tagami, 1993
- Isohypsibius jakieli Dastych, 1984
- Isohypsibius karenae Zawierucha, 2013
- Isohypsibius landalti (Iharos, 1966)
- Isohypsibius leithaicus (Iharos, 1966)
- Isohypsibius macrodactylus (Maucci, 1978)
- Isohypsibius marcellinoi Binda & Pilato, 1971
- Isohypsibius occultus Pilato, D'Urso, Sabella & Lisi, 2019
- Isohypsibius palmai Pilato, 1996
- Isohypsibius panovi Tumanov, 2005
- Isohypsibius pseudundulatus (da Cunha & do Nascimento Ribeiro, 1964)
- Isohypsibius reticulatus Pilato, 1973
- Isohypsibius sabellai Pilato, Binda, Napolitano & Moncada, 2004
- Isohypsibius sculptus (Ramazzotti, 1962)
- Isohypsibius taibaiensis Li & Wang, 2005
- Isohypsibius tucumanensis Claps & Rossi, 1984
- Isohypsibius undulatus Thulin, 1928
- Isohypsibius wilsoni (Horning, Schuster & Grigarick, 1978)
