= Ramajendas =

Scientific classification
- Kingdom: Animalia
- Phylum: Tardigrada
- Class: Eutardigrada
- Order: Parachela
- Family: Hypsibiidae
- Genus: Ramajendas; Pilato & Binda, 1991

Species
- see text

Genus of tardigrades

Ramajendas is a genus of water bear or moss piglet, a tardigrade in the class Eutardigrada found in Antarctica.

== Species ==
Ramajendas contains the following species:

- Ramajendas dastychi Kaczmarek, Janko, Smykla & Michalczyk, 2013
- Ramajendas frigidus Pilato and Binda, 1991
- Ramajendas heatwolei Miller, Horning and Dastych, 1995
- Ramajendas renaudi (Ramazzotti, 1972)
