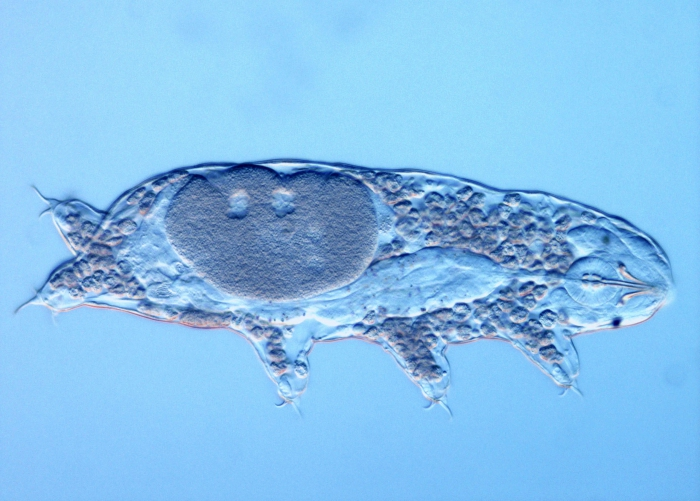

Scientific classification
- Kingdom: Animalia
- Phylum: Tardigrada
- Class: Eutardigrada
- Order: Parachela
- Family: Hypsibiidae
- Genus: Acutuncus; Pilato & Binda, 1997
- Species: A. antarcticus

Binomial name
- Acutuncus antarcticus (Richters, 1904)

= Acutuncus =

Acutuncus antarcticus

Genus of tardigrades

Acutuncus is a genus of tardigrades containing a single species, Acutuncus antarcticus. Tardigrades, which are eight-legged micro-animals, are commonly referred to as water bears or moss piglets and are found all over the world in varying extreme habitats. First discovered in 1904 and originally named Hypsibius antarcticus, Acutuncus antarcticus is the most abundant tardigrade species in Antarctica.

== Morphology ==
The body size of this species varies from 373.8 - 452.9 μm long, having a smooth cuticle and segmented body that appears white or transparent, and four pairs of legs with claws. The intestines may appear green in color, due to a herbivorous diet consisting but not limited to cyanobacteria and green algae. A. antarcticus have relatively large eyes and an anterior mouth.

== Life History ==
Acutuncus antarcticus has a mean lifespan of 69 days, with some individuals living up to a recorded 161 days, and are reproductively successful until death. Similar to other species of tardigrade, A. antarcticus can enter a state of cryptobiosis. Cryptobiosis is a physiological state in which an organism's metabolic activity decreases to a nearly undetectable level as a mechanism to avoid lethal environmental circumstances such as anaerobic conditions, exposure to toxins, desiccation, or freezing. A. antarcticus most commonly undergoes anhydrobiosis in the absence of sufficient water, typically resulting from water freezing. Rehydration occurs when individuals come into contact with water. Both eggs and adult tardigrades can undergo cryptobiosis, and can be reproductively successful after rehydration.

== Reproduction ==
Eggs are laid freely, usually in clusters. They are mostly white and round, but sometimes they are slightly oval shaped. On rare occasions, eggs are laid into the exuviae, which is sloughed skin. The total diameter of the eggs can range from 66 to 103 μm.

The first oviposition event, wherein eggs are laid, is typically observed at an age of 9 to 10 days, however this can range from an age of 6 to 11 days. Clutch size is normally 3 to 6 eggs with a range from 1 to 6 eggs, and there is an average egg development time of 10 days. Clutch size starts with about 2 eggs during the initial reproductive events, and increases quickly to the maximum average clutch size at 30 days. The number of oviposition events varies drastically depending on how long the individual lives; once reproductive age is reached, the interval between oviposition events is 5 to 8 days.

== Habitat and Climate Change ==
Acutuncus antarcticus lives in Antarctica, and South Georgia Island and the South Sandwich Islands. This species is found in terrestrial, marine and freshwater habitats, but are most commonly found in terrestrial habitats living in mosses, lichens, grasses, algae, soil and cyanophytan mats. They are most commonly found in terrestrial habitats due to their anhydrobiosis and cryobiosis abilities, both methods of cryptobiosis. Studies have linked anhydrobiosis with Acutuncus antarcticus ability to withstand freezing temperatures. Cryptobiosis is a reversible metabolic state induced by detrimental environmental factors to help keep the creature alive, which scientists believe involves the synthesis of bioprotectants like selective carbohydrates and proteins and antioxidant enzymes and other free radical scavengers. In addition to these two survival strategies, tardigrades have also been speculated to use specialized DNA repair mechanisms and osmoregulations to help them survive extreme conditions. These include: extreme tolerance to environmental stress, tolerance to high levels of ionizing radiation, tolerance to extreme changes in external salinity and extremely low temperatures by supercooling to below -20 degrees Celsius. This extreme survival ability is a common trait among micrometazoons like nematodes, tardigrades, and rotifers. One outstanding case in 2015 demonstrated a frozen moss sample from 1983 that contained tardigrades. From this sample, 2 tardigrades and 1 egg survived, despite being placed in -20 degrees Celsius for 30.5 years. These surviving tardigrades and tardigrade eggs were Acutuncus antarcticus, giving them the longest record of survival for tardigrades.

It is speculated that climate change could affect the Acutuncus antarcticus. Experimentation with pan-Antarctic Acutuncus antarcticus and exposure to UV radiation, extreme temperatures, and desiccation show how the species responds to these factors. Hydrated and desiccated tagridades were able to tolerate UV radiation, with desiccated targridades being the most successful in tolerating UV radiation. The survivorship of both groups were negatively affected when exposed to a combination of extreme temperature and UV radiation, with hydrated targridades being more successful in tolerating the temperature and UV radiation changes. It was also found that UV radiation has an effect on the reproductive abilities of both groups; the targridades exposed to UV radiation had an increase in egg reabsorption and teratological events. It was concluded that climate change will negatively affect Acutuncus antarcticus. Since climate change will occur gradually, unlike in the experimental conditions, Acutuncus antarcticus may have a better chance of adapting to the changes caused by climate change.
