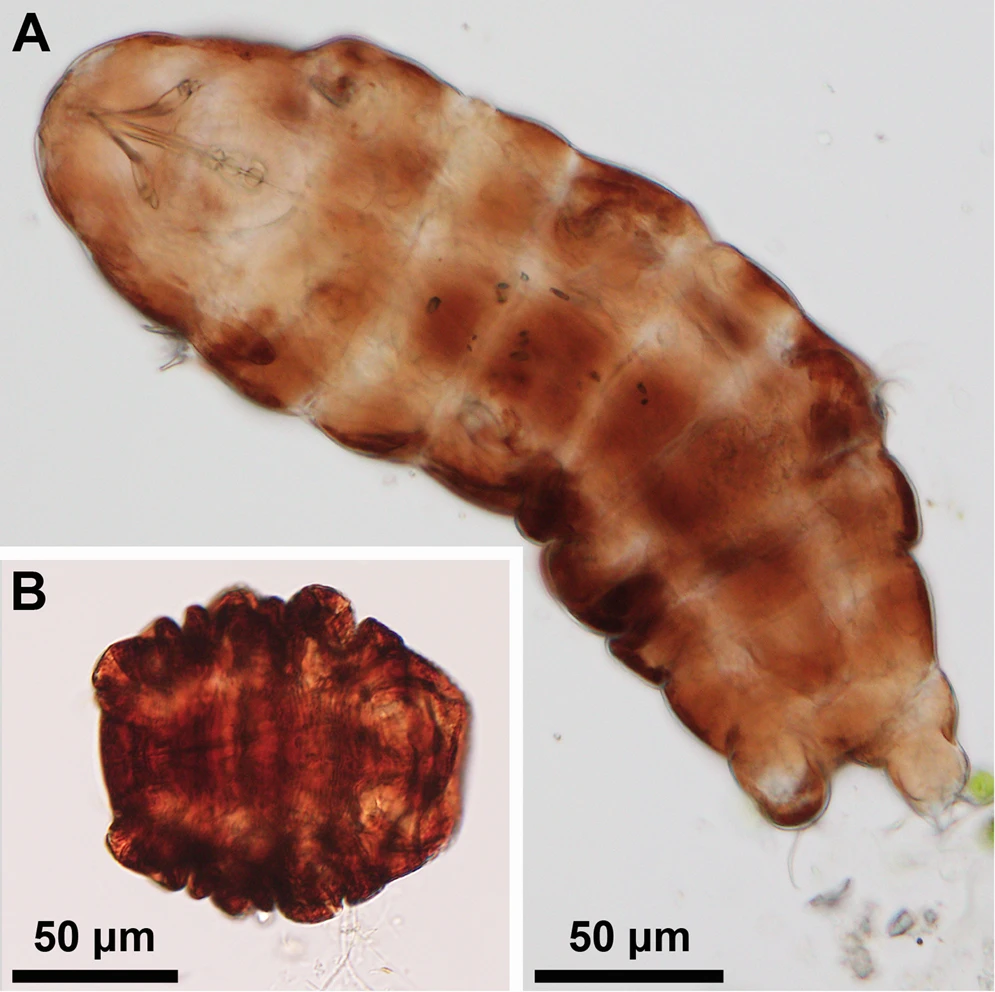
- Light micrographs of Ramazzottius varieornatus in its active state (A) and the cryptobiotic tun state (B)

Scientific classification
- Kingdom: Animalia
- Phylum: Tardigrada
- Class: Eutardigrada
- Order: Parachela
- Family: Hypsibiidae
- Genus: Ramazzottius; Binda and Pilato, 1987

Species
- see text

= Ramazzottius =

Genus of tardigrades

Ramazzottius is a genus of water bear or moss piglet, a tardigrade in the class Eutardigrada, named after the Italian zoologist Giuseppe Ramazzotti.

Ramazzottius varieornatus (see image) is a terrestrial invertebrate that is extroardinarily tolerant of extreme conditions such as irradiation, chemicals, dehydration and high pressure. This tolerance is linked to the presence of the damage suppressor protein (Dsup) that binds to nucleosomes providing tolerance to DNA damage, such as that caused by ionizing radiation or hydroxyl radicals.

== Species ==
Ramazzottius contains the following species:

- Ramazzottius affinis Bertolani, Guidetti & Rebecchi, 1994
- Ramazzottius agannae Dastych, 2011
- Ramazzottius andreevi Biserov, 1998
- Ramazzottius anomalus (Ramazzotti, 1962)
- Ramazzottius baumanni (Ramazzotti, 1962)
- Ramazzottius belubellus Bartels, Nelson, Kaczmarek & Michalczyk, 2011
- Ramazzottius bunikowskae Kaczmarek, Michalczyk & Diduszko, 2006
- Ramazzottius caucasicus Biserov, 1998
- Ramazzottius conifer (Mihelčič, 1938)
- Ramazzottius horningi Binda & Pilato, 1994
- Ramazzottius kretschmanni Guidetti, Cesari, Giovannini, Ebel, Förschler & Schill, 2022
- Ramazzottius libycus Pilato, D'Urso & Lisi, 2013
- Ramazzottius littoreus Fontoura, Rubal & Veiga, 2017
- Ramazzottius montivagus (Dastych, 1983)
- Ramazzottius nivalis Dastych, 2006
- Ramazzottius oberhaeuseri (Doyère, 1840)
- Ramazzottius rupeus Biserov, 1999
- Ramazzottius sabatiniae Guidetti, Massa, Bertolani, Rebecchi & Cesari, 2019
- Ramazzottius saltensis (Claps & Rossi, 1984)
- Ramazzottius semisculptus Pilato & Rebecchi, 1992
- Ramazzottius subanomalus (Biserov, 1985)
- Ramazzottius szeptycki (Dastych, 1980)
- Ramazzottius theroni Dastych, 1993
- Ramazzottius thulini (Pilato, 1970)
- Ramazzottius tribulosus Bertolani & Rebecchi, 1988
- Ramazzottius valaamis Biserov & Tumanov, 1993
- Ramazzottius varieornatus Bertolani & Kinchin, 1993
