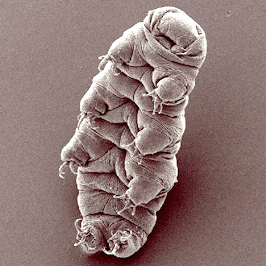
- Hypsibius dujardini

Scientific classification
- Kingdom: Animalia
- Phylum: Tardigrada
- Class: Eutardigrada
- Order: Parachela
- Family: Hypsibiidae; Pilato, 1969

Subfamilies and genera
- See text

= Hypsibiidae =

Family of tardigrades

The Hypsibiidae are a family of water bears or moss piglets, tardigrades in the class Eutardigrada.

== Subfamilies and genera ==
Hypsibiidae contains the following subfamilies and genera:

- Subfamily Diphasconinae
  - Diphascon
  - Kararehius
- Subfamily Hypsibiinae
  - Borealibius
  - Cryobiotus
  - Hypsibius
- Subfamily Itaquasconinae
  - Adropion
  - Astatumen
  - Bindius
  - Guidettion
  - Insulobius
  - Itaquascon
  - Meplitumen
  - Mesocrista
  - Parascon
  - Platicrista
  - Raribius
  - Sarascon
- Subfamily Pilatobiinae
  - Pilatobius

The following genera are not assigned to any subfamilies:

- Acutuncus
- Fujiscon
- Kopakaius
- Mixibius
- Notahypsibius
