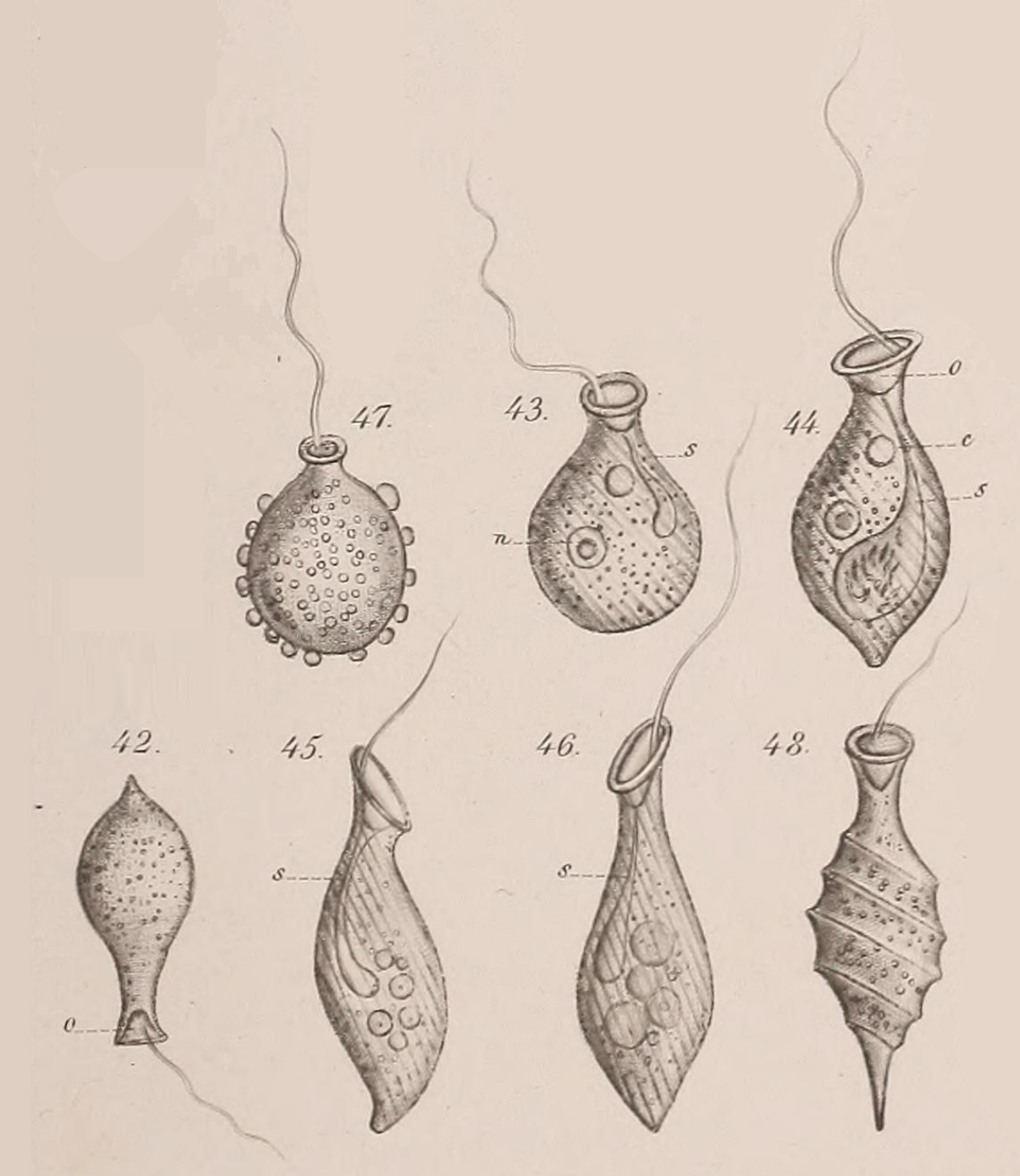
- The first illustrations of Urceolus cyclostomus by Friedrich Stein (1878)

Scientific classification
- Domain: Eukaryota
- Clade: Discoba
- Phylum: Euglenozoa
- Class: Euglenida
- Order: Peranemida
- Family: Peranemidae
- Genus: Urceolus
- Species: U. cyclostomus

Binomial name
- Urceolus cyclostomus (Stein, 1878) Mereschkowsky, 1881

Synonyms
- Phialonema cyclostomum Stein, 1878

= Urceolus cyclostomus =

Species of flagellate

Urceolus cyclostomus is a species of heterotrophic flagellates. It was initially described by Friedrich Stein in 1878 as Phialonema cyclostomum, from an unknown location. Due to its morphological similarities to Urceolus alenizini, the author of the latter, Konstantin Mereschkowsky, transferred it to the genus Urceolus in 1881. Like other species of the genus, its cells have a neck and a wide aperture to a canal that hosts a single flagellum and its feeding apparatus. It is distinguished from other species by a significantly more rigid cell shape, among other traits. It can be found in the bottom sediment of freshwater and brackish water bodies, as a consumer of algae.

== Description ==
Urceolus cyclostomus is a species of flagellate, a single-celled protist that exhibits an emergent flagellum for movement. Members of the genus Urceolus are distinguished by the presence of a 'neck' at the anterior end of their oval-shaped cell, followed by a wide aperture or 'mouth' into a deep canal where the feeding groove and the flagellum originate. In addition, like other euglenids, the cell surface or pellicle is spiral-striped. In particular, U. cyclostomus is distinguished from other species of the genus by its more or less rigid and regular body shape, a less developed 'ingestive organelle' or feeding apparatus, and a more conspicuous 'hatching' (i.e. more pronounced stripes) of the pellicle. The posterior end of the cell is narrow, as is common in other euglenids. The cells are ovate, measuring 14–30 μm long and 4–18 μm wide. The cells move by crawling through the substrate, with the posterior end raised. The flagellum is around 1.5 times longer than the cell itself, 40–50 μm.

== Distribution and habitat ==
Urceolus cyclostomus inhabits the bottom sediment of freshwater bodies with a wide distribution. It has been recorded in bogs of the Central Russian forest-steppe region and numerous ponds in the Czech Republic, where it feeds on epipelic cyanobacteria and other kinds of algae. It is also present in brackish waters, such as salt marshes and intertidal sand of England.

== Taxonomy ==
The species Urceolus cyclostomus was initially described by German zoologist Friedrich Stein in his 1878 book Der Organismus der Infusionthiere. He named the species as Phialonema cyclostomum, without specifying the location in which it was discovered. He described this new genus and species through a series of illustrations. Later, Russian biologist Konstantin Mereschkowsky compared Stein's illustrations of P. cyclostomum with the description of his own genus and species, Urceolus alenizini, which he published the previous year in 1877. Mereschkowsky noticed the extreme similarities, particularly the 'neck' with a wide aperture where the flagellum originates. In 1881, he transferred this new species to Urceolus under the name of U. cyclostomus, rendering Phialonema a junior synonym of his genus.
