= Urceolus cornutus =

Scientific classification
- Domain: Eukaryota
- Phylum: Euglenozoa
- Class: Euglenida
- Order: Peranemida
- Family: Peranemidae
- Genus: Urceolus
- Species: U. cornutus

Binomial name
- Urceolus cornutus Larsen & Patterson, 1990

Species of flagellate

Urceolus cornutus is a species of heterotrophic flagellates present in marine environments. Described in 1990 by Jacob Larsen and David Patterson from sediment samples off the coast of Fiji, it is distinguished from other species by very fine and compact pellicle stripes that follow an S-helix shape, and a collar with a regular or symmetrical outline.

== Description ==
Urceolus cornutus is a species of flagellate, a unicellular eukaryote or protist that moves with one emergent flagellum for movement, present in the anterior region of the cell. Like other species of the genus Urceolus, the flagellum and a feeding groove are located in a canal with an anterior neck-like opening surrounded by a neck-like aperture. No second flagellum has been observed, but is probably located within the canal. In particular, U. cornutus cells are broadly sack-shaped, 27–50 μm long and 10–20 μm wide. Their neck is 12–20 μm in diameter, with a regular outline. The flagellum is equal in length or slightly longer than the cell. The pellicle stripes, characteristic of euglenids, are delicate and closely spaced, in the shape of an S-helix and reaching into the collar. The feeding apparatus or ingestion organelle, located at the base of the canal, is well-developed and is composed of two microtubular rods. The canal itself opens subapically. The nucleus is located at the posterior end of the cell.

== Distribution and habitat ==
Urceolus cornutus is a phagotrophic protist inhabiting marine sediment, where it feeds on microalgae. It was discovered in Laucala Bay, Fiji, but has also been recorded in other marine sites, such as the coast of Sydney, Australia, the Oslofjord in Norway, and off the coast of Cantabria, Spain.

== Taxonomy ==
The species Urceolus cornutus was described by protistologists Jacob Larsen and David Patterson in a 1990 study of flagellates from tropical marine sediments, published in the Journal of Natural History. It was found at Laucala Bay, Fiji.
