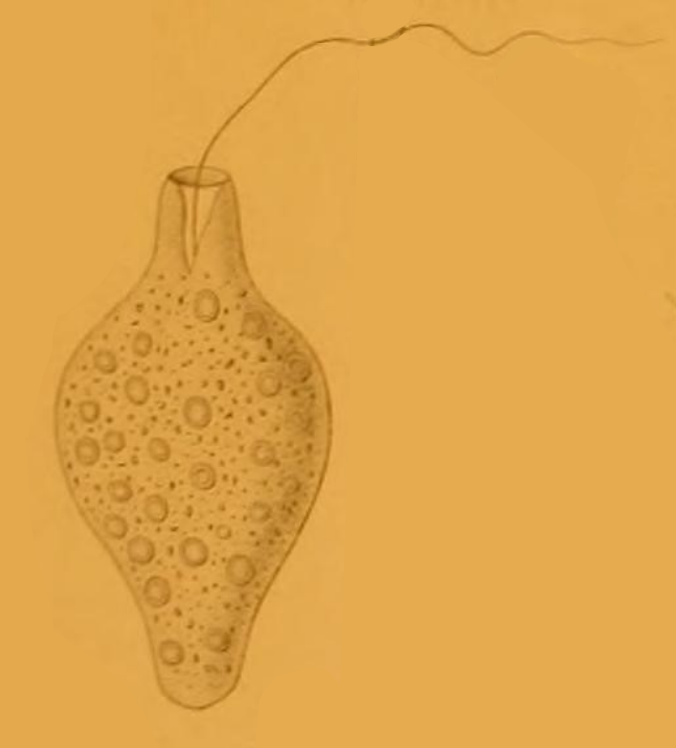
- Illustration of U. alenizini by Mereschkowsky (1879)

Scientific classification
- Domain: Eukaryota
- Supergroup: Discoba
- Phylum: Euglenozoa
- Class: Euglenida
- Order: Peranemida
- Family: Peranemidae
- Genus: Urceolus; Mereschkowsky 1877 ["1879"] (Note: Some online resources, such as AlgaeBase, attribute the original description of Urceolus to an 1879 article in the German journal Archiv für Mikroskopische Anatomie. However, according to Mereschkowsky himself and posterior articles, this is a translation of an article published two years earlier in a Russian journal. This explains the priority of Urceolus over Phialonema, a junior synonym described in 1878.)

Type species
- Urceolus alenizini Mereschkowsky 1877 ["1879"]

Species
- U. alenizini; U. cornutus; U. costatus; U. cristatus; U. cyclostomus; U. gloeochlamys; U. pascheri; U. sabulosus

Synonyms
- Phialonema Stein 1878; Urceolopsis Stokes 1887

= Urceolus =

Genus of flagellates

Urceolus (from Latin urceolus 'flask', 'pitcher') is a genus of heterotrophic flagellates belonging to the Euglenozoa, a phylum of single-celled eukaryotes or protists. Described by Russian biologist Konstantin Mereschkowsky in 1877, its type species is Urceolus alenizini. Species of this genus are characterized by deformable flask-shaped cells that exhibit at least one flagellum that is active at the tip, arising from a neck-like structure that also hosts the feeding apparatus. They are found in a variety of water body sediments across the globe. According to evolutionary studies, Urceolus belongs to a group of Euglenozoa known as peranemids, closely related to the euglenophyte algae.

== Description ==
Urceolus species are single-celled eukaryotes or protists. Their cells are sack-shaped, narrow at the anterior end and expanded at the posterior end. The cells exhibit flexibility and squirming movements, more vigorous in some species. Like other phagotrophic protists, they present an organelle for ingestion known as a 'feeding apparatus', an arrangement of microtubules beneath a concave portion of the cell membrane used for ingesting prey through phagocytosis. Their cell body is deformable, but can be distinguished from other euglenids by a flared collar or 'neck' in the anterior region, which hosts a canal where the feeding apparatus and the flagellum are located. very small in some species. They have one emergent flagellum, but it is mostly active only at the tip. A rudimentary second flagellum is present in U. cyclostomus.

Urceolus species gliding across a microscope slide

== Ecology and distribution ==
Urceolus species are heterotrophic, and feed on algae through phagocytosis. They have been reported in marine and freshwater sediments of various locations, both temperate and tropical, such as the Norwegian Oslofjord, lake Tämnaren in Sweden, the Danish portion of the Wadden Sea, numerous ponds and wetlands in Czech Republic and Russia, tropical Australia, the Juma River in China, and Fiji. Like most peranemids, they live on the bottom mud of various water bodies, and only occasionally find their way into the water column, drifting among the plankton.

== Evolution ==
Urceolus is a genus of phagotrophic flagellates belonging to the Euglenida, a highly diverse group that also contains the phototrophic euglenophyte algae. One trait that has been used to investigate the evolution from heterotrophic euglenids towards their phototrophic counterpart is the number of strips within the feeding canal. In Urceolus cyclostomus, the canal has a number of strips equivalent to the number of strips along the entire exterior of the cell (around 40). In contrast, more 'basal' heterotrophic euglenids such as Dinema have half as many strips in the canal as the cell exterior (around 20). This is known as the 'second strip duplication event', an evolutionary innovation that presumably led to more plastic movement (metaboly) and an increase in cell size for a clade uniting Urceolus, Peranema and the phototrophic euglenophytes, known as Spirocuta.

Further morphological traits seen in Urceolus, such as a swelling around the flagellum that resembles a photoreceptor, and a stigma that resembles the eyespot of euglenophyte algae, led to the hypothesis that Urceolus was the sister group of the euglenophytes. Phylogenetic analyses through DNA sequences place all peranemids (e.g., Urceolus, Peranema and others) as a whole as the sister group to euglenophytes, rather than any particular genus. The following cladogram, based on a study published in 2021, represents these findings:

- Euglenida
  - - - - Spirocuta
          - - Euglenophyceae
            - Peranemidae
              - - - Urceolus
                  - Chasmostoma
                - - "Jenningsia"
                  - Peranema
              - "Jenningsia"
          - Anisonemia
        - Olkasia
      - - Liburna
        - Entosiphon
    - Alistosa
  - Petalomonadida

== Systematics ==
=== Taxonomic history ===
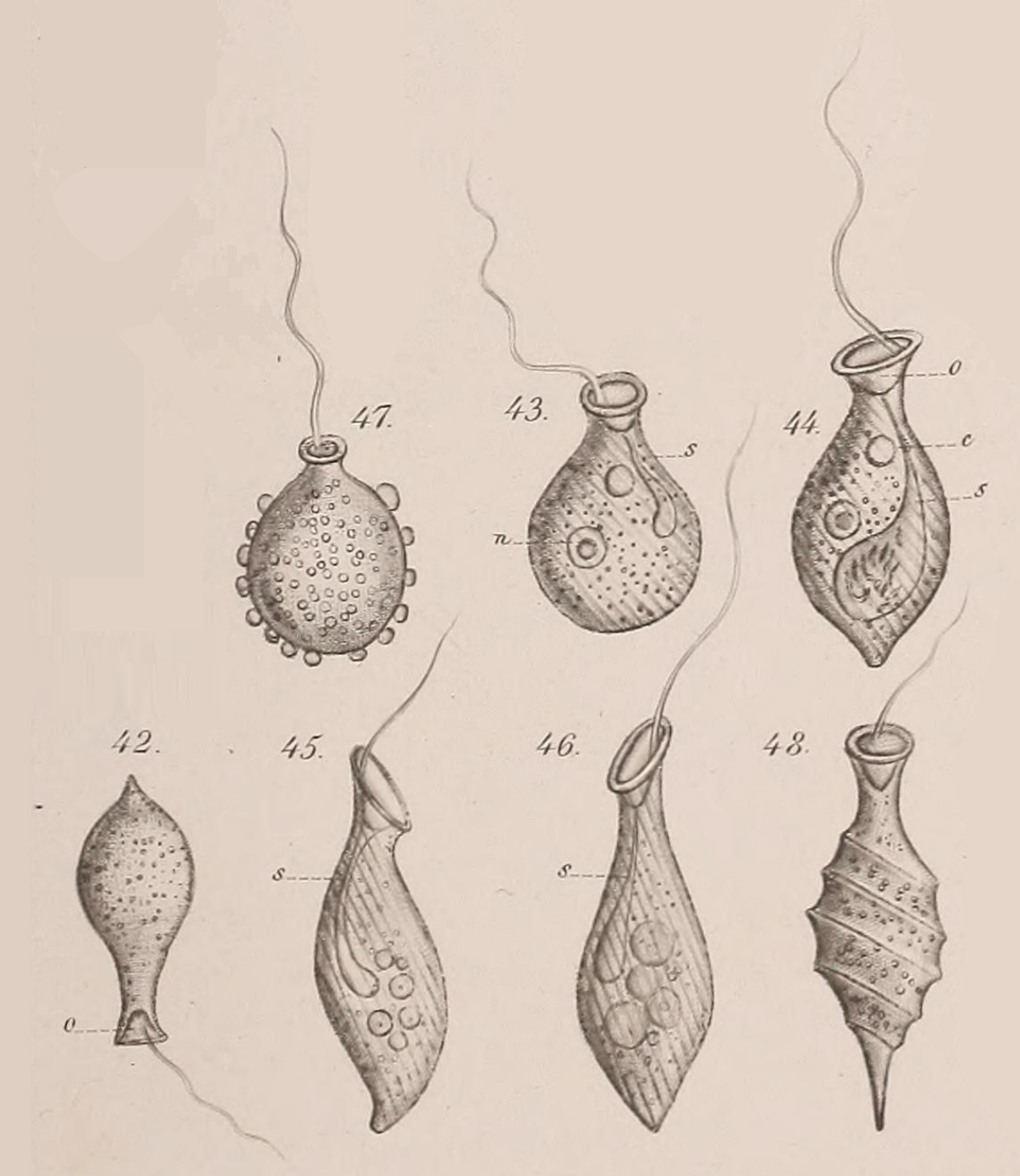
The illustrations drawn by Friedrich Stein to describe Phialonema cyclostomum (1878)

The genus Urceolus was first described by Russian biologist Konstantin Mereschkowsky in 1877, in a memoir on the protozoa of the north of Russia. He described it to accommodate a rare species of flagellate that he discovered that same year in the White Sea, near the Solovetsky Monastery, named U. alenizini. He characterized this new genus by the unique urn or pitcher-shaped cells, and accordingly named it urceolus meaning 'pitcher' in Latin. The next year, German zoologist Friderich Stein described a new flagellate by the name of Phialonema cyclostomum, the first species of its genus. Upon comparing the two species, Mereschkowsky concluded that the appearance and description of P. cyclostomum matched his description of Urceolus, and he transferred it to his genus as U. cyclostomus. Consequently, Phialonema became a junior synonym of Urceolus in 1881.

In 1887, American protozoologist Alfred Cheatham Stokes described the genus Urceolopsis to accommodate the species U. sabulosus. This genus is essentially equal in appearance to Urceolus, with the only difference being that the cell surface is covered in adherent sand grains. It was later synonimised to Urceolus for that reason.

Urceolus and other colorless, non-photosynthetic flexible flagellates such as Heteronema, Peranema and Anisonema were initially lumped together in the family Peranemidae, while similar but phototrophic, green-coloured algae such as Euglena composed the family Euglenidae. Both families belong to the Euglenida, one of the major groups within the phylum Euglenozoa, a basal group of eukaryotes. The taxonomic status of Peranemidae has changed through the years: first classified in the paraphyletic order Heteronematales, it later became the sole family of the order Peranemida, regarded as the closest relatives of the photosynthetic euglenids. Many colorless euglenids were transferred from Peranemidae to other groups, but Urceolus is one of the few genera that remains in the family.

=== Classification ===
Urceolus contains the following species:

- Urceolus alenizini Mereschkowsky 1877 ["1879"]
- Urceolus cornutus Larsen & Patterson 1990
- Urceolus costatus Stein ex Lemmermann 1910
- Urceolus cristatus Larsen & Patterson 1990
- Urceolus cyclostomus (Stein 1878) Mereschkowsky 1881
  = Phialonema cyclostomum Stein 1878
- Urceolus gloeochlamys Skuja 1956
- Urceolus pascheri Skvortzow 1924
  = U. gobii Skvortzow 1924
  = U. ovatus Roskin 1931 nom. illeg.
- Urceolus sabulosus (Stokes 1887) Larsen & Patterson 1990
  = Urceolopsis sabulosa Stokes 1887
  = Urceolus ovatus Möbius 1888 nom. illeg.

Several authors note that there is considerable ambiguity in the identification of Urceolus species, because most original descriptions are inadequate and confident identification is not always possible. In addition, detail is often obscured by adhering particles of detritus.
