= Hokulea (protist) =

Scientific classification
- Domain: Eukaryota
- Supergroup: Discoba
- Phylum: Euglenozoa
- Class: Euglenida
- Clade: Alistosa
- Genus: Hokulea; Ruiz et al. 2026

Type species
- Hokulea waialensis Ruiz et al. 2026

Species
- H. waialensis; H. pusilla

Genus of alistosan euglenids

Hokulea is a genus of alistosan euglenids. Its members are heterotrophic freshwater biflagellates.

== Characteristics ==
Hokulea is a free living, rigid, biflagellated freshwater heterotrophic euglenid with an oblong cell shape, slow gliding speed and 10 slightly helical pellicle strips that only some can be seen in light microscopes. A hook-shaped feeding apparatus and ventrally slightly flattened cell body are present.

== Etymology ==
The name "Hokulea" comes from the traditional Polynesian boat named "Hōkulea".

== Taxonomy ==
The genus Hokulea was described in 2026 and assigned to the group Alistosa of euglenids. A new species Hokulea waialensis was described along with it. Later, the species Ploeotia pusilla was recombined as Hokulea pusilla and added to this genus because of a phylogenetic analysis.

== Phylogeny ==
The results of two analyses in 2026. In the first analysis, Alistosa was recovered, in the second analysis, it was not:

- Alistosa
  - - Ploeotia
    - Keelungia
  - - - Decastava
      - Lentomonas
    - Hokulea

- - - Decastava
    - - Lentomonas
      - Hokulea
  - - Hemiolia
    - Keelungia
- - Ploeotia
  - Serpenomonas
