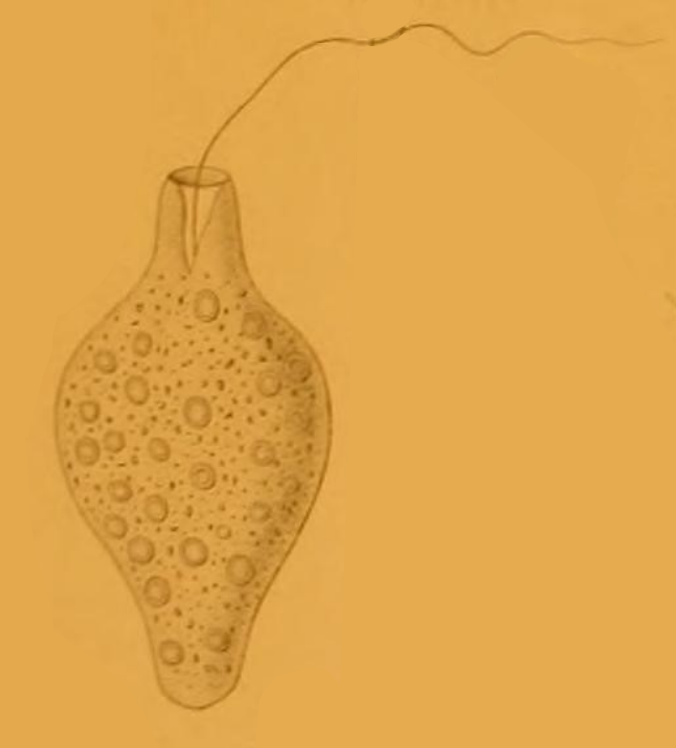
- Illustration of U. alenizini by Mereschkowsky (1879)

Scientific classification
- Domain: Eukaryota
- Clade: Discoba
- Phylum: Euglenozoa
- Class: Euglenida
- Order: Peranemida
- Family: Peranemidae
- Genus: Urceolus
- Species: U. alenizini

Binomial name
- Urceolus alenizini Mereschkowsky, 1877

= Urceolus alenizini =

Species of flagellate

Urceolus alenizini (alternatively spelt alenitzini or alenizinii) is a species of flagellates. It was described by Konstantin Mereschkowsky in 1877 as the type species of the genus Urceolus. It is a rare species only recorded by its author once in the White Sea, in northern Russia. It is distinguished by other members of the genus by the lack of spiral stripes in its cell surface.

== Description ==
Urceolus alenizini is a species of flagellates, single-celled protists that have flagella for movement. Members of the genus Urceolus are distinguished by the presence of a 'neck' at the anterior end of their oval-shaped cell, followed by a wide aperture or 'mouth' into a deep canal where the feeding groove and the flagellum originate. Like other euglenids, their pellicle is composed of stripes that run spirally along the surface. However, this particular species, U. alenizini, is distinguished from other species of the genus because it lacks said spiralling stripes, and presents a smooth cell surface instead. In addition, it has a cylindrical neck with margins abruptly truncated, not turned outward as in other species such as U. cyclostomus. The author of the species, Konstantin Mereschkowsky, measured the cell size as 0.039 in length, and 0.024 at the greatest width, without using any symbol of the metric system.

== Taxonomy ==
The species Urceolus alenizini was described by Russian biologist Konstantin Mereschkowsky, in a memoir on the protozoa found in northern Russia published in 1877, later translated into German in 1879. It was described from a rare flagellate seen only once by Mereschkowsky in the White Sea, near the Solovetsky Monastery, distinguished by the unique neck-shaped anterior end of the cell. As the first species of the genus Urceolus, it became its type species.

The generic name Urceolus, from Latin urceolus 'pitcher', references the flask or pitcher-shaped cells. The specific epithet alenizini is named in honour of an individual named Woldemar Alenizin, referred by Mereschkowsky as "highly respected". In later publications and electronic sources such as AlgaeBase, the epithet appears written as alenitzini or alenizinii instead.
