= Alan Frank Beardon =

British mathematician (born 1940)

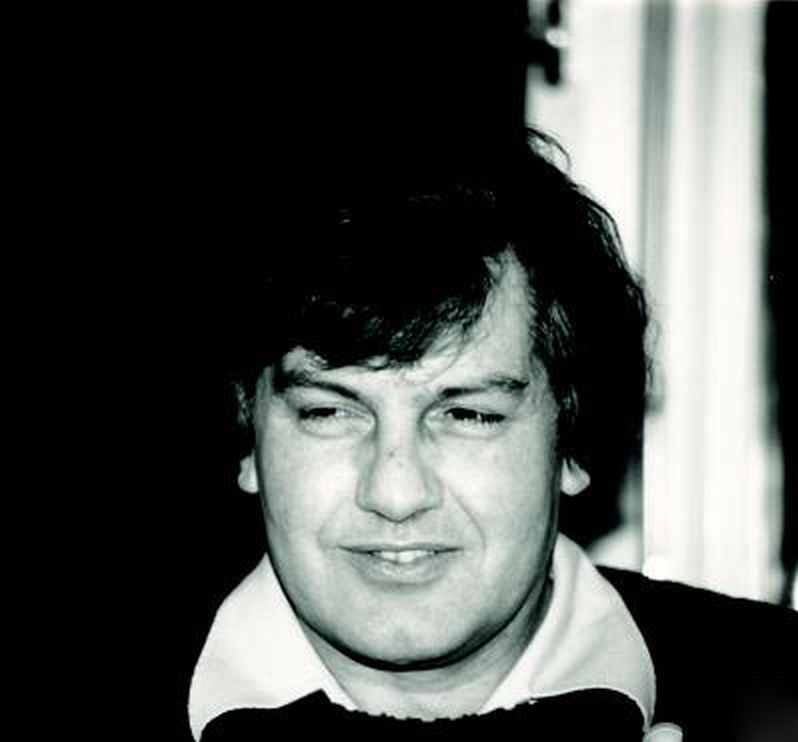
- Alan Beardon at Oberwolfach, 1988
- Born: April 16, 1940 (age 86); United Kingdom
- Education: Imperial College London
- Awards: Lester R. Ford Award (1997); G. de B. Robinson Award (2017)
- Scientific career
- Fields: Algebraic Geometry
- Workplaces: University of Cambridge
- Thesis: On the Hausdorff dimension of certain sets (PhD, 1964)
- Doctoral advisor: Walter Kurt Hayman
- Doctoral students: Samuel James Patterson

Alan Frank Beardon (born April 16, 1940) is a British mathematician.

== Education and career ==
Beardon obtained his doctorate at Imperial College London in 1964, supervised by Walter Hayman. In 1970 he was appointed as a lecturer in the Department of Pure Mathematics and Mathematical Statistics at the University of Cambridge, with promotions to readership and professorship until his retirement in 2007. He is an emeritus fellow of St. Catharine's College, Cambridge.

== Works ==
- Creative Mathematics - The Gateway to Research, Cambridge University Press, 2009
- Algebra and Geometry, Cambridge University Press, 2005
- Limits: A New Approach to Real Analysis, Undergraduate Texts in Mathematics, Springer Verlag, 1997
- The geometry of discrete groups, Graduate Texts in Mathematics, Springer Verlag, 1983, 1995
- Iteration of rational functions. Complex analytical dynamical systems, Graduate Texts in Mathematics, Springer Verlag, 1991
- A Primer on Riemann Surfaces, Cambridge University Press, 1984
- Complex analysis: the argument principle in analysis and topology, Wiley, 1979
