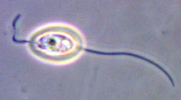
- Light micrograph of Ploeotia showing anterior (left) and posterior (right) flagella

Scientific classification
- Domain: Eukaryota
- Clade: Discoba
- Phylum: Euglenozoa
- Class: Euglenida
- Clade: Alistosa
- Family: Ploeotiidae
- Genus: Ploeotia; Dujardin, 1841

Type species
- Ploeotia vitrea Dujardin, 1841

= Ploeotia =

Genus of flagellates

Ploeotia is a genus of heterotrophic flagellates belonging to the Euglenida, a diverse group of flagellated protists in the phylum Euglenozoa. Species of Ploeotia are composed of rigid cells exhibiting two flagella. The genus was described by Félix Dujardin in 1841.

== Description ==
Ploeotia is a genus of flagellates, single-celled eukaryotes or protists that move using flagella. They have two flagella of different lengths. Like all euglenids, cells of Ploeotia have a pellicle underneath the cell membrane composed of spiralling protein stripes. In some euglenids, such as euglenophytes and peranemids, the number of stripes is high enough that the cells are very flexible and can exhibit a unique movement knowwn as metaboly. In more basal euglenids, such as petalomonads and ploeotids (including Ploeotia), the number of stripes is low (10 or 12), which makes the cells significantly more rigid.

== Taxonomic history ==
The genus Ploeotia was described by French protozoologist Dujardin in his 1841 work Histoire naturelle des zoophytes. In 2016, American protozoologist Thomas Cavalier-Smith created the family Ploeotiidae to include only Ploeotia, within the order Ploeotiida and class Ploeotarea which also included the genus Lentomonas. At the same time, the closely related genus Serpenomonas was transferred into another monotypic family, Serpenomonadidae, within a completely different class.

All of these higher taxa were reinterpreted in 2019, when phylogenetic analyses demonstrated that Ploeotia and Serpenomonas were more closely related to each other than to the rest of euglenids, including Lentomonas. Consequently, the class Ploeotarea and order Ploeotiida were deemed polyphyletic, and the family Ploeotiidae was modified to include Ploeotia and Serpenomonas. Both genera belong to a basal clade of euglenids known as Alistosa, along with other genera such as Lentomonas, Decastava and Keelungia. The following cladogram shows the phylogenetic placement of Ploeotia within euglenids:

- Euglenida
  - - - - Spirocuta
          - - Euglenophyceae
            - Peranemidae
          - Anisonemea
        - - Karavia
            - Hemiolia
            - Liburna
          - Gaulosia
      - Entosiphon
    - - Alistosa
        - - - Lentomonas
            - Decastava
          - Keelungia
        - - Ploeotiidae
            - Serpenomonas
            - Ploeotia
  - Petalomonadida
