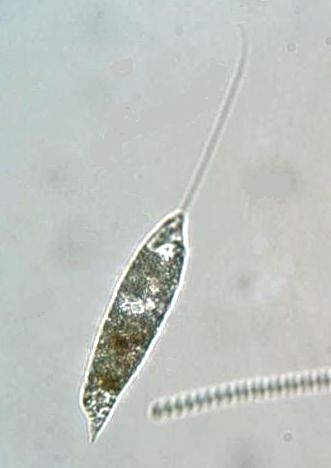
- Peranema sp.

Scientific classification
- Domain: Eukaryota
- Supergroup: Discoba
- Phylum: Euglenozoa
- Class: Euglenida
- Order: Peranemida
- Family: Peranemidae
- Genus: Peranema; Dujardin, 1841

Species
- See text

= Peranema =

Genus of protozoans

Peranema is a genus of free-living phagotrophic euglenids (Euglenida; Euglenozoa; Excavata). There are more than 20 nominal species, varying in size between 8 and 200 micrometers. Peranema cells are gliding flagellates found in freshwater lakes, ponds and ditches, and are often abundant at the bottom of stagnant pools rich in decaying organic material. Although they belong to the class Euglenoidea, and are morphologically similar to the green Euglena, Peranema have no chloroplasts, and do not conduct autotrophy. Instead, they capture live prey, such as yeast, bacteria and other flagellates, consuming them with the help of a rigid feeding apparatus called a "rod-organ." Unlike the green euglenids, they lack both an eyespot (stigma), and the paraflagellar body (photoreceptor) that is normally coupled with that organelle. However, while Peranema lack a localized photoreceptor, they do possess the light-sensitive protein rhodopsin, and respond to changes in light with a characteristic "curling behaviour."

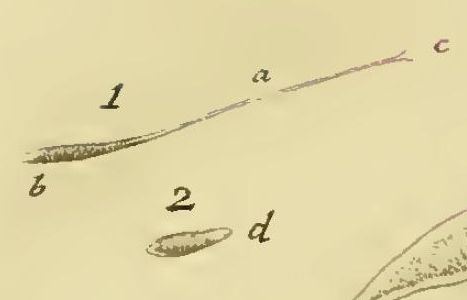
O.F. Müller's Vibrio strictus

The earliest record of a Peranema is in O.F. Müller's Animalcula Infusoria of 1786, which describes an "elongated linear" creature, "stretched out at the front." Müller named it Vibrio strictus, placing it among the "long-necked" infusoria, along with Lacrymaria olor and Dileptus. The species Peranema trichophorum was seen and described in 1838 by C.G. Ehrenberg, who, like Müller before him, took the flagellum for a necklike extension of the body, and placed it in the ciliate genus Trachelius. Peranema was correctly identified as a flagellate by Félix Dujardin, who created the genus in 1842, giving it the name Pyronema, for its pyriform (pear-shaped) body. However, because that name had already been applied to a genus of fungi, he amended the genus to Peranema, formed from the Greek πέρα (a leather purse or sack) and νήμα (a thread). Unfortunately, this name had also been claimed earlier, for a genus of ferns first collected in Nepal. As a result, botanists, following the International Code of Botanical Nomenclature, customarily refer to the protist Peranema as Pseudoperanema; whereas protozoologists, following the International Code of Zoological Nomenclature, have continued to call the genus by the name Dujardin gave it.

== Appearance and characteristics ==
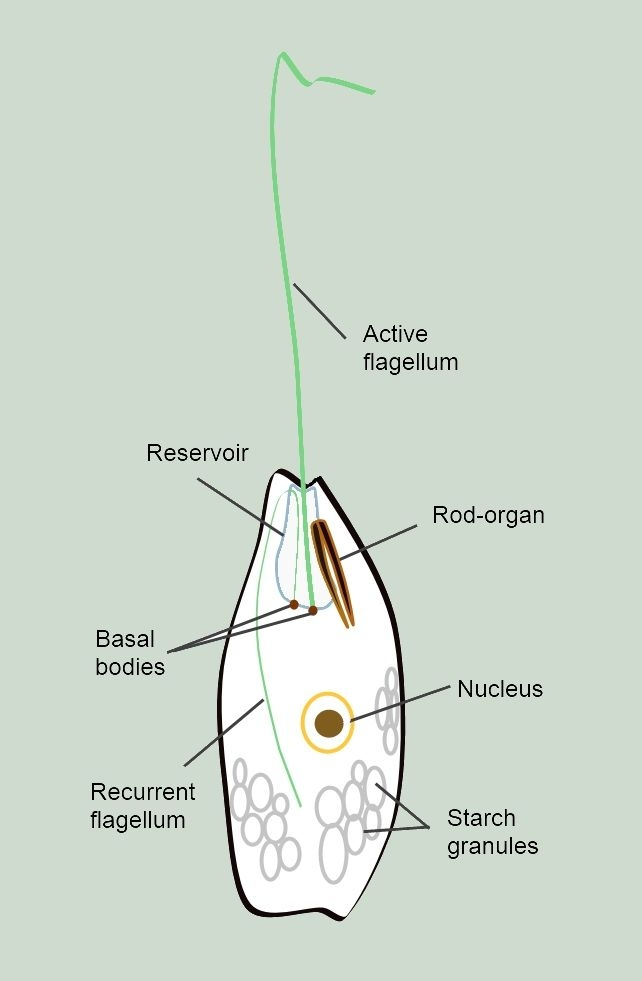
Peranema

Peranema's basic anatomy is that of a typical euglenid. The cell is spindle or cigar-shaped, somewhat pointed at the anterior end. It has a pellicle with parallel finely-ridged proteinaceous strips underlain by microtubules arranged in a helical fashion around the body. With this type of pellicle, which is shared by many euglenids, the spiraling microtubular strips are able to slide past one another, giving the organism an extremely plastic and changeable body shape. This permits a type of squirming motility, sometimes referred to as "euglenoid movement" or "metaboly". When it is not gliding or swimming (poorly), Peranema can move by metaboly, progressing with wavelike contractions of the body, reminiscent of peristalsis.

At the anterior of the cell, there is a narrow aperture, opening into a flask-shaped "reservoir", from which the organism's two flagella emerge. At the bottom of this reservoir lie the basal bodies (centrioles) from which the flagella extend. One flagellum is relatively long and conspicuous, and when the Peranema is gliding it is held stiffly in front. At the tip of the flagellum, a short segment beats and flails in a rhythmic manner, possibly as a mechanism for detecting and contacting potential prey. Peranama usually glides belly-down, without rotating.

The second flagellum is difficult to see with bright field microscopy, and was entirely overlooked by early observers. It emerges from the same reservoir as the larger propulsive flagellum, but turns toward the posterior. It does not sit freely, like the trailing flagella of Dinema and Entosiphon, but adheres to the outside of the cell membrane, in a groove along its ventral surface.

Next to the reservoir, lies Peranema's highly developed feeding apparatus, a cytostomal sac supported on one side by a pair of rigid rods, fused together at the anterior end. The use of this "rod-organ" in feeding has attracted considerable scholarly interest. Some early researchers speculated that it might assist Peranema in tearing up and consuming its food; while others held that it was actually a tubular construction, serving as a cytopharynx. In 1950, Y. T. Chen accurately identified it as a structure separate from the reservoir, which could be used by Peranama to cut and pierce its prey. Brenda Nisbet questioned this, on the grounds that, when examined closely with an electron microscope, the rod-organ is blunt, and therefore an improbable instrument for either cutting or piercing. Since the rod-organ had been seen to move back and forth during feeding, Nisbet argued that its primary function is to create suction, drawing prey into the cytostome.

In 1997, Richard Triemer returned to the subject, to confirm Chen's opinion that Peranema has a dual feeding technique. It can swallow prey whole, pulling large flagellates through the cytostome, in a manner similar to that proposed by Brenda Nisbet. However, it can also choose a more elaborate style of attack. Sometimes, it will press its cytostome against its prey, and then move the rod-organ up and down, using a rasping motion to chew a hole in its victim's cell membrane. After consuming some of the protoplasm, the Peranema may then insert its large flagellum into the hole, using it to churn up the contents of the cell so that they may be more easily sucked out. This continues until nothing is left of the prey but the tattered remnants of its pellicle.

== Phylogeny and classification ==
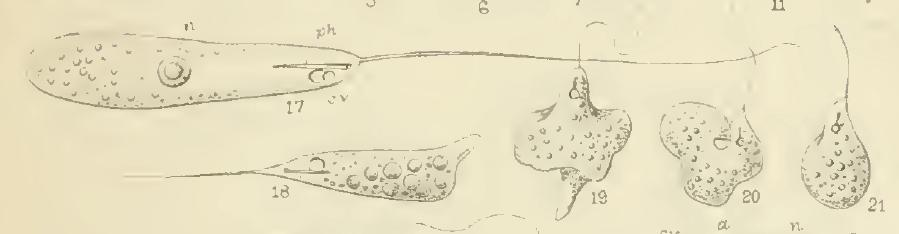
Peranema, as drawn by William Saville-Kent in 1880

When Dujardin created the genus Peranema in 1841, he was unable to detect the second flagellum and classified it with other ostensibly uniflagellate "Eugléniens," Astasia and Euglena. In 1881 Georg Klebs drew a taxonomical distinction between colorless uniflagellates that live by phagotrophy (Peranema and Astasia) and the green uniflagellates that photosynthesize (Euglena). This distinction was generally abandoned after the publication, in 1952, of a major revision of the euglenoids. In 1997, a combined morphological and molecular analysis of certain euglenoids identified Peranama trichophorum, Euglena gracilis and Khawkinea quartana as a distinct monophyletic lineage, with P. trichophorum basal to the other two species.

== Video gallery ==
Video of Peranema sp. in phase contrast microscopy, from the YouTube channel of microuruguay.

Video of Peranema sp., showing the ingestion apparatus, from the YouTube channel of microuruguay.

== Species ==
- Peranema asperum, Playfair
- Peranema asperum var. ''rectangulare, Playfair
- Peranema cryptocercum, (Skuja) Popova
- Peranema cuneatum, Playfair
- Peranema curvicauda, Skuja
- Peranema deflexum, Skuja
- Peranema dolichonema
- Peranema furcatum, Skvortzov
- Peranema fusiforme, Larsen, 1987
- Peranema glabrum, Van Ove
- Peranema globulosa, F. Dujardin
- Peranema granuliferum, Penard
- Peranema hyalinum, Christen
- Peranema inflexum, Skuja
- Peranema kupfferi, Skuja
- Peranema limax, Christen
- Peranema nigrum, Christen
- Peranema ovale, Lackey
- Peranema macrostoma, Ekebom, Patterson & Vors
- Peranema macromastix, Conrad
- Peranema pleururum, Skuja
- Peranema sacculus, Christen
- Peranema trichophorum, (Ehrenberg) Stein
- Peranema truncatum, Skvortzov
