= Intertidal biofilm =

Aggregation of microorganisms in low coastline

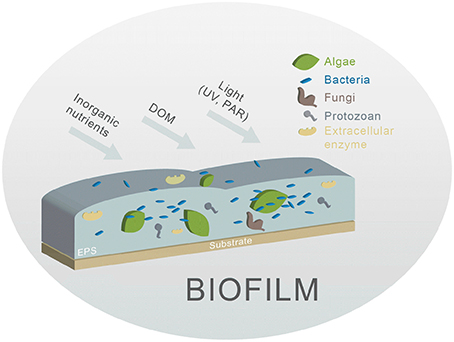
Biofilms in marine environments Various biofilm components (including bacteria, algae, and fungi) are embedded in a matrix of extracellular polymeric substances.

An intertidal bioflim is a biofilm that forms on the intertidal region of bodies of water. Bacteria and various microorganisms, including algae and fungi, form communities of adhered cells called biofilms. A matrix of extracellular polymeric substances (EPS) within the biofilm forms sticky coatings on individual sediment particles and detrital surfaces. This feature protects bacteria against environmental stresses like temperature and pH fluctuations, UV exposure, changes in salinity, depletion of nutrients, antimicrobial agents, desiccation, and predation. Particularly, in the ever-changing environments of intertidal systems, biofilms can facilitate a range of microbial processes and create protective microenvironments where cells communicate with each other and regulate further biofilm formation via Quorum Sensing (QS).^{,} While biofilm formation is advantageous to bacteria and other microorganisms involved, the attachment of microorganisms to ship hulls can increase fuel consumption and emission of greenhouse gases, as well as introduce Non-Indigenous Species (NIS), potentially resulting in harmful economic and ecological impacts on the receiving ecosystems.

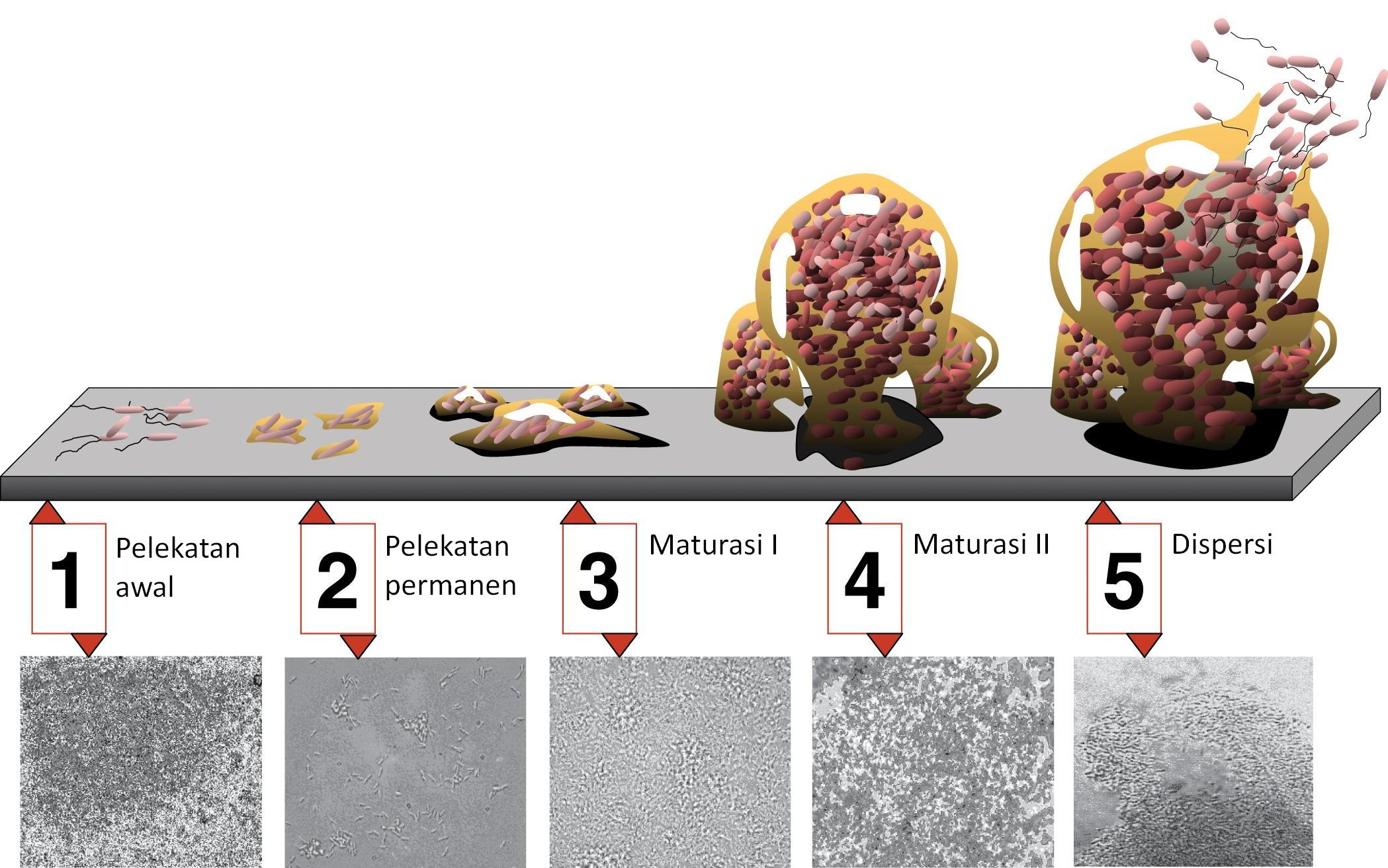
Stages of biofilm development 1) Initial Attachment 2) Irreversible Attachment 3) Maturation I 4) Maturation II 5) Dispersion.

== Formation and development ==
=== Biofilm formation ===
Biofilm formation begins with the initial attachment of microorganisms to a substrate, such as rocks, shells, or sand in the intertidal zone. This process occurs during the reversible attachment phase, in which the microorganisms only lightly adhere to the substrate. In this phase, the bacteria are encompassed in small amounts of EPS; they are still capable of individual movement and may return to planktonic life.^{,} Microorganisms may attach to the surface of substrates by weak Van der Waals forces and hydrophobic effects. A study of Pseudomonas aeruginosa mutants showed that twitching motility by type IV pili contributes to the organism's ability to aggregate on substrates. Another mechanism by which bacteria may adhere to surfaces is the binary division of attached cells. Similar to colony formation on agar plates, as cells divide, the daughter cells spread expansively, forming cell clusters. In all cases, adhesion depends on the microorganisms involved, the nature of the substrate, and the chemical and biological conditions of the environment.

The next stage is the irreversible attachment stage, in which microbes start producing EPS. This process creates a three-dimensional polymer network that acts as the biofilm matrix and encloses the bacteria. In this stage, EPS prevent bacterial cells from moving, keeping them in long-term close contact and allowing interactions such as cell-to-cell communication and horizontal gene transfer to occur. In most biofilms, the microbes constitute less than 10% of the dry mass, while the EPS matrix can comprise over 90%.

=== Biofilm development ===
==== Maturation ====
Following the irreversible phase, the next phase of the biofilm life cycle is maturation. In this stage, EPS play a critical role in protecting the biofilm from environmental fluctuations such as oxidative damage, antimicrobials, and host immune system response. Microcolonies are formed as a result of the aggregation of microbial cells and the increase of microbes with accessible nutrients. With the increase in cells, the biofilm matures and develops into a "tower" or "mushroom" like structure with a complex architecture of fluid-filled channels and pores.^{,}^{,}

==== Detachment ====
Detachment, also known as dispersal, is the final stage of the biofilm life cycle. In this stage, cells are released from the biofilm matrix, individually or in clusters, and either resume planktonic life or attach to another surface.^{,} Various factors can lead to cell detachment, including insufficient nutrients, competition, lack of oxygen, and environmental factors.

== Features ==
=== Taxonomic diversity ===
Marine biofilm communities have rich and diverse taxa, with Cyanobacteria and Proteobacteria being the dominant phyla. Actinobacteria, Bacteroidetes, and Planctomycetes are also considered to be dominant phyla but their relative abundances differ between locations. Site-specific differences also arise within intertidal biofilms. For instance, intertidal biofilms in Río de la Plata contained high amounts of Betaproteobacteria from the Thauera genus, whereas intertidal biofilms along the Pearl River Estuary contained Alphaproteobacteria and Gammaproteobacteria as the most prominent taxa.

=== Extracellular Polymeric Substances (EPS) ===
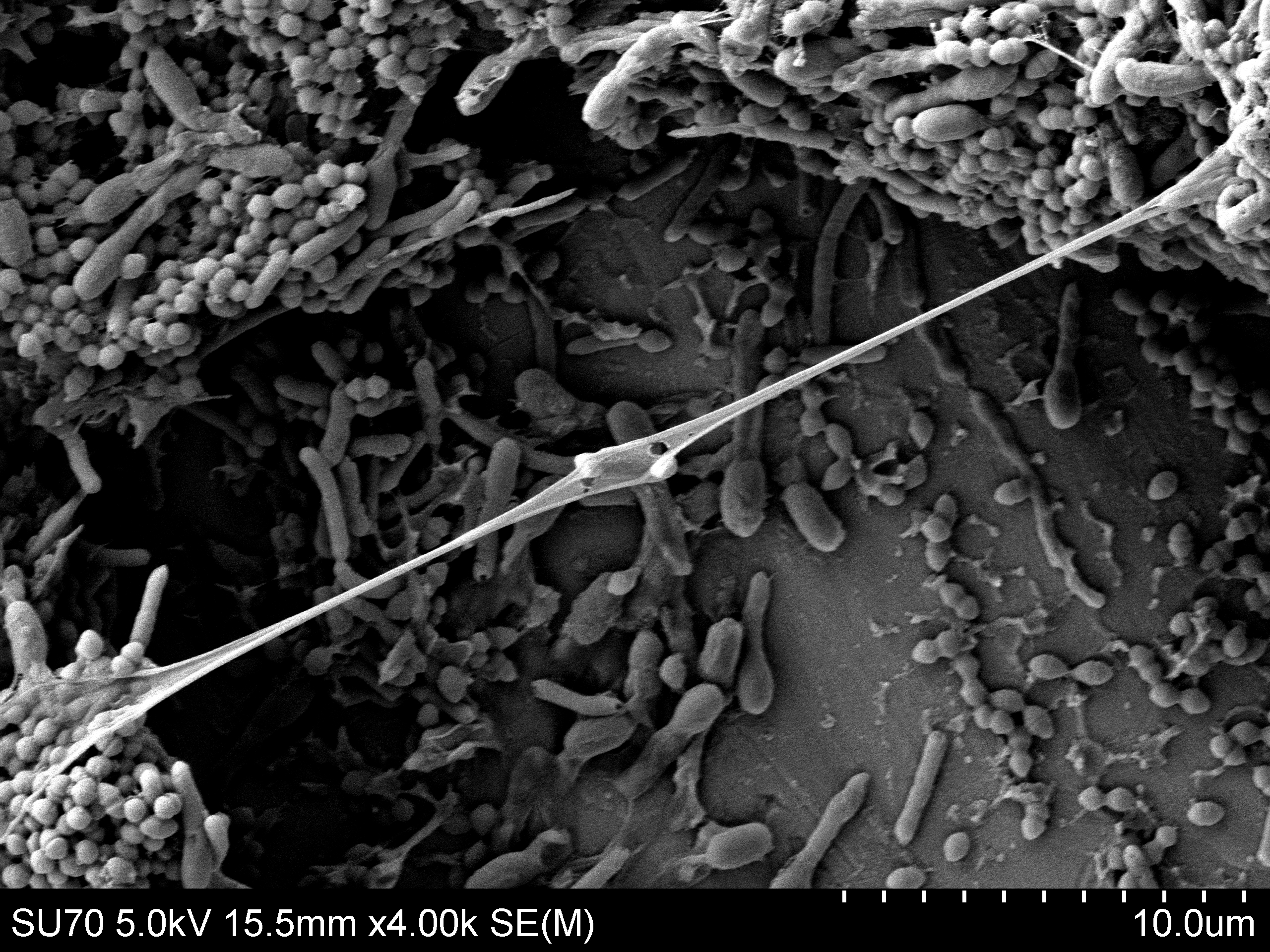
Scanning electron micrograph of mixed-culture biofilm, showing the arrangement of bacterial cells and extracellular polymeric substances

Diatoms are a major component of intertidal biofilms, and they excrete EPS that support many functions, such as desiccation resistance, motility, and metabolite exchange. The EPS produced by microalgae also enhance biofilm growth and help other members of the biofilm with adhesion and migration. EPS are mostly composed of polysaccharides, but may also include proteins, nucleic acids, lipids, and low-molecular-weight, non-carbohydrate compounds.

=== Seasonal variation ===
Intertidal biofilms exhibit stratification, where different microorganisms arrange themselves in layers based on factors like seasonality. Microalgae are found on the lower shore but their distribution can change. During the winter, a greater abundance and biomass of microalgae are found on the upper shore compared to the lower shore. Seasonal variability is also observed in the relative abundance of microalgae in intertidal biofilms. Specifically, microalgae in tropical and temperate intertidal biofilms are most abundant during winter and spring, with abundance decreasing in the warmer months. Cyanobacteria are relatively less affected by seasonal variation. This may be attributed to their greater tolerance to stressors such as temperature and insolation.

== Interactions within the biofilm ==
Interactions within biofilms are bidirectional. They can be affected by negative and positive feedback loops, as well as indirect effects. These interactions contribute to the resilience and adaptability of intertidal biofilms.

=== Trophic interactions ===
Within intertidal biofilms, trophic interactions exist between microphytobenthos and bacteria. EPS, which are produced by microphytobenthos, act as a trophic resource, but their large size makes them difficult to break down and assimilate. Bacteria secrete various enzymes like β-glucosidase to break down complex carbohydrate compounds in EPS. These carbohydrates serve as a nutrient source for heterotrophic bacteria and sulfate-reducing bacteria (SRB), as well as a carbon source for consumers such as marine invertebrates.

=== Quorum Sensing (QS) ===
Biofilm communities facilitate both intra-species communication and inter-species communication through QS, which relies on the production and release of signaling molecules known as autoinducers. When autoinducers reach a specific threshold concentration, signaling pathways are activated, resulting in physiological changes. QS, alongside other methods of cell signaling regulation, is important for intertidal biofilms, as it allows them to survive in fluctuating environments and varying conditions. This is because the expression of many genes in biofilms is shown to be density-dependent, with QS playing a crucial role in modulating feedback loops. Autoinducer signals have also resulted in biofilms having a very different architecture compared to those with no QS capabilities.

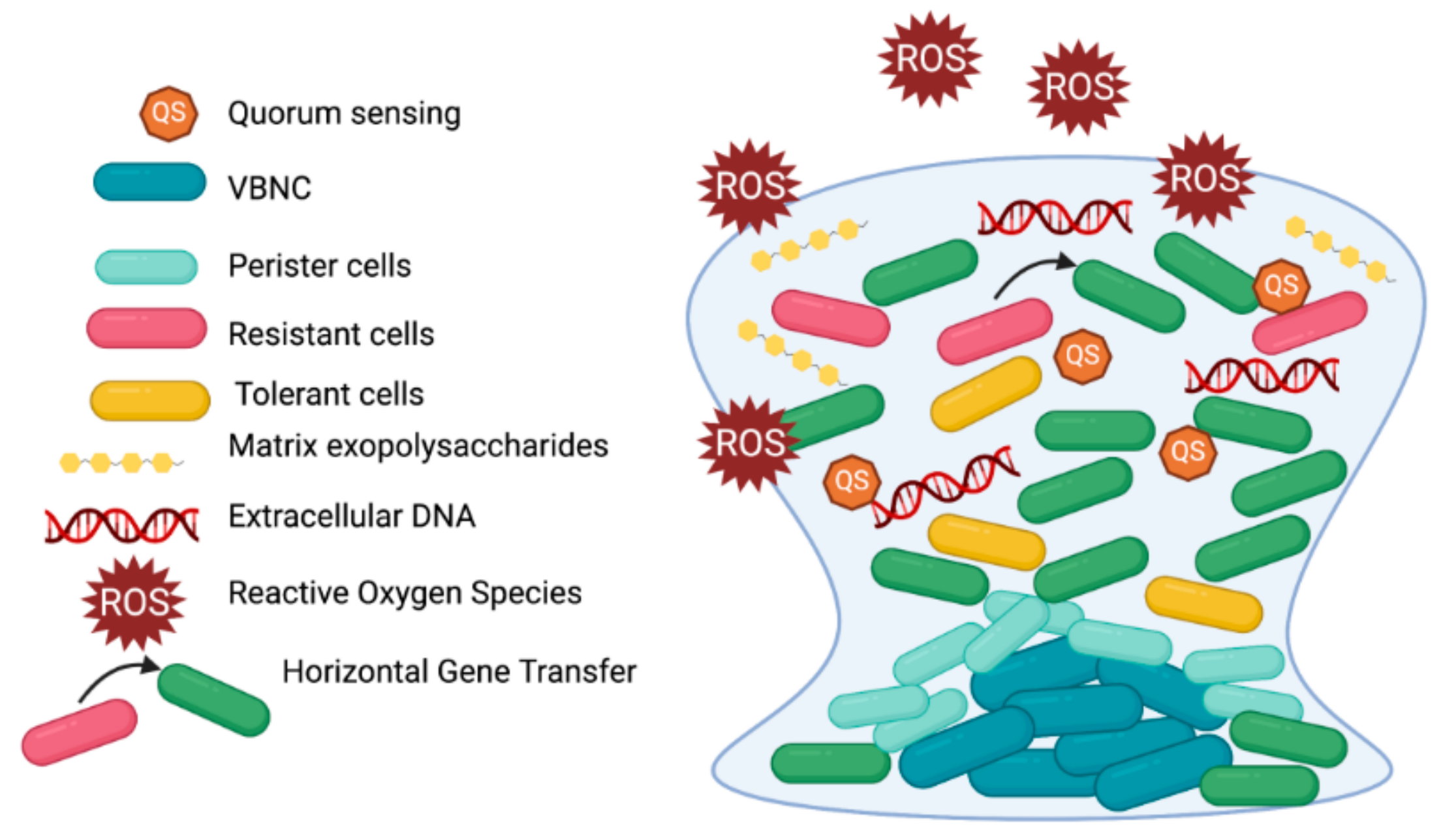
Various types of interactions within the biofilm(1) Communication through quorum sensing (2) Adaptations to varying conditions such as light

== Adaptations to varying conditions ==
Intertidal biofilms exhibit diverse adaptation mechanisms to cope with fluctuating conditions such as light stress, metal ion and oxidative stress, and desiccation stress.

=== Light stress ===
As intertidal biofilms are found in locations with fluctuating environmental conditions, biofilm microalgae are often damaged by the accumulation of reactive oxygen species (ROS). High levels of ROS induce photoinhibition, inactivating the photosystem II protein D1 and negatively affecting primary productivity. In these conditions, estuarine diatoms improve the efficiency of the xanthophyll cycle, limiting the amount of photodamage and providing the biofilm with a photo-protective mechanism. Vertical migration also allows members of the biofilm community to adapt to light stress. Cells migrate toward the sediment surface when a tide leaves, then migrate downwards upon the arrival of an incoming tide.

=== Metal ion and oxidative stress ===
Industrial activities in intertidal regions lead to increased concentrations of heavy metals such as copper, zinc, and cadmium, resulting in metal ion stress for the biofilms. To adapt to these conditions, genes involved in metal ion transport and secondary metabolism are over-expressed by intertidal microorganisms, allowing them to transport the heavy metals against electrochemical gradients and prevent toxicity. The expression of EPS is also enhanced when exposed to increased levels of heavy metals. EPS serves as an adaptive mechanism to tolerate metal ion stress as its components have functional groups that bind toxic heavy metals and prevent heavy metal toxicity.

=== Desiccation stress ===
Desiccation leads to a significant decrease in the photosynthetic activity of microphytobenthos in biofilms. To slow down desiccation, diatoms and bacteria in the biofilm produce EPS, decreasing the rate of water loss and dehydration. EPS produced from a Microbacterium species have also been identified to have surfactant properties, playing a role in protecting against desiccation. Alternatively, another protection mechanism against desiccation involves vertical migration, the same strategy that microorganisms use to protect against light stress. Motile diatoms migrate downwards when exposed to extreme light and temperature conditions, as this allows them to be present in a moist microenvironment and mitigate the effects on photosynthetic activity.

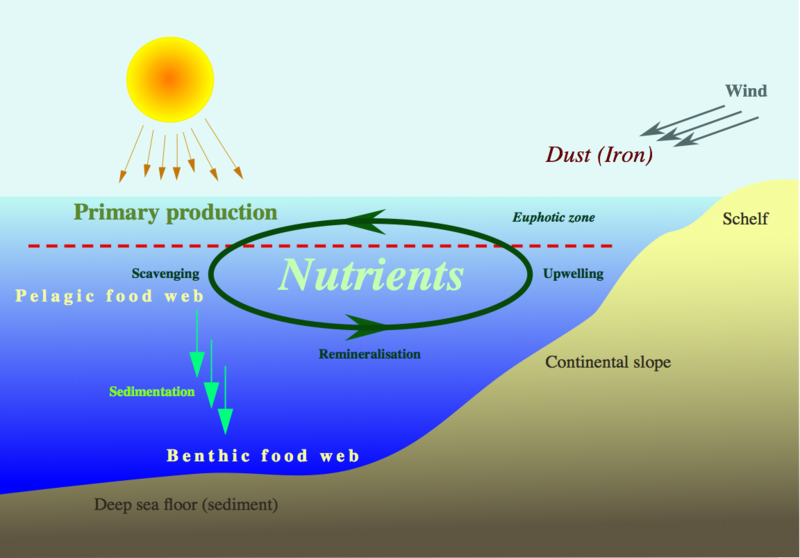
Nutrient cycling in the marine environment

== Ecological impact and functions ==
The cohesive nature of EPS contributes not only to the sediment's stability, preventing its resuspension under erosion, but also enhances flocculation processes. Flocculation processes involve the accumulation of fine sediments into larger flocs, modifying biogeochemical exchanges. This stabilization is important for geomorphologic evolution and the ecosystem health of coastal areas. A study from Jiangsu coast, China concluded that flocculation processes affect the density, particle size, and settling velocity of suspended particles, which are essential for sedimentation and sediment transport. These processes are also important in biogeochemical cycles for nutrients and heavy metals due to the adsorption ability and transport function of particles in flocs.

Intertidal marine biofilms on rocky substrates significantly impact estuarine carbon and nutrient dynamics. Biofilms in the Douro River estuary were observed to engage actively in biogeochemical processes, showing considerable net primary production that greatly exceeded respiration rates. These biofilms play a key role in nutrient fluxes, consistently removing nitrate and silicate from the water column while exhibiting variable fluxes of ammonium depending on light conditions, indicating a preference for ammonium assimilation by primary producers within the biofilms. Despite their limited spatial coverage, rocky biofilms account for a significant portion of the nitrate and silicate uptake compared to adjacent sandy and muddy sediments within the estuary.

== Impacts of anthropogenic activities ==
=== Biofouling on marine structures ===
The attachment and growth of marine organisms on submerged artificial structures, such as ship hulls and aquaculture infrastructures, can cause ecological and economic issues. This biofouling leads to increased drag resistance, fuel consumption, and greenhouse gas emissions for ships. It also restricts water exchange, raises disease risk, and causes deformation in aquaculture setups.

=== Introduction of Non-Indigenous Species (NIS) ===
Biofouling on ships, both as hull fouling and through solid ballast (sand, rocks, and soil), is a major pathway for the arrival of NIS into new regions. This introduces significant risks to receiving ecosystems, potentially resulting in significant economic and ecological impacts. Ports, which are primary receivers of maritime trade goods, are particularly at high risk for NIS introductions. Monitoring NIS presence and impacts, while implementing preventive measures to minimize their settlement, are critical for marine environmental management.

=== Resilience of biofilms on human activities ===
A research study conducted along the southeast coast of Brazil showed that human activities, such as trampling, were minimal. A trend of increased variability in biofilm biomass was observed with more intense trampling but no significant differences were found across trampling frequencies and intensities. The microorganisms' small size, which prevents complete removal by trampling, and the biofilms' capacity for rapid recovery may contribute to their high resilience to physical disturbance.
