= Discontinuous group =

Mathematical concept

A discontinuous group is a mathematical concept relating to mappings in topological space.

== Definition ==
Let $T$ be a topological space of points $\tau$, and let $\tau\to f(\tau,x)$, $x\in G$, be an open continuous representation of the topological group $G$ as a transitive group of homeomorphic mappings of $T$ on itself. The representation $\tau\to f(\tau,a)$ $a\in H$ of the discrete subgroup $H\sub G$ in $T$ is called discontinuous, if no sequence $f(\tau,a_n)$ ($n=1,2,\ldots$) converges to a point in $T$, as $a_n$ runs over distinct elements of $H$.
