= David J. Patterson =

Northern Irish taxonomist (born 1950)

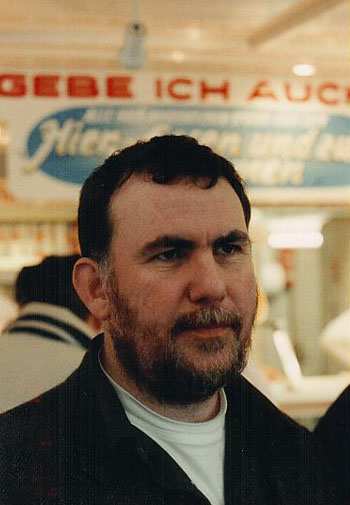
- David J. Patterson, island of Sylt, 1992
- Born: 19 April 1950 (age 76); Belfast
- Education: Queen's University Belfast (BSc 1971), University of Bristol (PhD 1976)
- Known for: Work towards establishing a complete phylogeny for eukaryotes
- Awards: Thomas Henry Huxley prize and the Scientific Medal of the Zoological Society of London
- Scientific career
- Fields: Taxonomy, specializing in protozoa
- Workplaces: University of Bristol; University of Sydney; Arizona State University; Brown University, Providence, Rhode Island

David Joseph Patterson (born 19 April 1950) is a Northern Irish taxonomist specializing in protozoa and the use of taxonomy in biodiversity informatics.

== Early life and education ==
David Joseph Patterson was born in Belfast, Northern Ireland on 19 April 1950 to Doris Mary (née Bell) and Samuel Patterson, with one elder brother (mathematician Samuel James) and a sister (Frances Mary). Father of Alice Mia Vørs Patterson, Daniel Kieran Patterson, and William Patterson. He was educated at Belmont Primary, Strandtown and Grosvenor High schools in Belfast. He obtained his Bachelor of Science with first-class honours at Queen's University Belfast in 1971.

== Career ==
David Patterson obtained a Doctor of Philosophy from the University of Bristol in 1976, where he was later employed (1977–1993). He obtained his Doctor of Science in 1990 from Queen's University, Belfast. In 1993 he moved to the University of Sydney in Australia where he became Head of the School of Biological Sciences. In 2004, he moved to the Marine Biological Laboratory in Woods Hole (Mass., USA) where he helped to establish the Encyclopedia of Life project with responsibility for the informatics component, basing EOL on the model developed with the micro*scope project.. From 2012-2014 he was a Research Professor at Arizona State University; and also was Professor (MBL) at Brown University in Providence, Rhode Island, and an Emeritus Professor of the University of Sydney, Sydney, Australia. As a taxonomist, his primary interests were in the diversity of protozoa and the evolution of protists. He and his co-workers described about 250 new taxa. David Patterson was awarded the Thomas Henry Huxley prize and the Scientific Medal of the Zoological Society of London; has been Secretary of the British Section of the Society of Protozoologists; President of the International Society for Evolutionary Protistology; and Vice-President of the (International) Society of Protozoology. He served as a member of the International Commission for Zoological Nomenclature, of the Editorial Committee for Algae of the International Association for Plant Taxonomy, of the Executive Committee of the International Union of Biological Sciences, and of the Scientific Committee of the World Data System.

He has published approximately 200 peer-reviewed papers including several books throughout his career. Initial interests in ion physiology, volume regulation, and contractile vacuoles shifted to ultrastructural studies, a technique that reshaped the understanding of protist diversity, in turn being further enriched through comparative molecular studies. With Guy Brugerolle, he introduced his concept that clades of protists could usefully be identified by the complement and arrangement of organelles - that is, their ultrastructural identity. He later used this concept along with the rationale of transformed cladistics to redefine the diversity of clades among eukaryotes. This simplified the challenge of establishing a complete phylogeny for eukaryotes by providing a list of the clades among which relatedness was to be established.

In the mid-1980's, Patterson focussed his efforts on free-living heterotrophic flagellates because they were poorly known and were not being actively investigated. Two areas of research were impeded because of the lack of awareness of flagellate diversity. The first was with the emerging concept of Microbial Food Webs that was transforming appreciation of the dynamics of ocean ecosystems - itself critical to the international Joint Global Ocean Flux Study targeting a better understanding of carbon fluxes and global warming. Secondly, 9+2 based flagella appeared with or shortly after the origin of eukaryotes, an understanding of the variety of flagellate diversity was expected to create better insights into eukaryotic origins and evolution. With co-workers, this led to recognition of new domains of protistan diversity - such as stramenopiles, alveolates, and the excavates (Excavata) - robustly defined by reference to evolutionary innovations (apomorphies), then a rare practice in protist taxonomy.

Patterson explored the emerging and largely theoretical concept that most microbes should have a universal distribution, initially articulated by Lourens Baas Becking, and refreshed by Tom Fenchel and Bland Finlay. Applying standardized sampling, documentation, and reporting protocols, to communities in marine, freshwater, and extreme sites, in Pacific and Atlantic locations, northern and southern hemispheres, in coastal habitats and deep ocean sediments (etc.), he and co-workers refuted the hypothesis that the taxonomic composition of communities of free-living flagellates were determined by geographic factors. This insight eliminated the need for local catalogues and expertise, accelerating taxonomic, phylogenetic, and ecological studies involving flagellates.

Latterly, his interests shifted to embedding taxonomic expertise in tools that manage biodiversity information. He led the implementation team of the Encyclopedia of Life project, was subsequently appointed Senior Taxononomist to the project, and as adviser to the Alfred P. Sloan Foundation, a coPI of the Data Conservancy and of the NSF-funded Global Names project, and member of the Plazi team. He was a prime mover of the Global Names Architecture project.
