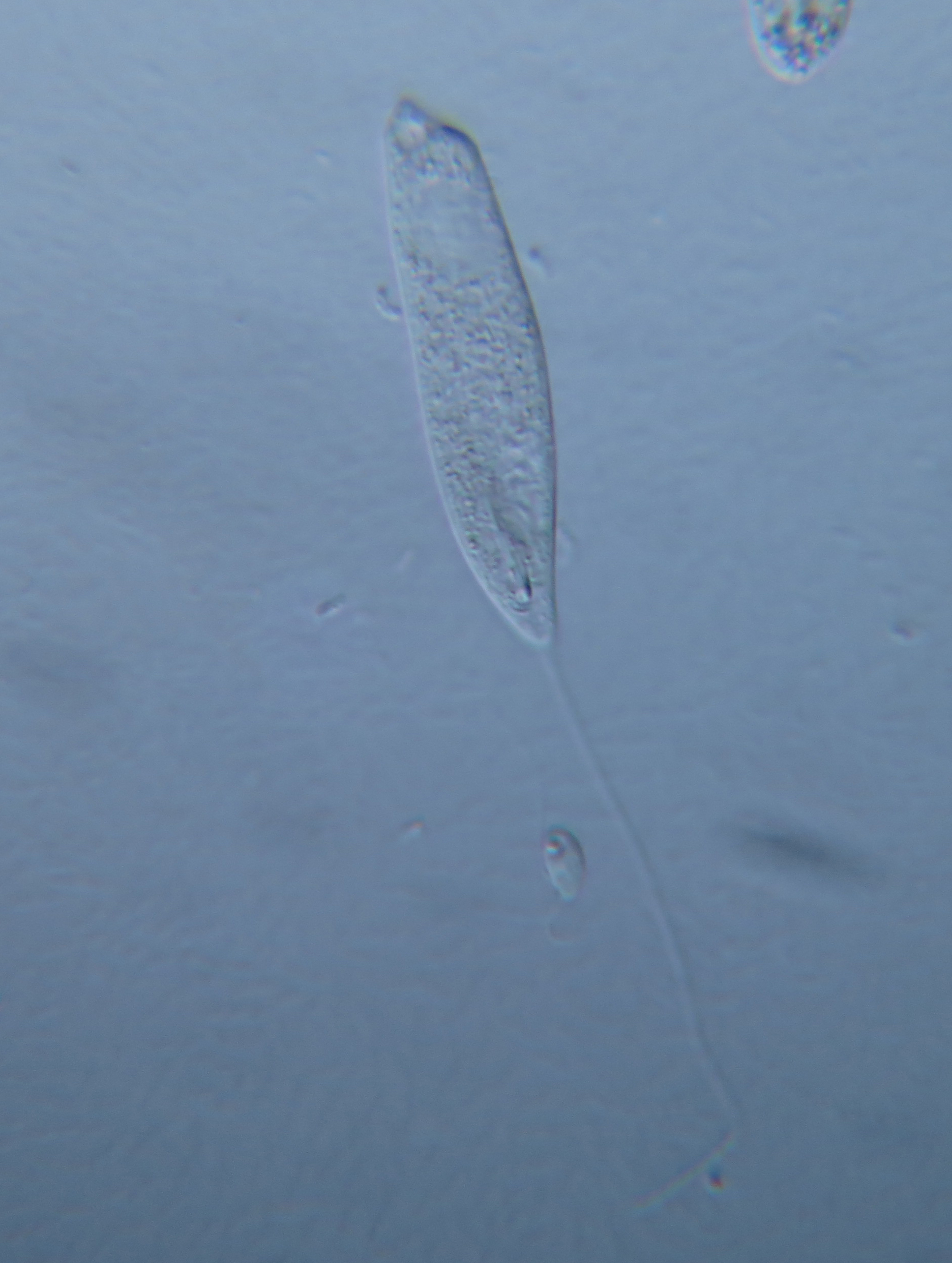
- Light microscopy photograph of a Peranema species

Scientific classification
- Domain: Eukaryota
- (unranked): incertae sedis
- Clade: Discoba
- Phylum: Euglenozoa
- Class: Euglenida
- Clade: Spirocuta
- Order: Peranemida; Cavalier-Smith, 1993
- Family: Peranemidae; Bütschli, 1884

Type genus
- Peranema Dujardin, 1841

Genera
- Chasmostoma; Jenningsia; Peranema; Urceolus

= Peranemid =

Group of flagellates

The peranemids are a group of phagotrophic flagellates, single-celled eukaryotes or protists. They belong to the Euglenida, a diverse lineage of flagellates that contains the closely related euglenophyte algae. Like these algae, peranemids have flexible cells capable of deformation or metaboly, and have one or two flagella in the anterior region of the cell. They are classified as family Peranemidae (ICZN) or Peranemataceae (ICBN) within the monotypic order Peranemida (ICZN) or Peranematales (ICBN).

== Description ==
Peranemids are unicellular eukaryotes or protists. They are flagellates, with one or two flagella for locomotion. The flagella are located in the anterior end of the cell, and are used in a gliding motion in contact with the substrate to propel the cell forward. In addition, like some other euglenids, their cells exhibit a certain movement known as metaboly or 'euglenid motion' characterized by extreme flexibility and malleability.

== Evolution ==
Peranemids are a group of Euglenida, a diverse lineage of flagellates containing the closely related euglenophycean algae. In particular, both peranemids and euglenophytes belong to the Spirocuta clade, which contains all flexible euglenids capable of elastic movement or metaboly. This quality is due to the high number of proteinaceous strips that are present underneath their cell membrane, in comparison to more basal euglenids such as ploeotids which are completely rigid.

In molecular phylogenetic analyses, they were solved as a paraphyletic group encompassing various independent clades scattered across the Spirocuta clade. More recent multigene analyses resolve peranemids as the monophyletic sister group of the photosynthetic Euglenophyceae. These findings are summarized in the following cladogram:

- Euglenida
  - - - - Spirocuta
          - - Euglenophyceae
            - Peranemida
              - - - Urceolus
                  - Chasmostoma
                - - "Jenningsia"
                  - Peranema
              - "Jenningsia"
          - Anisonemia
        - Olkasia
      - - Liburna
        - Entosiphon
    - Alistosa
  - Petalomonadida

== Classification ==
Currently, four genera are accepted within the peranemids, Teloprocta has been placed in a new order named Acroglissida in Spirocuta instead.

- Peranema Christen, 1962
- Chasmostoma Massart, 1920
- Jenningsia Schaeffer, 1918 (=Peranemopsis Lackey, 1940)
- Urceolus Mereschkowsky, 1877 (=Phialonema Stein, 1878; Urceolopsis Stokes, 1887)
