= Ursulinius elegans =

Scientific classification
- Kingdom: Animalia
- Phylum: Tardigrada
- Class: Eutardigrada
- Order: Parachela
- Genus: Ursulinius
- Species: U. elegans

Binomial name
- Ursulinius elegans (Binda and Pilato, 1971)

Synonyms
- Hypsibius elegans Binda & Pilato, 1971; Isohypsibius elegans (Binda & Pilato, 1971)

Species of tardigrade

Ursulinius elegans is a species of tardigrade in the class Eutardigrada. It is found in Sicily, Italy.
