= Ursulinius =

Scientific classification
- Kingdom: Animalia
- Phylum: Tardigrada
- Class: Eutardigrada
- Order: Parachela
- Superfamily: Isohypsibioidea
- Genus: Ursulinius; Gąsiorek, Stec, Morek & Michalczyk, 2019

Type species
- Ursulinius pappi (Iharos, 1966)

Genus of tardigrades

Ursulinius is a genus of tardigrades in the superfamily Isohypsibioidea. It contains 21 species.

== Species ==
Ursulinius contains the following species:

- Ursulinius austriacus (Iharos, 1966)
- Ursulinius cameruni (Iharos, 1969)
- Ursulinius dudichi (Iharos, 1964)
- Ursulinius duranteae (Maucci, 1978)
- Ursulinius elegans (Binda & Pilato, 1971)
- Ursulinius eplenyiensis (Iharos, 1970)
- Ursulinius glaber (Durante Pasa & Maucci, 1979)
- Ursulinius josephi (Iharos, 1964)
- Ursulinius leithaicus (Iharos, 1966)
- Ursulinius neoundulatus (Durante Pasa & Maucci, 1975)
- Ursulinius novaeguineae (Iharos, 1967)
- Ursulinius pappi (Iharos, 1966)
- Ursulinius pilatoi (Durante Pasa & Maucci, 1979)
- Ursulinius qinlingensis (X. Li, L. Wang & Yu, 2005)
- Ursulinius roberti (Biserov, 1996)
- Ursulinius ronsisvallei (Binda & Pilato, 1969)
- Ursulinius rudescui (Iharos, 1966)
- Ursulinius septentrionalis (Thulin, 1928)
- Ursulinius truncorum (Iharos, 1964)
- Ursulinius tucumanensis (Claps & Rossi, 1984)
- Ursulinius woodsae (Kathman, 1990)
