= Gazit (surname) =

Gazit is a Hebrew surname. It is the 930,678th most common surname in the world (2022) It may refer to:

- Doron Gazit (born 1953), Israeli environmental artist, activist and industrial designer
- Dov Gazit (1908–1986), chief-commander of the IAF (Israeli Air Force) Technical School
- Ehud Gazit, Israeli biochemist, biophysicist and nanotechnologist
- Eshy Gazit, music industry executive best known for his work as the CEO of Gramophone Media
- Gabi Gazit (born 1947), Israeli journalist, television personality and radio host
- Mordechai Gazit (1922–2016), Israeli diplomat
- Shlomo Gazit (born 1926), retired Israeli military officer and academic, President of Ben-Gurion University
- Tomer Sisley (born Tomer Gazit; 1974), Israeli humorist, actor, screenwriter, comedian, and film director
