= Sammy Boussiba =

Israeli biologist

- סמי בוסיבה
- Born: 30 August 1947 (age 79); Fez, Morocco
- Education: Ben-Gurion University of the Negev
- Scientific career
- Fields: Microalgae
- Workplaces: Ben-Gurion University of the Negev
- Doctoral advisor: Amos Richmond

Sammy Boussiba (Hebrew: סמי בוסיבה) is a professor emeritus at the French Associates Institute for Agriculture and Biotechnology of Drylands at the Jacob Blaustein Institutes for Desert Research at Ben-Gurion University of the Negev, Israel.

== Early life ==
Sammy Boussiba was born in Fez, Morocco to a Jewish family. In 1956 he emigrated to Israel with his parents and two brothers. He began his academic path in 1969, and received his bachelor's and master's degrees from the Hebrew University of Jerusalem and from BGU. He moved on to his doctorate studies at BGU, focusing on the role of the biliprotein picocyanin C and the influence of environmental factors on its metabolism, under the supervision of Professor Amos Richmond. He completed his PhD in 1981 and continued to his postdoctoral studies at Cornell University, with scholarships from the Rothschild and Fulbright foundations. At Cornell he studied the uptake and metabolism of ammonia in cyanobacteria.

== Academic career ==
In 1984, upon completing his postdoctoral studies and returning to Israel, Boussiba joined the Microalgal Biotechnology Laboratory (MBL) at Jacob Blaustein Institutes for Desert Research BIDR, BGU. He has served as the head of the lab since 1995. During the years 2001–2005 he also served as the substitute to the director of BIDR and during the years 2008–2015 he served as director of the French Associates Institute for Agriculture and Biotechnology of Drylands at BIDR.

== Awards ==
In 2003 Boussiba was awarded an honorary doctorate (honoris causa) from the University of West Hungary, which was the first European university to establish an agriculture faculty. He was bestowed with the economical botanics chair from BGU. Since 2004 he has served in the board of directors of the International Society of Applied Phycology. In 2005 he was elected as the president of the society, and also served as its president between 2008 and 2011. In a conference which took place in Australia in June 2014, Professor Boussiba received a special award of appreciation from this society, for his continual and outstanding contribution to the field of applied phycology research. Between 2009 and 2012 Boussiba served as a member of the board of directors at the Inter-University Marine Biology and Biotechnology Institute in Eilat. In 2009 he was elected for an ad-hoc committee nominated by the National Science Academy of the United States, aimed at examining the sustainable development of algal fuels and oils, in which he served for two years. The committee's conclusions were published in a report aiming to formulate the US government's policy on alternative fuels. Since 2009 Boussiba has also served as a member of the European Algae Biomass Association (EABA), and since 2014 he has served as the head of its scientific board.

== Research ==
Production of astaxanthin from the haematococcus microalgae: The Haematococcus Pluvialis microalgae has been extensively researched for its ability to accumulate large quantities of the astaxanthin pigment, which is a potent naturally occurring anti-oxidant. A synthetic version of this pigment is currently used for obtaining pink-colored salmon fish for marketing. The production of this pigment in Haematococcus Pluvialis is enhanced due to various environmental stresses which limit the growth of the cell under light conditions. The production process is characterized by a transition in the cell's color from green to red, along with various chemical and biochemical changes within the cell which have been widely studied in recent years: defining the conditions under which the pigment is accumulated, studying the biosynthetic process; and examining the possible role of the pigment in protecting the cell from oxidative stress damage. One outcome of this work was the development of a two-stage process for production of astaxanthin – the algae is allowed to grow under optimal conditions for the green stage, then the biomass is subjected to stress conditions such as high light or nutrient deprivation.

One of the main challenges in large-scale production of biomass is the susceptibility to infections, especially when the growth medium is poor in nutrients- enabling the growth of various fungi and foreign algae. Indeed, one of the main pests which can cause the collapse of the Haematococcus Pluvialis culture is a fungus. In Prof. Boussiba's lab this fungus has been researched and isolated and defined as a new species (Paraphyzoderma Sedebokerensis). This fungi is a specific parasite for Haematococci cells. Following its cultivation under sterile conditions, its life cycle was defined and its mode of infection was studied. Results showed that there are special proteins (lectins) present on the zeospheres of the fungi which recognize specific sugar moieties upon the algal cell wall. The infection process begins with the interaction between the lectins and the sugar moieties, and can end with the collapse of the algae culture.

Prof. Boussiba's researches, spanning over ten years of work, were the basis for the establishment of an astaxanthin production plant from the Haematococcus microalgae in Kibbutz Ketura in the Arava valley – Algatech, which has been active since 2002.

Cloning of Bti bacterial genes into the Anabaena cyanobacteria for eradication of tropical diseases: The Bacillus thuringiensis (Bt) group of bacteria is an important agent used for biological pest control. Bt is a Gram positive, aerobic bacterium which during its sporulation stage produces an endotoxin protein crystal with high toxicity and specificity against various insect larvae. Bt toxins are termed insecticidal crystal proteins (ICPs) and are active within the intestine, thus must be digested by the target organism in order to act. The subspecies Bacillus thuringienesis israelensis (Bti) was isolated by Prof. Joel Margalit and colleagues (1977). It is a specific pesticide of mosquito larvae and of black flies, which transfer a large number of tropical, sometimes fatal diseases. This subspecies produces a crystal composed of four main proteins encoded by four genes which are situated on a single plasmid within the bacterium. However, the use of Bti as a biological pesticide is limited due to its low survivability rate in natural water ponds. One of the ways to overcome the survivability hurdle is to clone the genes encoding for the toxin into other organisms which are more adapted to the harsh environments in question. Due to their large species diversity and high abundancy in natural ponds and rice fields, cyanobacteria have high potential to serve as carriers for the endotoxin genes for pest control of mosquito larvae. Moreover, cyanobacteria are able to float in the upper layer of the water, and are stable under varying environmental conditions, as well as throughout entire growth cycles of the mosquitos, which feed off the cyanobacteria. The most lethal combination of Bti genes was cloned in Prof. Boussiba's laboratory in the Anabaena PCC 7120 cyanobacteria. This pioneering work yielded a transgenic cyanobacteria stably expressing four different Bti genes. The transgenic lines are very stable and are of high toxicity to the larvae. Moreover, they survived under field conditions for longer periods of time than the commercially available Bti pesticide. Since these clones are considered genetically modified organisms (GMO), the widespread use of this technology is still limited. This project, which lasted for several years, included the training of many research students and several prestigious research grants were obtained for it. This project is an example for the fruitful cooperation between two groups which are leading in their field – Prof. Zaritsky's lab and Prof. Boussiba's, where the transgenic cyanobacteria were isolated.

In recent years Prof. Boussiba's researches are focusing on genetic methods for improving microalgae in aim to produce valuable products such as carotenoids and PUFA – polyunsaturated fatty acids. One of the results of these researches is the development of a genetic engineering system for inserting genes into the genomes of two microalgal species of high economical value – Haematococcus Pluvialis for increasing the production rate of astaxanthin, and Parietochloris Incisa – for metabolic engineering of PUFA. Prof. Boussiba has led research projects in cooperation with researchers in Israel and worldwide, and during recent years he has been a partner in a large number of projects under the umbrella of the FP7 program of the European Union. He recently (2010–2013) managed the GIAVAP project- Genetically improved Algae for Valuable Products, in which ten European and two industrial companies from Israel and from abroad took part. This project was aimed at genetic modification of microalgae for production of valuable (5.4 MEuro) products. Prof. Boussiba is also a partner of the Israeli consortium for solar fuels, of the Israeli Centers of Research Excellence – ICORE, for which Ben-Gurion University was awarded with 3 million sheqels over the years 2012–2016. At the end of 2015 his lab received an additional grant of 1.7 million sheqels over three years from the Israeli Ministry of Agriculture, for developing an innovative system for vaccinating poultry against the Newcastle Disease, using genetically modified microalgae.

== Selected articles ==
- Boussiba, S.; Resh, C.M.; Gibson, J. (1984). "Ammonia uptake and retention in some cyanobacteria". Arch. Microbiol. 138 (4): 287–292. doi:10.1007/bf00410892. S2CID 23448652.
- Wu, X-Q.; Vennison, J.; Liu, H-R.; Ben-Dov, E.; Zaritsky, A.; Boussiba, S. (1997). "Mosquito larvicidal activity of transgenic Anabaena PCC 7120 expressing combinations of genes from Bacillus thuringiensis sp. israelensis". Applied and Environmental Microbiology. 63 (12): 4971–4975. doi:10.1128/AEM.63.12.4971-4974.1997. PMC 168827. PMID 9406420.
- Boussiba, S.; Richmond, A.E. (1979). "Isolation and characterization of Phycocyanins from the blue-green alga Spirulina platensis". Arch. Microbiol. 120 (2): 155–159. doi:10.1007/bf00409102. S2CID 5970316.
- Boussiba, S (2000). "Carotenogenesis in the green alga Haematococcus pluvialis". Physiologia Plantarum. 108: 111–117. doi:10.1034/j.1399-3054.2000.108002111.x.
- Hoffman, Y; Aflalo, C; Zarka, A; Gutman, J; James, TY; Boussiba, S (2008). "Isolation and characterization of a novel chytrid species (phylum Blastocladiomycota), parasitic on the green alga Haematococcus". Mycological Res. 112 (Pt 1): 70–81. doi:10.1016/j.mycres.2007.09.002. PMID 18222678.
- Leu, S.; Boussiba, S. (2014). "Advances in the production of high value products by microalgae". Industrial Biotechnology. 10 (3): 169–183. doi:10.1089/ind.2013.0039.
- Zorin, B.; Grundman, O.; Khozin-Goldberg, I.; Leu, S.; Shapira, M.; Kaye, Y.; Tourasse, N.; Vallon, O.; Boussiba, S. (2014). "Development of a nuclear transformation system for oleaginous green alga Lobosphaera (Parietochloris) incisa and genetic complementation of a mutant strain deficient in arachidonic acid biosynthesis". PLOS ONE. 9 (8) e105223. Bibcode:2014PLoSO...9j5223Z. doi:10.1371/journal.pone.0105223. PMC 4136796. PMID 25133787.
- Sharon-Gojman, R.; Maimon, E.; Leu, S.; Zarka, A.; Boussiba, S. (2015). "Advanced methods for genetic engineering of Haematococcus pluvialis (Chlorophyceae, Volvocales)". Algal Research. 10: 8–15. doi:10.1016/j.algal.2015.03.022.
- Shemesh, Z.; Leu, S.; Khozin-Goldberg, I.; Didi-Cohen, S.; Zarka, A.; Boussiba (2016). "Inducible expression of Haematococcus oil globule protein in the diatom Phaeodactylum tricornutum: Association with lipid droplets and enhancement of TAG accumulation under nitrogen starvation". Algal Research. 18: 321–331. doi:10.1016/j.algal.2016.07.002.
