= The Zuckerberg Institute for Water Research =

Israeli research institute

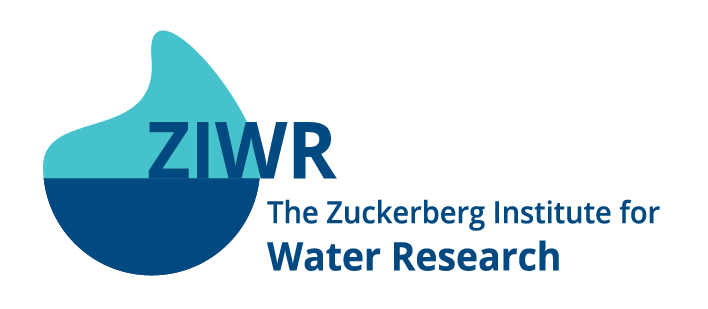
ZIWR

Zuckerberg Institute for Water Research (ZIWR) is one of three research institutes constituting the Jacob Blaustein Institutes for Desert Research, a faculty of Ben-Gurion University of the Negev (BGU). The ZIWR is located on BGU's Sede Boqer Campus in Midreshet Ben-Gurion in Israel's Negev Desert, and hosts researchers who focus on developing new technologies to provide drinking water and water for agricultural and industrial use and to promote the sustainable use of water resources. The ZIWR encompasses the Department of Environmental Hydrology and Microbiology, and the Department of Desalination and Water Treatment.

== History ==
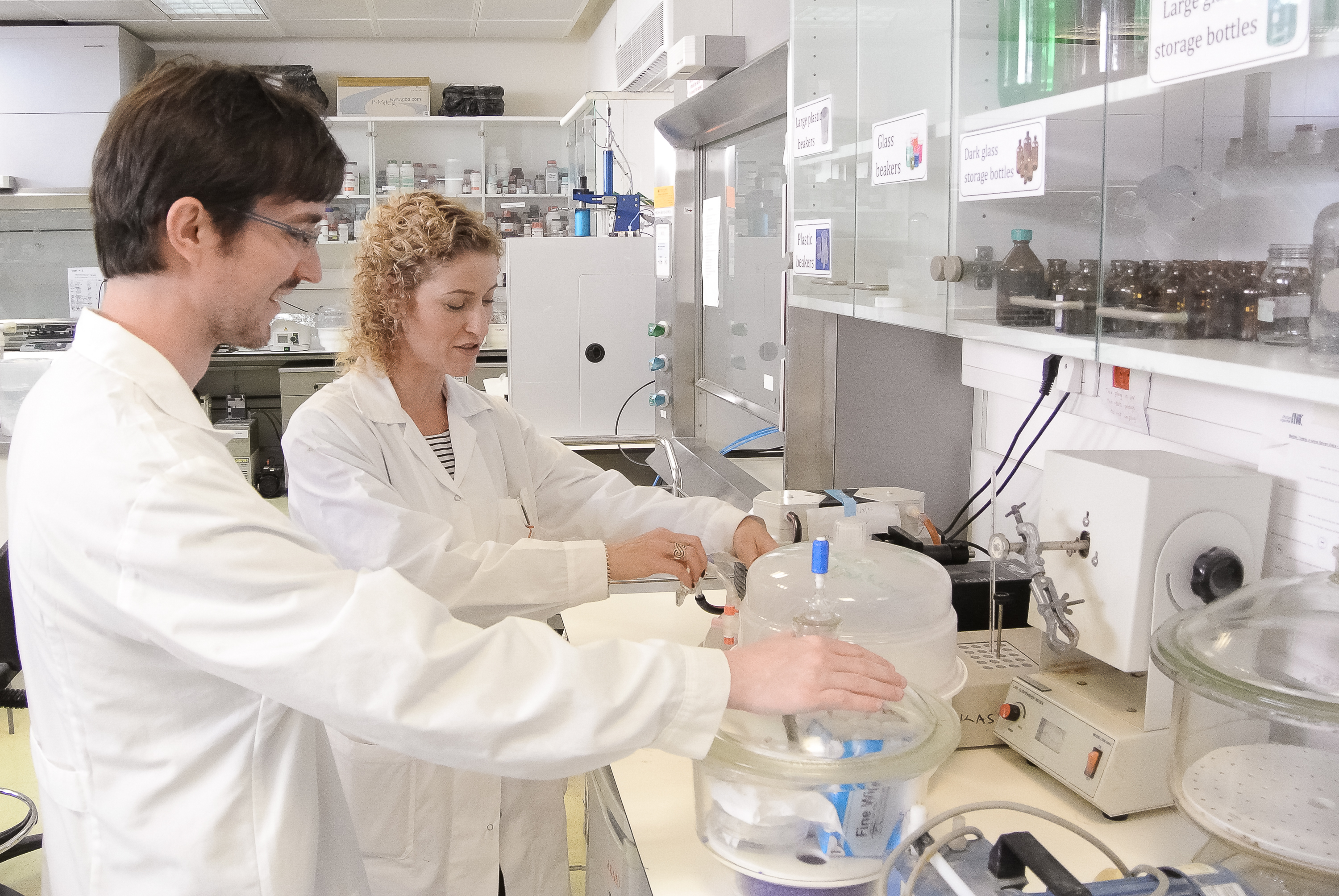
Water Quality Study

The Zuckerberg Institute for Water Research was founded in 2002 and was named for Roy J. Zuckerberg, Senior Director of the Goldman Sachs Group and a philanthropist, based in New York City. The ZIWR is one of three institutes currently constituting the Jacob Blaustein Institutes for Desert Research, which were originally established in 1974. In 2016, the estate of Dr. Howard and Lottie Marcus made a donation of $400 million to Ben-Gurion University, believed to be the largest gift ever to a university in Israel, with a portion of it going to the Zuckerberg Institute for Water Research for research into water resources and desalination technologies.

== Academic programs ==
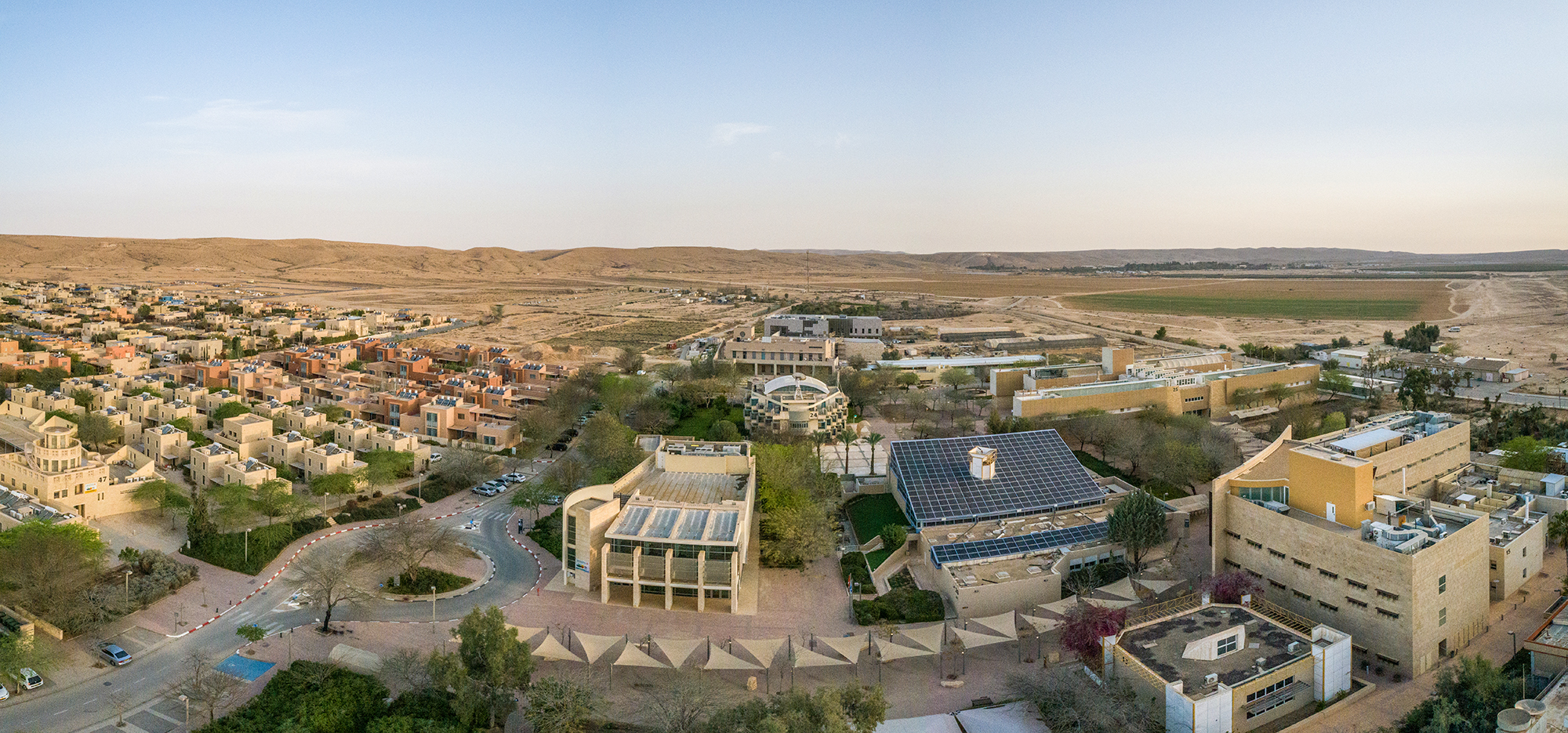
Sde Boker Campus

The Institute runs two departments: The Department of Environmental Hydrology and Microbiology, and the Department of Desalination and Water Treatment. It also offers an MSc degree in Hydrology and Water Quality, in collaboration with the Albert Katz International School for Desert Studies, which is located at BGU's Sde Boker Campus.

=== Department of Environmental Hydrology and Microbiology ===
The Department of Environmental Hydrology and Microbiology hosts researchers who specialize in hydrology, hydrogeology, chemistry, and microbiology. Some of their particular research areas include flow and transport processes, remediation of contaminated water, and biological treatment of wastewater.

=== Department of Desalination and Water Treatment ===
The Department of Desalination and Water Treatment employs researchers who focus on various aspects of desalination and water treatment processes including the improvement and development of membranes for reverse osmosis, forward osmosis, and nanofiltration processes; processes to eliminate toxic materials from industrial effluents and polluted groundwater; and brine concentrate management.

=== MSc in Hydrology and Water Quality ===
This master's degree program, offered through the Albert Katz International School for Desert Studies, aims to introduce students to research in water sciences with the goal of improving human life in drylands and the development of policies for the sustainable use of water resources. The program offers the following tracks of study: 1. Water Resources, 2. Desalination and Water Treatment, and 3. Microbiology and Water Quality.

== Research ==
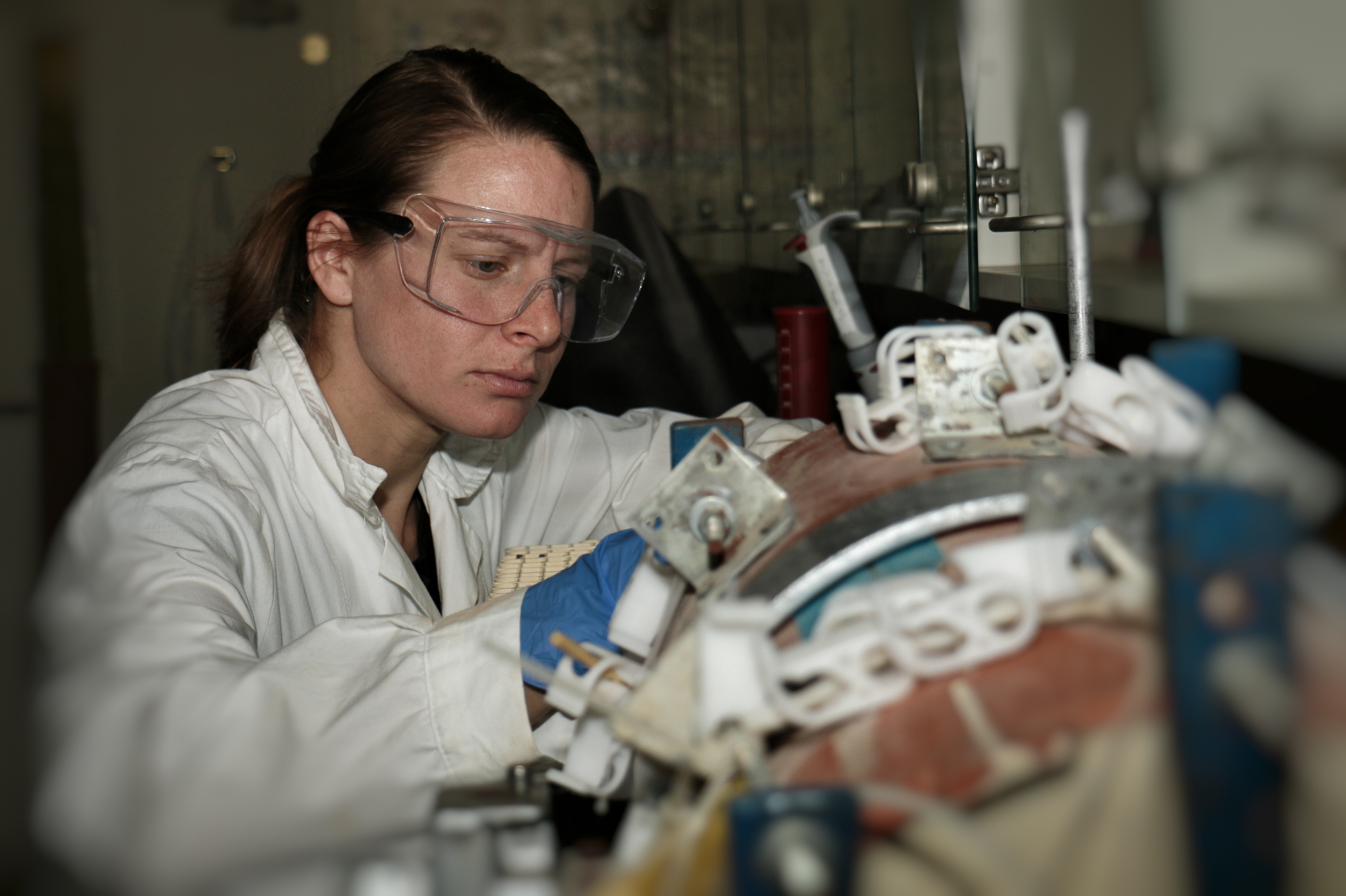
Water Research

Researchers from the ZIWR were involved in studies related to the COVID-19 pandemic. In the first, a study that was led by a team of researchers from the ZIWR and published in Nature Sustainability found that coronaviruses can persist in wastewater for several days, possibly leading to the spread of these viruses to humans. In another study, ZIWR researchers, in cooperation with scientists from Rice University in Houston, Texas, developed a laser-induced graphene technology that can filter airborne COVID-19 particles.
