= Noam Weisbrod =

Israeli scientist

- נעם ויסברוד
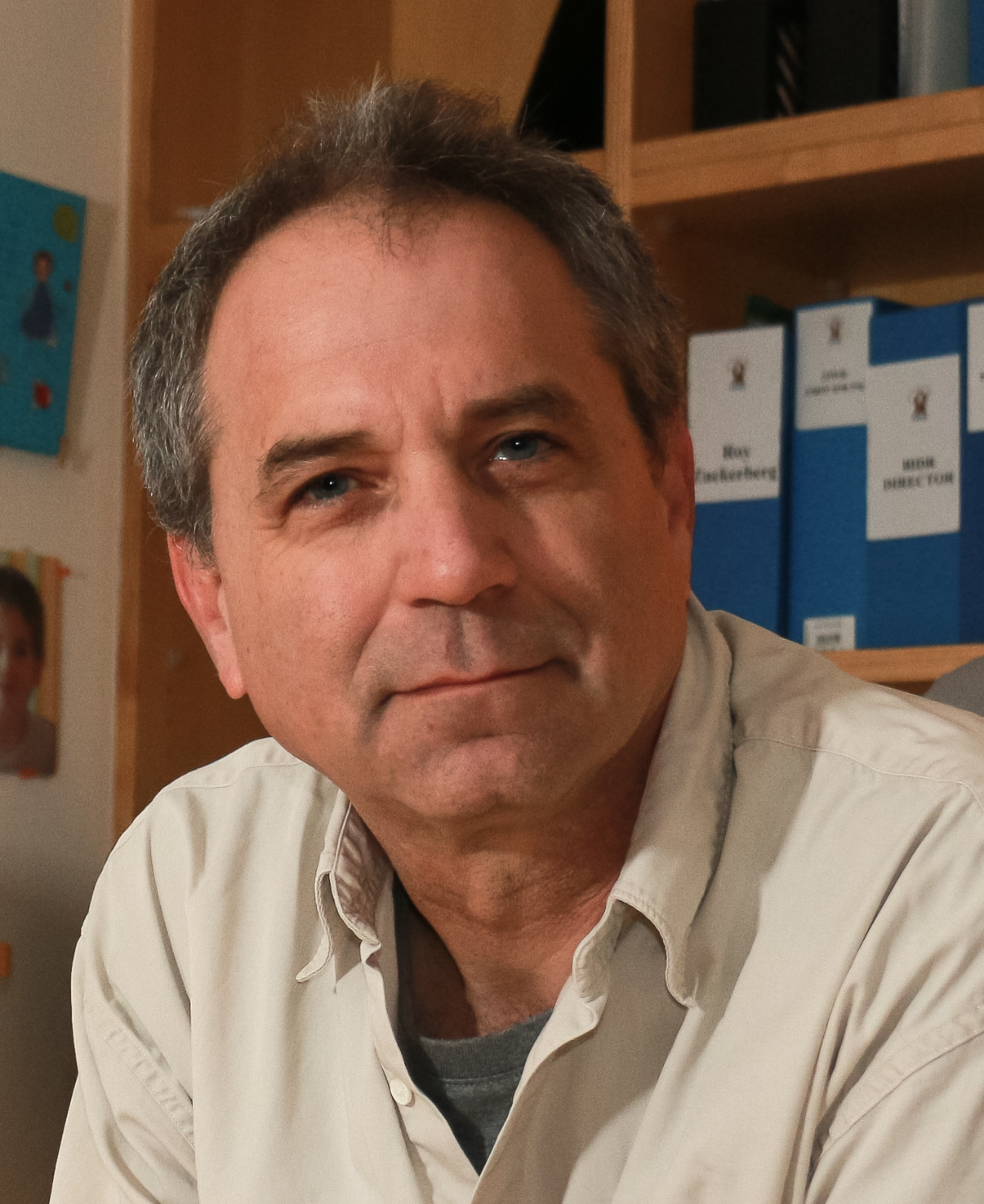
- Born: 1964 (age 61–62)
- Scientific career
- Fields: Hydrology
- Workplaces: Ben-Gurion University of the Negev
- Doctoral advisor: Prof. Ronit Nativ, Prof. Daniel Ronen, Prof. Eilon Adar
- Website: in.bgu.ac.il/en/bidr/ziwr/ehm/Pages/staff/weisbrod.aspx

Noam Weisbrod (Hebrew: נעם ויסברוד) is a Hydrology Professor (Alain Poher Chair in Hydrogeology and Arid Zone Research) at the Department of Environmental Hydrology and Microbiology of the Zuckerberg Institute for Water Research (ZIWR), which is part of the Jacob Blaustein Institutes for Desert Research (BIDR) at Ben-Gurion University of the Negev (BGU). Weisbrod served as director of ZIWR from 2015 to 2018. In 2018 he became director of BIDR and was reelected for a second term in summer 2022.

== Career ==
Weisbrod earned his undergraduate (1990) and graduate degrees (MSc, with distinction: 1993; PhD: 1999) from the Department of Soil and Water Sciences at the Hebrew University of Jerusalem. In 1999 he joined the Department of Bioengineering (now Biological & Ecological Engineering), Oregon State University as a post-doctoral fellow. In 2002 he returned to Israel where he joined the Zuckerberg Institute for Water Research (ZIWR) at the Jacob Blaustein Institutes for Desert Research (BIDR), Ben Gurion University of the Negev (BGU). During the summer of 2012, he held a Visiting Professorship at the Chinese Academy of Sciences, Chengdu. At Ben Gurion University, he has held numerous academic administration positions: from 2009 to 2015 he was the Head of the Department of Environmental Hydrology and Microbiology at the ZIWR, and he also served as the Director of the Blaustein Center for Scientific Cooperation (2013-2015). In 2015 he was elected as the ZIWR Director and in 2018 he was elected as the BIDR Director. Weisbrod has supervised more than 50 graduate students and served in numerous committees and panels. He has been involved in various international missions and evaluation panels to assess local water realities, in places like Chile, Inner Mongolia, Namibia and the Galapagos Islands. He was a member of the steering committee for BGU – University of Chicago cooperation in Water Sciences, and the steering committee for “BusinessH2O – Water management best practices from USA and Israel”.

=== Research ===
Prof. Weisbrod has supervised more than 50 graduate students, and co-authored more than 110 scientific papers in the subject of Earth sciences and Environmental sciences. These include research in the following areas and subjects.

==== Subsurface flow and transport processes (emphasizing colloid and colloid-facilitated transport of contaminants) ====
Research involving the exploration of processes and mechanisms related to flow and transport phenomena in the subsurface and at the Earth-atmosphere interface, for example:

- New method for sampling groundwater colloids under natural gradient flow conditions.
- Light transmission technique for the evaluation of colloidal transport and dynamics in porous media.
- Impact of particle size on colloid transport in discrete fracture.
- Colloid transport through saturated sand columns and the influence of physical and chemical surface properties on deposition.
- Colloid-facilitated transport of lead in natural discrete fractures.

==== Fractures and discontinuities ====
The role of surface-exposed fractures in groundwater salinization and earth-atmosphere gas exchanges and the role of fractures and other discontinuities within the Earth's surface, items which fundamentally impact the Earth-atmosphere interaction, for example:

- The role of fractures in Earth-atmosphere gas exchange.
- The cause and effect pathways of atmospheric winds and fracture ventilation.

==== Soil evaporation ====
Soil evaporation and the impact of various soil and atmospheric conditions on this process, including the links between soil evaporation and salinization, for example:

- The use of fluorescent dyes as tracers in highly saline groundwater.
- Combined evaporation and salt precipitation in homogeneous and heterogeneous porous media.

==== Contaminants ====
The transport of contaminants (salts, VOC's, perchlorate, Cr, explosives, pesticides, radionuclides and pharmaceutical waste) below industrial zones and non-point source pollution (mainly agriculture). These include the issues surrounding in situ bioremediation and the transport mechanisms of various contaminants, for example:

- Impact of intermittent rainwater and wastewater flow on coated and uncoated fractures in chalk.
- Accumulation of oil and grease in soils irrigated with greywater and their potential role in soil water repellency.
- Steady-state homogeneous approximations of vertical velocity from EC profiles.
- Isotopic evidence and quantification assessment of in situ RDX biodegradation in the deep unsaturated zone.
- Observations on vertical variability in groundwater quality and the implications for aquifer management.
- Decentralized wetland-based treatment of oil-rich farm wastewater for reuse in an arid environment.
- Modeling the impact of solute recycling on groundwater salinization under irrigated lands, involving a study of the Alto Piura aquifer in Peru.

==== Salt and fresh water ====
Subsurface processes along the Dead-Sea shore, including the influences of salt and fresh-water, for example:

- Line-source multi-tracer test for assessing high groundwater velocity.
- Colloid transport in porous media and the impact of hyper-saline solutions.
- Dynamic dissolution of halite rock during flow of diluted saline solutions.

==== Rural water access and development ====
Problems involving rural water access and development, for example:

- Adapting enzyme-based microbial water quality analysis to remote areas in low-income countries.
