= Avigad Vonshak =

- אביגד וונשאק
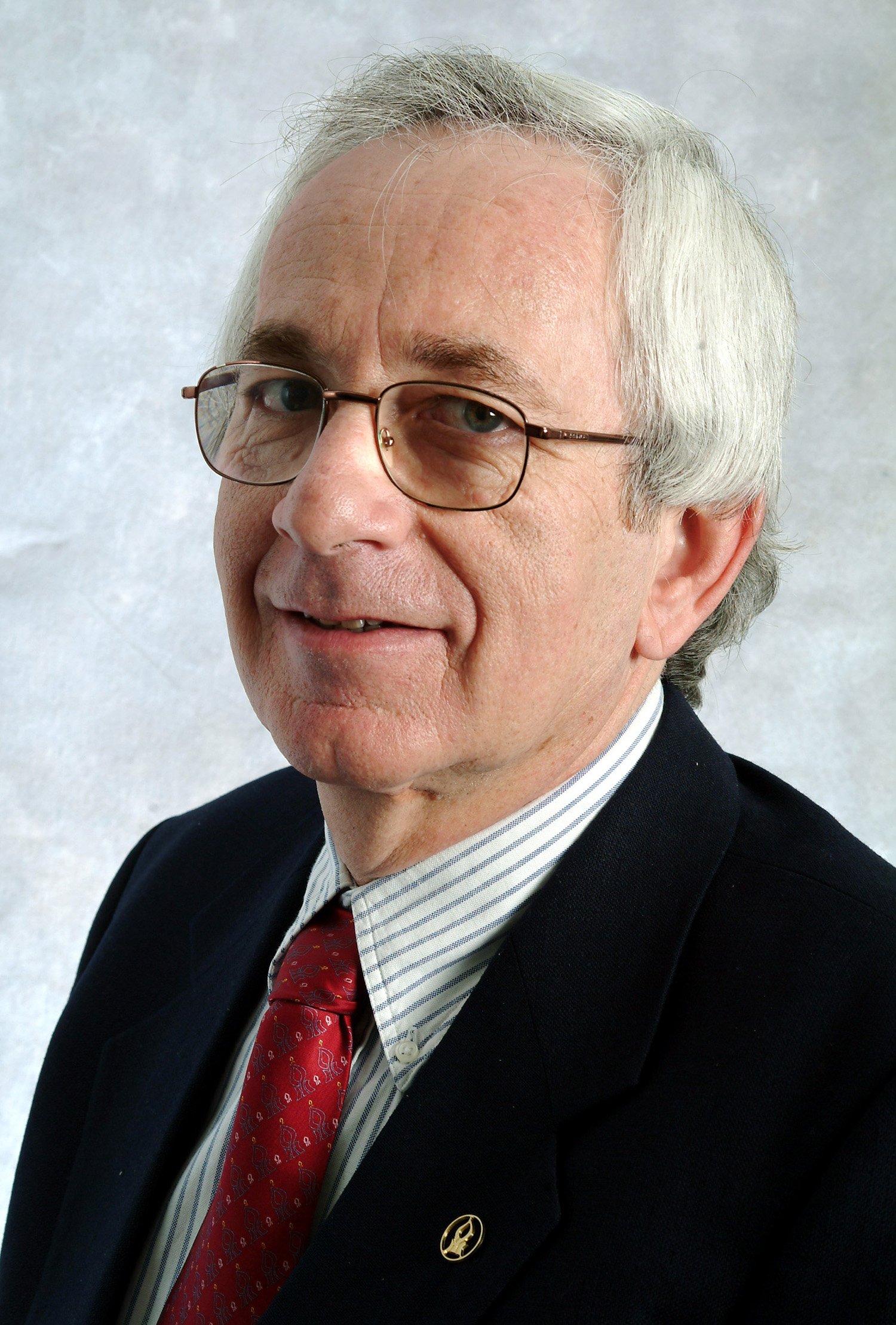
- Avigad Vonshak
- Born: 12 April 1947 (age 79); Germany
- Education: Ben-Gurion University of the Negev
- Scientific career
- Fields: Microalgae
- Workplaces: Ben-Gurion University of the Negev
- Doctoral advisor: Amos Richmond

Avigad Vonshak (Hebrew: אביגד וונשאק) is a professor emeritus at the French Associates Institute for Agriculture and Biotechnology of Drylands at the Jacob Blaustein Institutes for Desert Research at Ben-Gurion University of the Negev, Israel.

== Biography ==
Vonshak was born in Germany in 1947 and immigrated to Israel with his parents in 1948. He received his PhD from Ben-Gurion University in 1980 and did his post-doctoral studies in the Plant Research Laboratory in Michigan State University. Upon his return to Israel he has joined the faculty of the Jacob Blaustein Institutes for Desert Research (BIDR) at Ben-Gurion University of the Negev as a member of the Algal Biotechnology lab.

In 1997 he was asked to establish the graduate school for Desert Studies. As such he served as the first director of the Albert Katz international school for Desert Studies (AKIS) (1998- 2003). He was nominated to be the director of the Jacob Blaustein Institutes for Desert Research BIDR (2002 -2010). At that time the BIDR was restructured to its current form, consisting of three research institutes, dealing with Agriculture and Biotechnology, Water research and Dryland Environment, with AKIS serving as the teaching arm of the BIDR.

He also had few other administrative roles in BGU including serving as the director of the Ben Gurion Research Institute for the Study of Israel and Zionism (2007–13) As well as Dean for international Academic affairs (2010–12).

His research interests include the study of environmental stress in algae. The main goal of these studies is to try to understand the mechanisms involved in the adaptation of dense algal cultures to the extreme environment existing in many drylands. Prof. Vonshak is known internationally mainly for his contribution to the development of the biotechnology for mass culturing of the blue-green algae (cyanobacteria) Spirulina under large-scale conditions. The concept was developed as part of the approach that sustainable development of drylands requires the need to develop new innovative biotechnologies that will make use of the environmental condition of drylands and increase the water use efficiency as compared to conventional agriculture methodologies.

Professor Vonshak served as president of the Asian Pacific Society for Applied Phycology. He has been involved in many international training programs organized by UNEP, UNESCO and other international agencies.

Professor Vonshak is involved in few activities outside of the university served as the director of the Ben-Gurion Heritage institute, he is the academic advisor for the Ramat-Negev International training center for Desert-Agriculture. He is also serving as a special advisor to the Bona-Terra charity foundation devoted to help farmers in the Negev and also serving in the advisory board to the Israeli national lottery “Mifal HaPayis”

== Research interests ==
Vonshak's work is trying to understand the different steps associated in the response of the photosynthetic apparatus and mainly PSII to an environmental stress.

The work so far points out that our original approach taken some 25 years ago of treating algal growth outdoors in terms of light limitation or a process governed by one main limiting factor was a naive attempt to simplify things. His findings point out that in many cases the system is down regulated or even photoinhibited not necessarily because of exposure to high light intensity but rather due to other environmental stress that reduce the photosynthetic activity be it temperature or salinity. As a result, the ability of the cells to utilize light by the photosynthetic machinery is reduced and thus light levels that are considered as harmless under optimal growth conditions are turning to be over-saturating levels and result in down regulating and photoinhibiting the photosynthetic apparatus.

== Books ==
- Vonshak, A. (Ed.) Spirulina platensis (Arthrospira): Physiology, Cell-biology and Biotechnology. Taylor & Francis, London UK, 1997, 233 pp.

== Selected articles ==
- Lu, C.-M., Rao, K., Hall, D. and Vonshak, A. Production of eicosapentaenoic acid (EPA) in Monodus subterraneus grown in a helical tubular photobioreactor as affected by cell density and light intensity. J. of Appl. Phycol.13: 517–522, 2001.
- Lu, C.-M. and Vonshak, A. Effects of salinity stress on Photosystem II function in cyanobacterial Spirulina platensis cells. Physiologia Plantarum, 114: 405–413, 2002.
- Bigogno, C.; Khozin-Goldberg, I.; Boussiba, S.; Vonshak, A.; Cohen, Z. (2002). "Lipid and fatty acid composition of the green alga Parietochloris incisa". Phytochemistry. 60 (5): 497–503. doi:10.1016/s0031-9422(02)00100-0. PMID 12052516.
- Torzillo, G.; Pushparaj, B.; Masojidek, J.; Vonshak, A. (2003). "Biological constrains in algal biotechnology". Biotechnology and Bioprocess Engineering. 8 (6): 338–348. doi:10.1007/bf02949277. S2CID 84581936.
- Vonshak, A; Novoplansky, N. (2008). "Acclimation to low temperature of two Arthrospira platensis ( Cyanobacteria ) strains involves down-regulation of PSII and improved resistance to photoinhibition". J. Phycol. 44 (4): 1071–1079. Bibcode:2008JPcgy..44.1071V. doi:10.1111/j.1529-8817.2008.00546.x. PMID 27041625. S2CID 25795383.
- Manandhar-Shrestha, K; Arad, S; Vonshak, A. DCMU-resistance mutation confers resistance to high salt stress in the red microalga Porphyridium sp (Rhodophyta). European J. of Phycol. 44: 339-346 2009.
- Fedoroff, N. V., Battisti, D. S., Beachy, R. N., Cooper, P. J. M., Fischhoff, D. A., Hodges, C. N., Knauf, V. C., Lobell, D., Mazur, B. J., Molden, D., Reynolds, M. P., Ronald, P. C., (Rosegrant, M. W., Sanchez, P. A., Vonshak, A., Zhu, J. -K. Radically Rethinking Agriculture for the 21st Century. SCIENCE 327: 833–834, 2010
- Chien, L-F.; Vonshak, A. (2011). "Enzymatic antioxidant response to low-temperature acclimation in the cyanobacterium Arthrospira platensis". Journal of Applied Phycology. 23 (5): 887–894. Bibcode:2011JAPco..23..887C. doi:10.1007/s10811-010-9607-6. S2CID 44046629.
- Vonshak, Avigad; Laorawat, Supat; Bunnag, Boosya; Tanticharoen, Morakot (2014). "The effect of light availability on the photosynthetic activity and productivity of outdoor cultures of Arthrospira platensis (Spirulina)". Journal of Applied Phycology. 26 (3): 1309–1315. Bibcode:2014JAPco..26.1309V. doi:10.1007/s10811-013-0133-1.
- Varshney, P; Mikulic, P; Vonshak, A; Beardall, J; Wangikar, PP (2015). "Extremophilic micro-algae and their potential contribution in biotechnology". Bioresour Technol. 184: 363–72. Bibcode:2015BiTec.184..363V. doi:10.1016/j.biortech.2014.11.040. PMID 25443670.
