= Midreshet Ben-Gurion =

Educational center in southern Israel

Midreshet Ben-Gurion: מִדְרֶשֶׁת בֶּן גּוּרְיוֹן (Hebrew); كلية بن غوريون (Arabic)
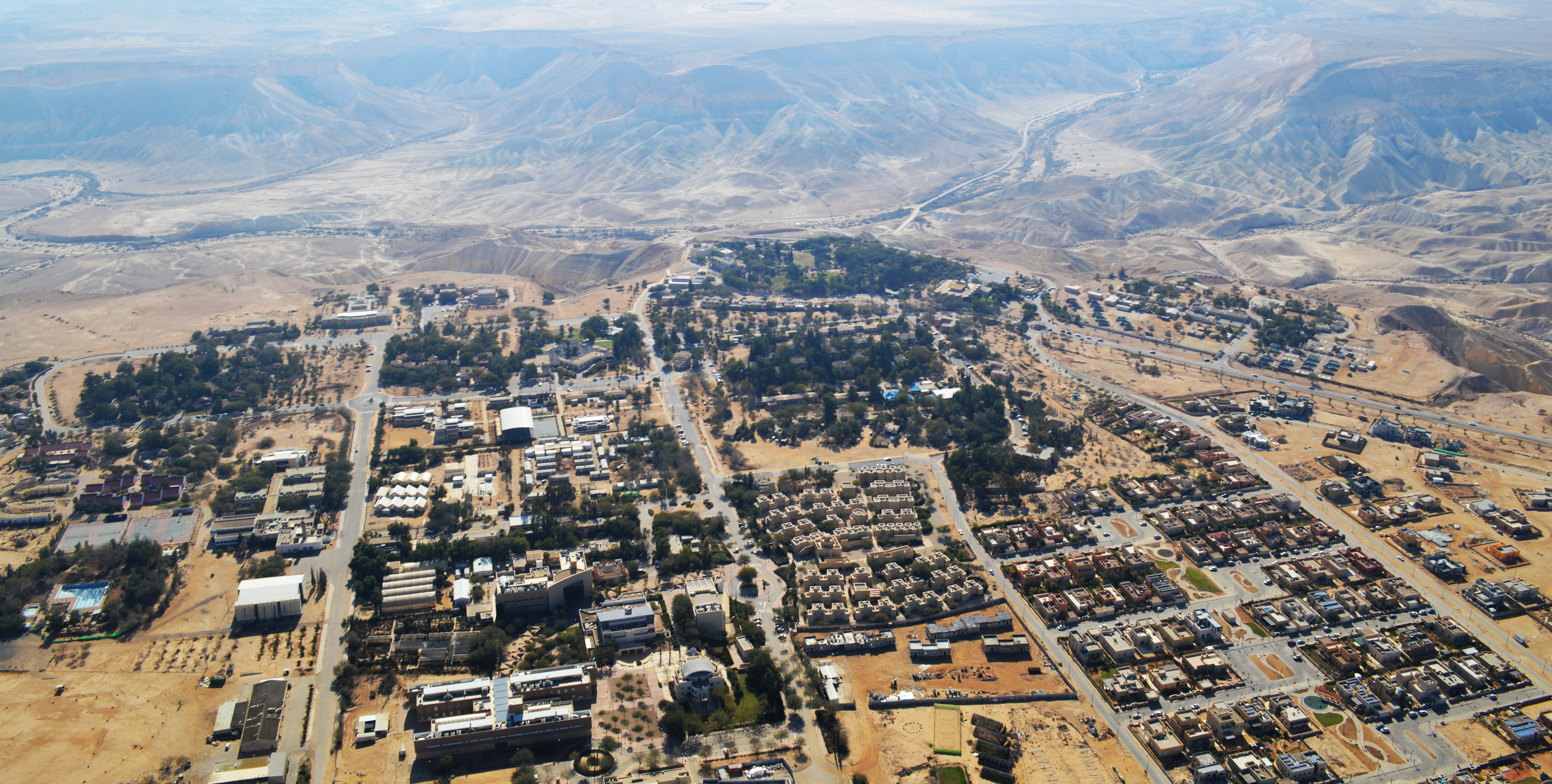

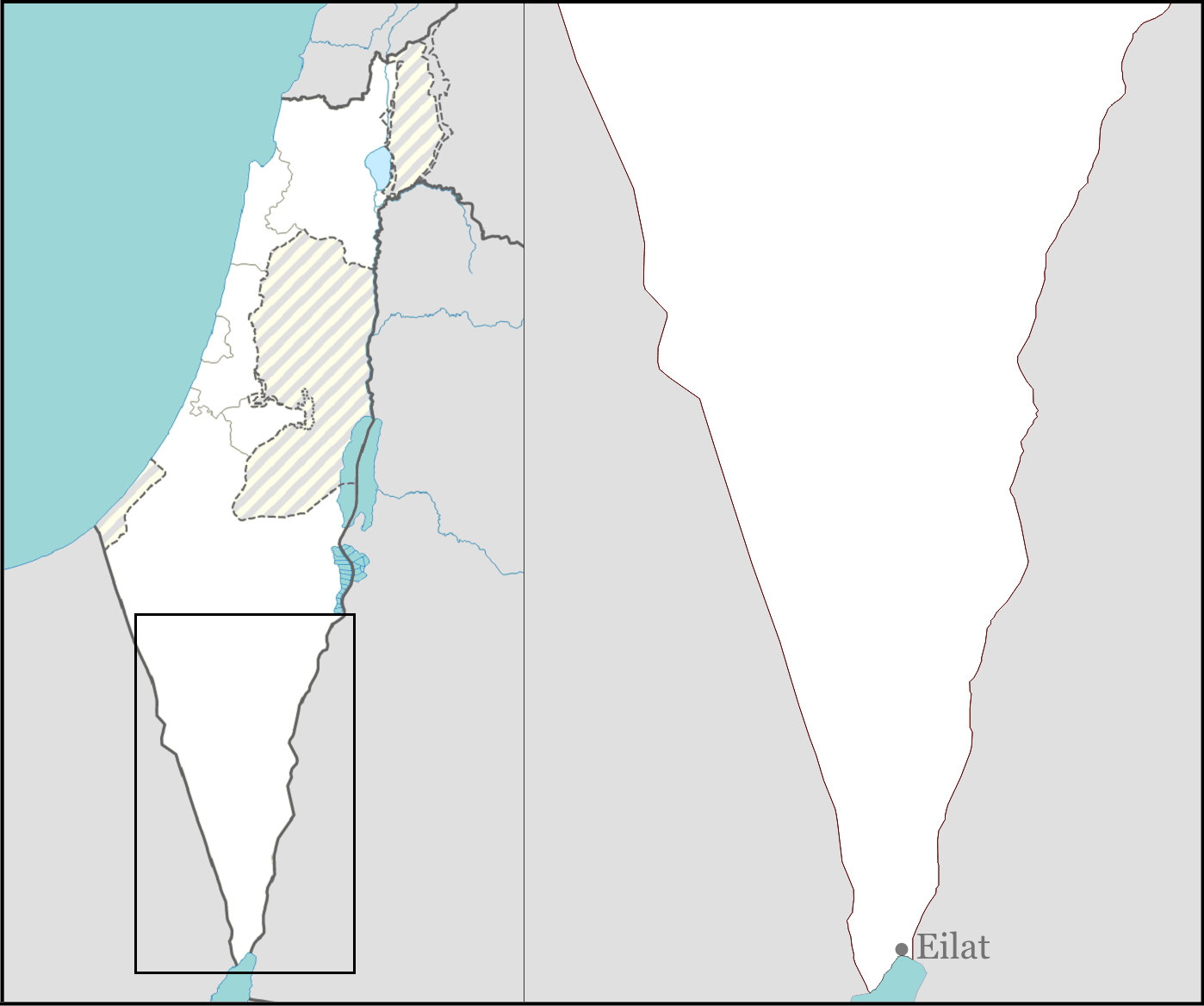
- Location within Southern Negev region of Israel Location within Israel
- Coordinates: 30°51′8″N 34°47′0″E
- Country: Israel
- District: Southern
- Subdistrict: Beersheba
- Council: Ramat HaNegev
- Founded: 1963
- Population (2024): 1,570

Midreshet Ben-Gurion (Hebrew: מִדְרֶשֶׁת בֶּן גּוּרְיוֹן), also known as Midreshet Sde Boker, is a community settlement and an educational center in southern Israel. Located in the Negev next to kibbutz Sde Boker, it falls under the jurisdiction of Ramat HaNegev Regional Council. In 2024 it had a population of 1,570.

== History ==
The construction of a field school began in 1962, inspired by David Ben-Gurion's vision of developing a thriving Jewish culture in the arid Negev. Ben Gurion envisioned the place to be a "Hebrew Oxford of the Negev".

The Jacob Blaustein Institutes for Desert Research, affiliated with Ben-Gurion University of the Negev, the Ben Gurion Heritage Institute, and a high school (with a boarding school) emphasizing environmental studies, are now located there.

Ben-Gurion and his wife Paula Ben-Gurion are buried nearby in the Ben-Gurion Tomb National Park on a cliff overlooking the Zin valley.

At the entrance to the Ben-Gurion Tomb National Park you can enter the Ein Avdat canyon.

== Solar energy research ==
The Jacob Blaustein Institutes for Desert Research has developed a solar energy research program focusing on how extremes of heat and cold in the desert can be mitigated through efficient storage of heat during the day for release at night.

An adobe house was built with rational fenestration, small windows in the northern side and heat collecting concrete prisms in the windows of the south facing wall. The prisms are situated in the rooms. They absorb heat during the day and can be rotated to allow the heat to discharge into the rooms at night. The "chimney" is part of an evaporative cooling system that maintains the temperature of the house during the day at bearable levels.

A double skin greenhouse uses copper sulfate solution as a heat screen during the day. The liquid is pumped between the two skins, protects the interior from ultraviolet rays and collects heat. At night the liquid is recirculated returning the heat to the greenhouse.

David Faiman of the Solar Center has made advancements in the realm of concentrator photovoltaics CPV. Faiman has produced a CPV unit capable of producing energy at a factor of up to a thousand more than conventional units.

== Agricultural and biotechnology research ==
Researchers at Midreshet Ben-Gurion have made breakthroughs in agriculture and biotechnology relevant to drylands and sustainable agriculture. The STRS1 and STRS2 genes, master controller genes in stress responses, discovered by Dr. Simon Barak and his students in 2006, helped to elucidate some of the more important genes involved with abiotic stress responses.

Avigad Vonshak, Director of the Institutes from 2002 to 2010, made headlines for his discovery, together with Prof. Sammy Boussiba (also of the institutes) of astaxanthin accumulation in green algae. Astaxanthin is an extremely valuable poly-unsaturated fatty acid (PUFA) which is valued for its use as a pigment, nutritional value, and possible use in bio-diesel.

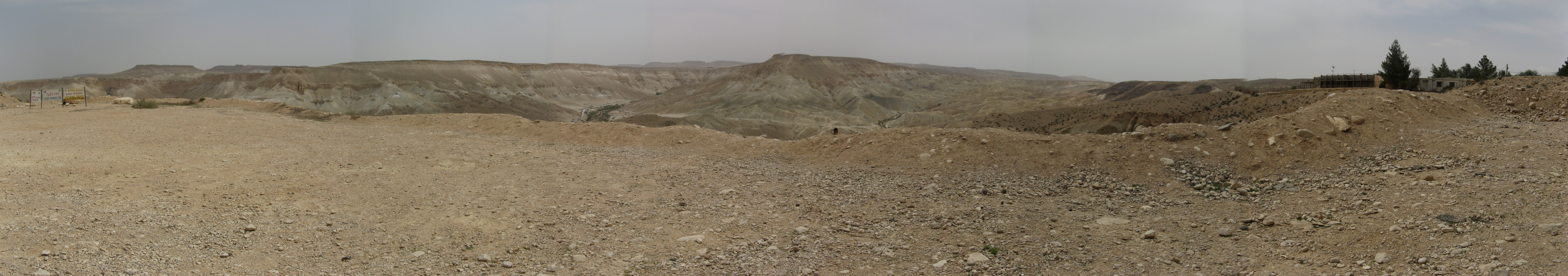
Panorama of Zin canyon from Midreshet Ben-Gurion on a rare cloudy day (most days are clear because of the arid climate)

== Notable residents ==
- Gannit Ankori

== Gallery ==
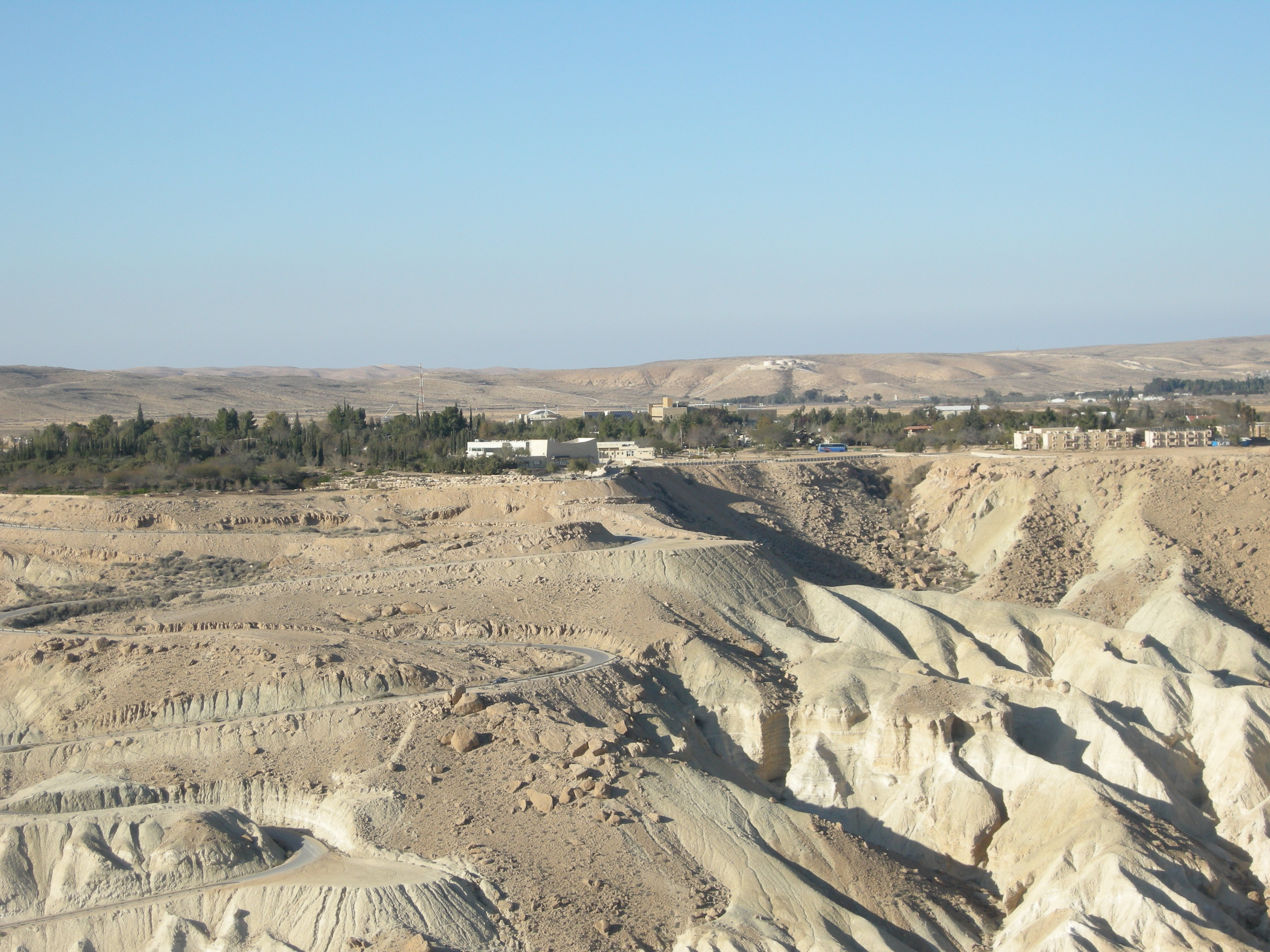

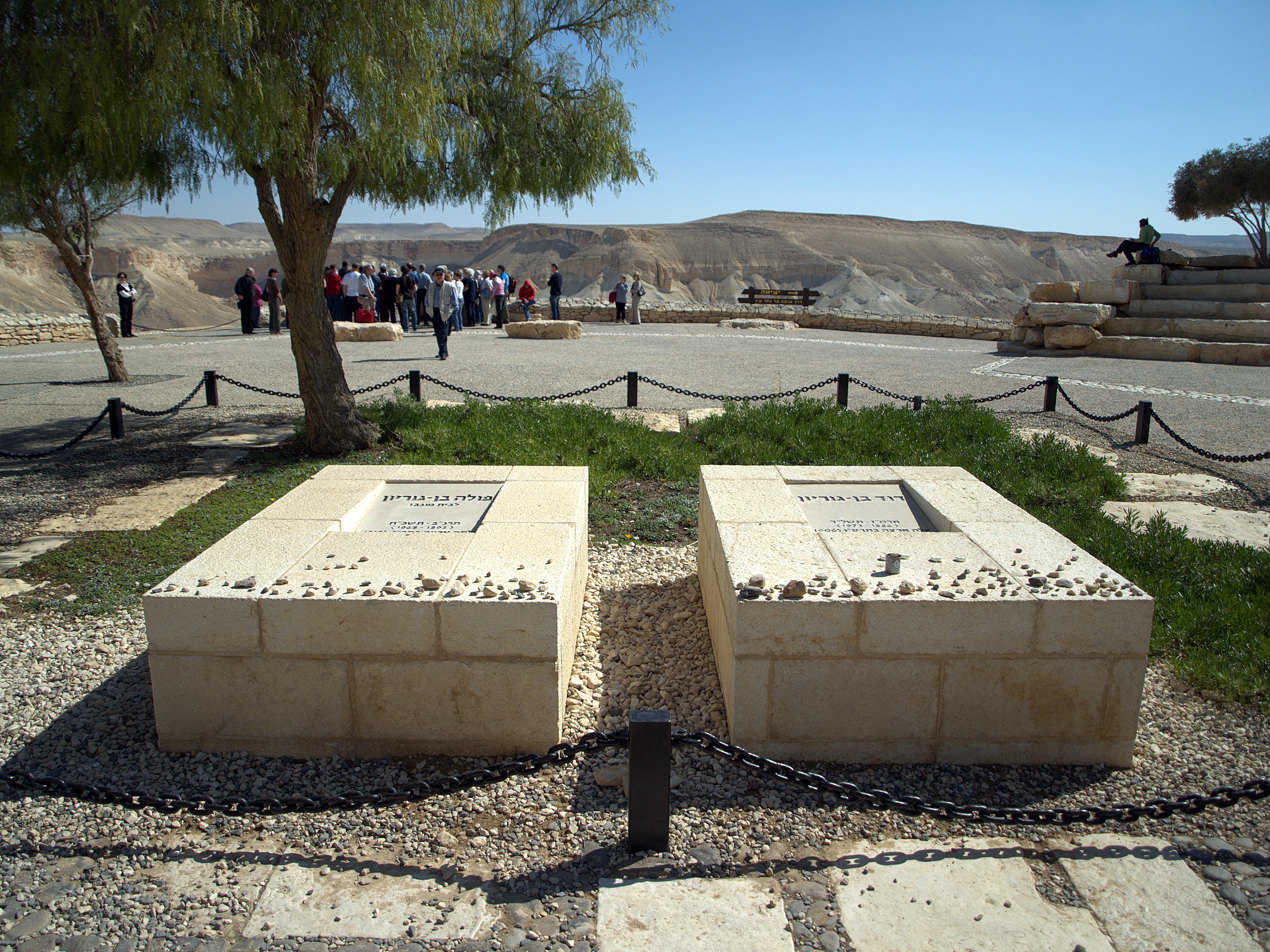
Graves of Paula and David Ben-Gurion

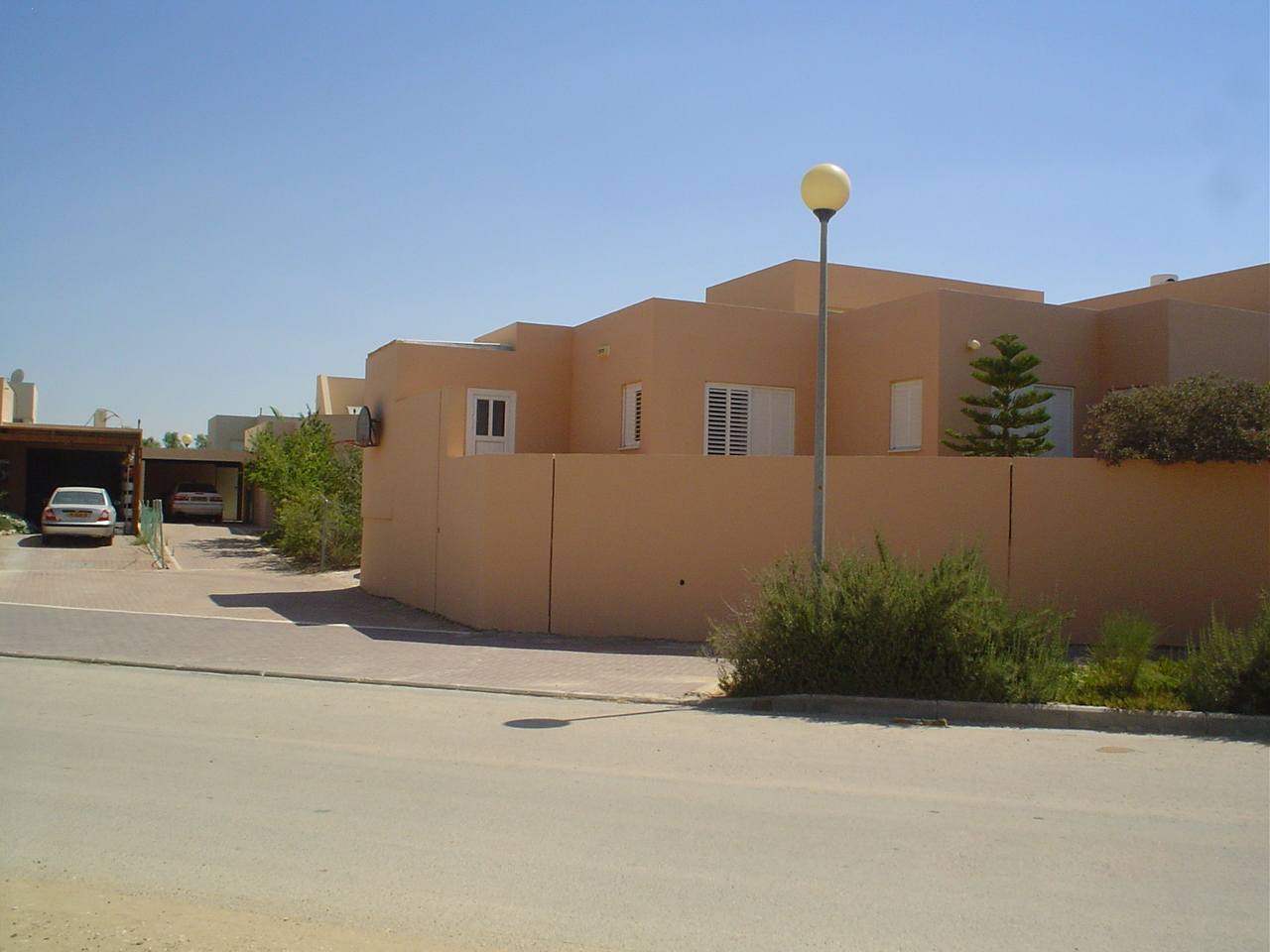
A typical home in Sde Boker

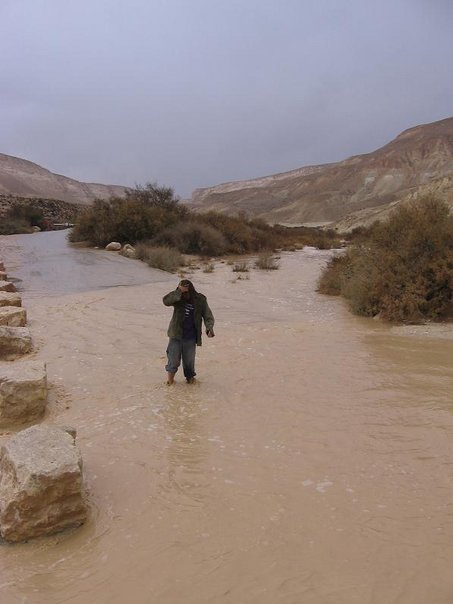
Flooding in Zin Valley below the Midrasha
