= Avigad =

Avigad is a surname. Notable people with the name include:

- Gad Avigad (born 1930), Israeli biochemist
- Jeremy Avigad (born 1968), American philosopher
- Nahman Avigad (1905–1992), Israeli archaeologist

== See also ==
- Avigad Vonshak (born 1947), Israeli biologist
