= Yosef Tekoah =

Israeli diplomat

Joseph Tekoah
- יוסף תקוע
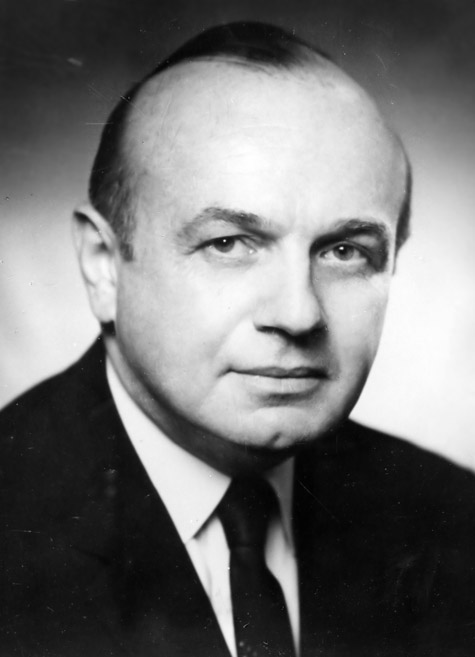

4th Permanent Representative of Israel to the United Nations
- In office 1968–1975
- Prime Minister: Levi Eshkol; Golda Meir; Yitzhak Rabin
- Preceded by: Gideon Rafael
- Succeeded by: Chaim Herzog

Personal details
- Born: Yosef Tukaczynsk; 4 March 1925 Lachowicze, Baranowicze County, Nowogródek Voivodeship, Second Polish Republic (now Belarus)
- Died: 14 April 1991 (aged 66) New York City, New York, U.S.
- Spouse: Ruth Tekoah
- Children: Gilad, Yoram and Michal Tekoah
- Occupation: diplomat and President of the Ben-Gurion University of the Negev

Yosef Tekoah (Hebrew: יוסף תקוע, romanized: Yosef Tekoah; 4 March 1925 – 14 April 1991) was a senior Israeli diplomat and the President of the Ben-Gurion University of the Negev (1975–1981). He was instrumental in the Israeli settlement in disputed DMZ territories with Syria, serving as one of David Ben-Gurion's favorite diplomats.

== Biography ==
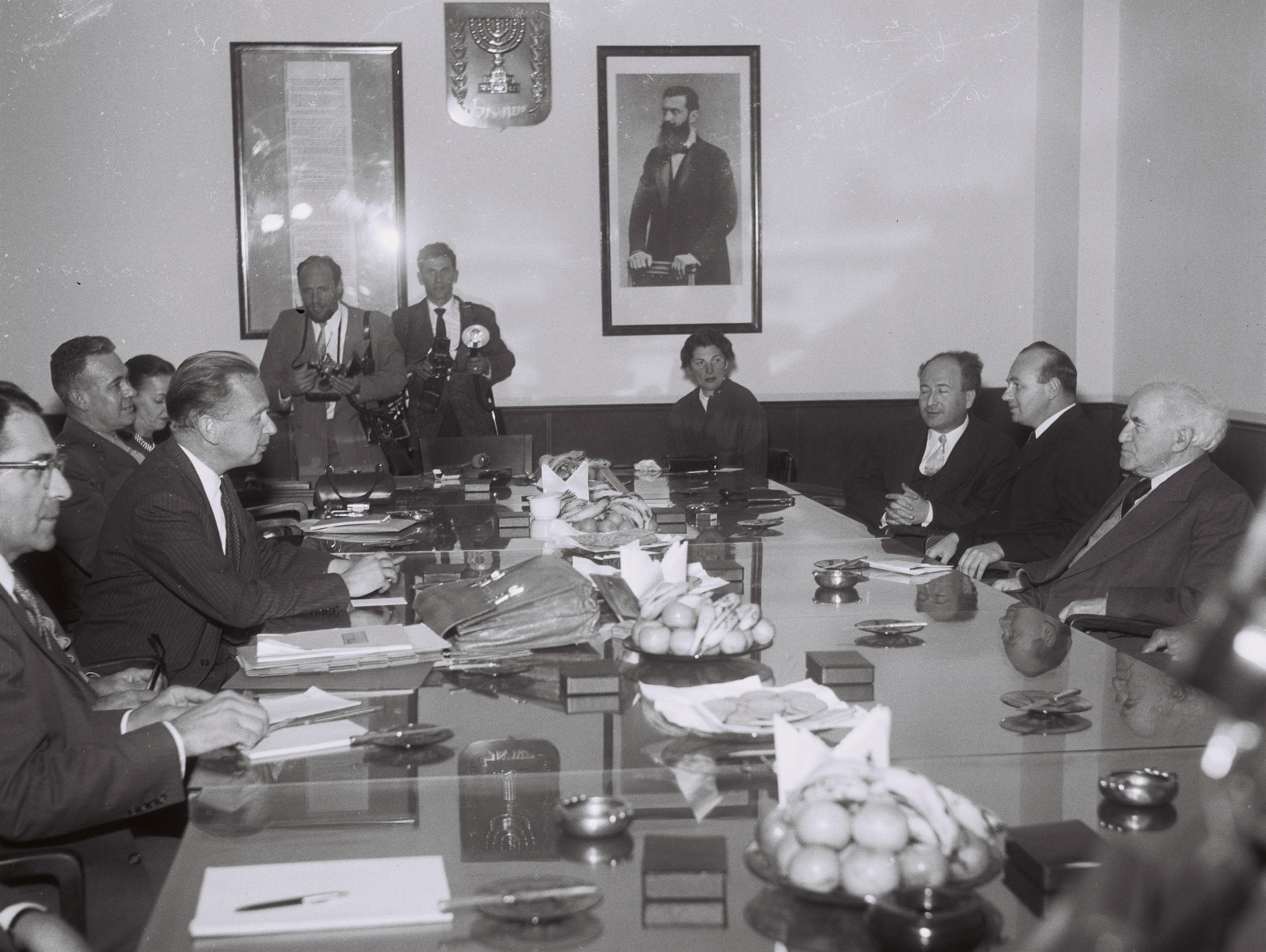
Dag Hammarskjöld, Israeli Prime Minister David Ben Gurion (R), Tekoah, and Eytan, Jerusalem, Israel (1957)

Tekoah was born in Lyakhavichy, Poland, as Yosef Tukaczynski. At the age of five he emigrated with his family to Harbin, due to the rise of Anti-Semitism in his homeland. Some time after the Fall of Harbin to the Imperial Japanese Army, Tekoah's family moved to Shanghai for financial purposes. He had a master’s degree in international relations from Harvard University, where he also taught, and a master's degree in natural and legal rights from Aurora University.

In 1948 he made Aliyah, changed his name to Tekoah and started working for the Ministry of Foreign Affairs, where he met his wife, Ruth Tekoah.

During his work in the Israeli Ministry of Foreign Affairs, Tekoah was appointed to several positions:

- The Israel Foreign Ministry legal adviser (1949–1953)
- Head of Armistice Affairs in the Israeli Ministry of Foreign Affairs (1954–1958)
- Deputy and Acting Head of the Israeli delegation to the UN (1958–1960)
- The Israeli Ambassador to Brazil (1960–1962)
- The Israeli Ambassador to the Soviet Union (1962–1965)
- VP of the Israeli Foreign Ministry (1965–1967)
- Permanent Representative of Israel to the United Nations (1968–1975)

He was the President of the Ben-Gurion University of the Negev from 1975 to 1981, following Moshe Prywes and succeeded by Shlomo Gazit.

Historian Avi Shlaim stated that he "could always be relied on [by Israel and the IDF] to produce legal arguments to justify even the most outrageous Israeli actions," and that "in his view the basic function of Israeli diplomacy was to service the country's security needs."

Tekoah died in 1991 in New York City after a heart attack.

Tekoah spoke fluent Hebrew, English, Russian, French, Portuguese, and Chinese.
