= Chaim Elata =

Israeli former university president

- חיים אילתה
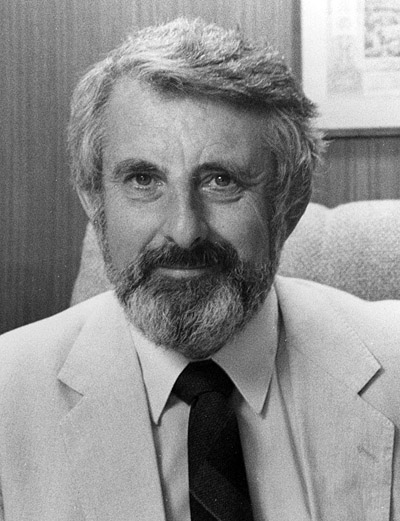
- Born: 1929 (age 96–97)
- Education: Technion Israel Institute of Technology (Master's Degree '57; Doctorate of Science '61)
- Occupation: Professor of mechanical engineering
- Known for: President of Ben-Gurion University of the Negev; Chairman of the Israel Public Utility Authority for Electricity

Chaim Elata (Hebrew: חיים אילתה) is an Israeli professor emeritus of mechanical engineering, and former president of Ben-Gurion University of the Negev. He is also the former chairman of the Israel Public Utility Authority for Electricity.

== Biography ==
When Elata was 13 years old and living in the Netherlands, the Nazis invaded. They took away his father and stepmother. Elata immigrated to Palestine in the late 1940s and worked as a kibbutz truck driver.

Elata graduated from the Technion Israel Institute of Technology, receiving a master's degree in 1957, and a Doctorate of Science in 1961. In 1973, he married Gerda Elata-Alster.

== Academic career ==
Elata is a professor emeritus of mechanical engineering, and former president of Ben-Gurion University of the Negev. In 1961 he became an associate professor at the Technion. He then joined Ben-Gurion University of the Negev in 1974 as the head of the Mechanical Engineering Department and the dean of the Faculty of Engineering Sciences. He left Ben-Gurion University for a short period of time in order to serve as the chief scientist for the Israeli Ministry of Energy and Infrastructure. In 1984 he returned to Ben-Gurion University to serve as Rector. He was then elected president in 1985, following Shlomo Gazit, serving until 1990 when he was succeeded by Avishay Braverman.

== Public positions ==
Elata was the head of the Israel Public Utility Authority for Electricity's administration from 1995 until 1996, and chairman of the authority from 1996 until 2001. He was the chief scientist of the Energy Ministry and founder of Hydronautics.
