= European Algae Biomass Association =

Association representing both research and industry in the field of algae technologies

European Algae Biomass Association (EABA)
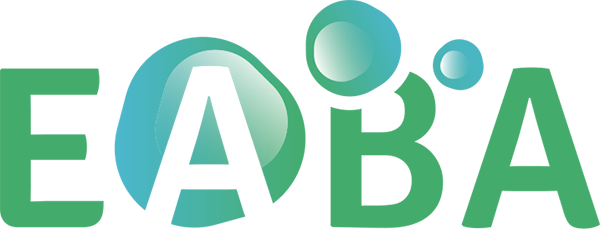
- Formation: 2009
- Purpose: Promote information exchange and cooperation in the algae sector.
- Headquarters: Florence, Italy
- Members: 210 members from 43 countries
- President: Carlos Unamunzaga
- General Manager: Vítor Verdelho
- Key people: Jean-Paul Cadoret (Vice President since 2022, President 2018-2022); Sammy Boussiba (Vice President since 2018); Gabriel Acien (Vice President since 2018); Lisandra Meinerz (Assistant Manager since 2017)
- Website: https://www.eaba-association.org/en

The European Algae Biomass Association (EABA) is a non-profit organization which gathers 200 academic and industrial stakeholders from the algae sector. Its goal is to promote mutual interchange and cooperation in the field of algal biomass production and use in numerous sectors (e.g., food, feed, cosmetics, agriculture). EABA organizes regular events such as webinars on a variety of topics and conferences. The organization was founded in September 2009 in Florence (Italy) during its inaugural conference at Villa La Pietra. As of 2022, EABA's President is Carlos Unamunzaga (Fitoplancton Marino S.L., Spain).

== History ==
The first President of EABA, Prof. Mario Tredici, served a 2-year term since his election on 2 June 2009. The EABA Vice Presidents were Claudio Rochietta, (Oxem, Italy), Prof. Patrick Sorgeloos (University of Ghent, Belgium), and Marc Van Aken (SBAE Industries, Belgium). The EABA Executive Director was Raffaello Garofalo. EABA had 58 founding members.

In 2018, the election occurred in Amsterdam on the 3rd of December. The EABA President was Mr. Jean-Paul Cadoret (Algama, France). The Vice Presidents were Prof. Sammy Boussiba (Ben-Gurion University of the Negev, Israel), Prof. Gabriel Acien (University of Almeria, Spain) and Dr. Alexandra Mosch (Germany). The EABA General Manager was Dr. Vítor Verdelho (A4F AlgaFuel, S.A., Portugal) and Prof. Mario Tredici (University of Florence, Italy) was elected as Honorary President.

The last election took place in Rome, on the 12th of December 2022. The newly elected President is Carlos Unamunzaga (Fitoplancton Marino S.L., Spain). The General Manager is Dr. Vítor Verdelho (A4F AlgaFuel, S.A., Portugal) and the Vice Presidents are Dr. Jean-Paul Cadoret (Algama, France), Prof. Sammy Boussiba (Ben-Gurion University of the Negev, Israel), and Prof. Gabriel Acien (University of Almeria, Spain).

EABA counts 210 academic and industrial members in 2023, coming from 43 different countries.

== Active roles & collaborations ==
=== New Algae For Food Forum ===
The New Algae For Food (NAFF) Forum is a platform focused on the establishment of a repository, including microalgae and macroalgae (seaweed), about “Algae consumption in Europe before 15 May 1997”. This Forum aims to identify and describe the algae species that can be used for human consumption and that are not included in the EU Novel Food catalogue.

=== AEU4Algae ===
EU4Algae is a European platform that promotes collaboration among European stakeholders in the algae sector, including algae “farmers”, producers, sellers, consumers, and technology developers as well as business-support organizations, investors, public authorities, academia, researchers, and NGOs. Seven working groups have been defined: “macroalgae production” (WG1), “microalgae production” (WG2), “algae for food” (WG3), “algae for feed” (WG4), “ecosystem services & bioremediation” (WG5), “materials, chemicals, bioactives & algae biorefining” (WG6), and “youth & entrepreneurship” (WG7).

=== Algae Biomass Organization ===
The partnership between EABA and the Algae Biomass Organization (ABO) has been initiated in 2019. ABO is a non-profit organization that promotes the development of viable commercial markets for renewable and sustainable algae-based products.
