= Moshe Prywes =

Polish-Israeli physician and educator

- משה פריבס
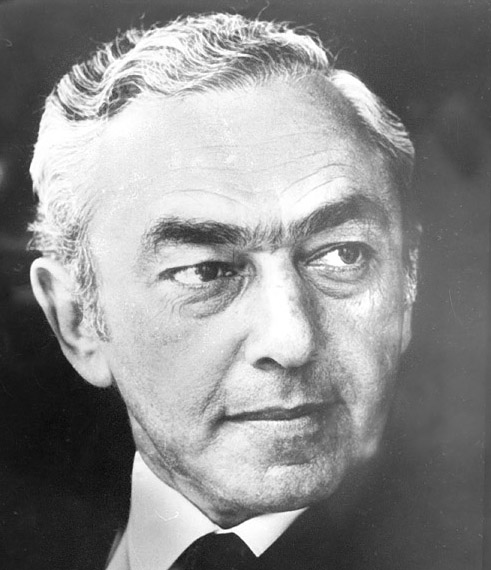
- Born: January 3, 1914; Warsaw, Poland
- Died: March 1998 (aged 84)
- Citizenship: Israel, Poland
- Education: University of Tours; University of Warsaw
- Known for: Physician and educator; first President of Ben-Gurion University of the Negev
- Notable work: Prisoner of Hope
- Awards: Knight of the French Legion of Honor; Israel Prize in Life Sciences

Moshe Prywes (Hebrew: משה פריבס; January 3, 1914 - March 1998) was a Polish-Israeli physician and educator. He was the first President of Ben-Gurion University of the Negev (1973-1975).

== Biography ==
Prywes was born in Warsaw, Poland. He studied medicine for two years at the University of Tours in France, and graduated from the University of Warsaw in 1939.

After the outbreak of World War II and the German invasion of Poland, Prywes was drafted into the Polish army as a physician-officer in 1939. He was taken captive by the Russians and sent to a labor camp in Siberia where he was kept from 1940 to 1945. From 1945–46, he was head of surgery in the Kherson hospital in Ukraine. Next, he became a chief assistant in the department of surgery, University Hospital, Gdańsk, Poland. He emigrated to France and from 1947-51 was director of the Œuvre de secours aux enfants (OSE) Jewish Health Organization in Paris. In 1962 he was awarded a Knight of the French Legion of Honor.

In 1951 Prywes immigrated to Israel, joined the Hebrew University faculty in Jerusalem, and was one of the founders of the medical school, where he served as a Dean of secondary education and Head of the Department of Medical Education. When Ben-Gurion University was founded in the Negev, he served as its first president from 1973 to 1975, succeeded by Yosef Tekoah. In 1973 he established a medical school, the Center of Health Services of the Ben Gurion University of the Negev, where medical studies were combined with the treatment of community clinics at all stages of the study. He was the first Dean of the school.

In 1990 he was awarded the Israel Prize in Life Sciences. After retiring from work in Beersheba, Prywes returned to Jerusalem and served until his death as editor of the English medical journal Israel Journal of Medical Sciences. He was a member of the World Health Organization (WHO). In 1995, he was awarded the Ben-Gurion Foundation's Ben Gurion Prize.

Prywes published his autobiography Prisoner of Hope in English in 1996. He was married to dentist Isabelle Priwes who died in 1965 and later to nurse Raquela Levy Brzezinski Prywes who died in 1985.
