= Electricity Authority (Israel) =

Israel Public Utility Authority for Electricity
Agency overview
- Formed: 1996
- Agency executive: Dr. Assaf Eilat, Chairman
- Website: pua.gov.il

The Israel Public Utility Authority for Electricity is a government authority charged with providing utility services, setting tariffs, regulation, and oversight of the electricity market in Israel. Established in 1996, the Authority came into existence concurrently with the expiration of the 70-year-old concession of the Israel Electric Corporation (IEC), and pursuant to the Electricity Market Law of 1996. Its formation marked a significant shift in the regulation and oversight of electricity provision in Israel, transitioning from a system where the Electric Corporation itself managed various regulatory roles to an independent regulatory body.

The Authority's primary responsibilities include the regulation and oversight of public utilities in the electricity sector, ensuring a balance of interests between consumers, the Electric Corporation, private electricity manufacturers, and the state. It plays a crucial role in setting electricity tariffs, promoting renewable energy, and encouraging private power production. The Electricity Authority operates under the guidelines established by the Electricity Market Law, which defines its powers, tasks, composition, and manner of operation.

In addition to setting tariffs, the Authority is responsible for establishing standards for the quality and nature of services provided by various entities in the electricity market, overseeing cost monitoring for the Electric Corporation, and issuing licenses to operate within the market. The Authority also sets economic arrangements for license holders and private entrepreneurs, promoting competition and streamlining consumption in the electricity market.

== History ==
The Authority was established in 1996, concurrent with the expiration of the 70-year-old concession of the Israel Electric Corporation (IEC), and pursuant to the Electricity Market Law of 1996. Prior to the establishment of the Electricity Authority, the Electric Corporation itself operated vis-a-vis the government of Israel in various fields related to regulation of the electricity system in Israel, such as the initiation of the construction of new power plants. The powers and tasks of the Authority, as well as the composition of the Authority's members and its manner of operation are defined in and based on the Electricity Market Law. The Electricity Authority serves as an independent professional regulator in matters concerning the electricity market in Israel, and is responsible for the regulation and oversight of the provision of public utilities in the field of electricity in Israel. The Authority is obligated to maintain a balance of interests between consumers, the Electric Corporation, electricity manufacturers, and the state. Part of the role of the Electricity Authority is the setting of the electricity tariffs in Israel, and the implementation of Israeli government decisions which have set a required level of power production by private producers and by renewable energy, through the encouragement and regulation of private power producers and producers of electricity from renewable energies, alongside the Electric Corporation.

== Areas of Responsibility ==
- Setting electricity tariffs and the methods of updating them.
- Setting required standards for the level, nature and quality of the service provided by the various entities operating in the electricity market to consumers, and overseeing the fulfillment of these duties according to measures set by the Authority.
- Conducting cost monitoring for the Electric Corporation, for the purpose of setting the components of the tariff.
- Issuing licenses to operate in the electricity market, and overseeing the fulfillment of conditions set in the licenses.
- Setting economic arrangements for license holders and private entrepreneurship in the electricity market vis-a-vis the Electric Corporation.
- Setting economic arrangements for the promotion and activities of renewable energy power producers.
- Promotion of arrangements for the management and streamlining of consumption.
- Checking consumer complaints against service providers and ruling on them.
- Minimizing costs in the electricity market.
- Creating conditions for competition in the electricity market.

== Management ==
The Chairperson of the Authority is appointed by the government for a term of five years, with the possibility of an additional four-year extension. As of 2016, the Authority was headed by Dr. Assaf Eilat.

=== Chairpersons ===
Name	Term Began	Term Ended
Prof. Chaim Elata	July 1, 1995	October 31, 2001
Emg. David Asus	August 19, 2001	December 31, 2006
Emg. Amnon Shpira	September 11, 2006	April 10, 2012
Orit Farkash-Hacohen	September 26, 2011	December 31, 2015
Dr. Assaf Eilat	May 8, 2016	

== Departments ==
=== Regulation Department ===
This department is charged with creating the standards and tariffs for the various service providers in the electricity market. The activity of the department focuses on promoting renewable energy facilities on one hand, and on examining the effects and indirect financial costs of the emission of pollutants from power plants that use fuels to produce power, to subsidize renewable-energy-based producers through setting premiums for non-pollution in conjunction with the Ministry of Environmental Protection on the other

=== Financing and Risk Management Department ===
This department works to guarantee the financial resilience of electricity producers in Israel through consolidating models and parameters for the setting and updating of financing costs and the proper return on equity capital of electricity producers, which is expressed through the various electricity rates, based on financial models and future scenarios. The department examines the effect of extreme scenarios on the profitability and financial resilience of the vital utility provider and the private electricity producers and monitors their financing costs and risks. The department also acts to consolidate financing-supporting regulations and standards and to deal with existing barriers to financing, and accompanies financial closing processes on behalf of the Authority.

=== Accounting and Monitoring Department ===
The department is charged with analyzing the financial reports of the power producers through matching the records to the rate structure set by the Authority, including the implementation of streamlining coefficients. This department initiates demand for special reports to the Authority to be used for cost oversight.

=== Licensing Department ===
The department is charged with issuing licenses for the operations of electricity producers, stands in continuous contact with license-seekers in the fields of production, conduction and distribution, advises the Authority assembly regarding the granting of licenses and oversees the fulfillment of their terms and conditions under law.

=== Economics and Logistics Department ===
The department's activities focus on monitoring and inspecting the financial activities of electricity providers. The department is charged with setting the structure and level of the rate and its means of update. The department performs pricing of other services offered by vital utility providers in accordance with the decisions of the Authority, and performs monitoring and oversight of the investment and development plans of the vital utility providers and their impact on the rate. In concert with other departments in the authority, the Economics Department inspects normative costs of the services that are set under various regulation and determined by the departments in the course of the ongoing work.

=== Engineering Department ===
The department is charged with the reliability and quality of the electric power supply, and gathers the amalgam of service-oriented aspect having to do with reliable supply and quality of electricity, including the area of connections, shortage policy, development policy at the execution level, self-initiated works, the issue of historical distributors, smart counting and smart grid. The department is also in charge of studying feasibility surveys and surveys of connecting private producers to the distribution and conduction grid.

=== Consumer Affairs and Public Inquiries Department ===
The department is charged with setting standards in the field of consumer affairs, and conducts monitoring and oversight upon the fulfillment of the standards through reports and field monitoring. The department is in charge of implementing the directives of the Freedom of Information Law. The Public Inquiries division within the department operates vis-a-vis the consumers and various consumer groups, as well as with other intra-governmental and external agencies regarding various consumer issues. The department examines consumer complaints against electricity providers and rules on them. Its rulings on cases are binding upon the electricity providers.

=== Strategy and Policy Monitoring Department ===
The Strategy and Policy Monitoring Department is charged with representing the Authority and coordinating its operations with senior outside government figures and figures in the business sector and in academia, developing and deepening the Authority's professional cooperation with comparable regulators in Israel and abroad, developing and consolidating the public policy, positioning and brand promotion for the Electricity Authority and setting the Authority's public relations policy. In addition the department is charged with the Authority's spokesman's apparatus.

=== Environmental Protection Department ===
The department's activity focuses on environmental consequences to operations in the electricity market, promotion of renewable energy policies, analyzing economic costs and the ways to integrate them. In the course of its work the department is in charge of contact with various environmentally-relevant entities in the market and accompanies the professional departments on these issues.

== See also ==
- Energy
- Economy of Israel
- Science and technology in Israel
