= Mordechai Gazit =

Israeli diplomat (1922–2016)

- מרדכי גזית
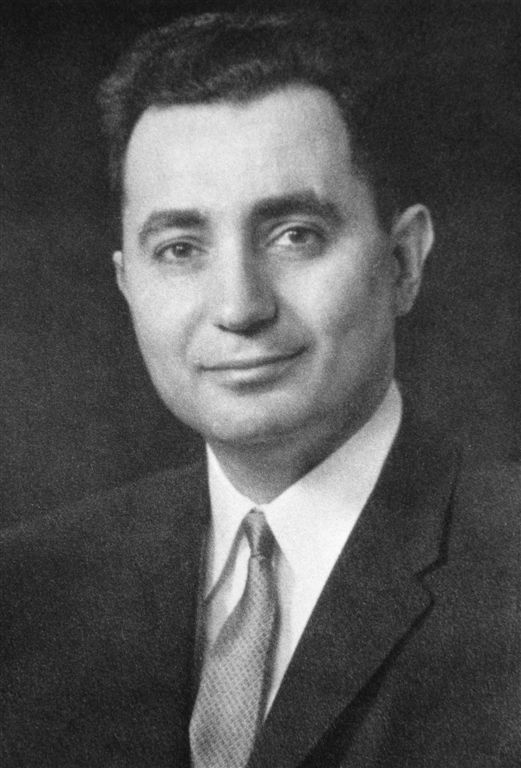
- Mordechai Gazit
- Born: Mordechai Weinstein; September 5, 1922; Istanbul, Turkey
- Died: May 29, 2016 (aged 93)
- Education: Hebrew University of Jerusalem
- Occupation: Diplomat
- Known for: Adviser to Prime Minister Golda Meir; Ambassador to France; Director-General of the Israeli Foreign Ministry
- Relatives: Shlomo Gazit (brother)

Mordechai Gazit (Hebrew: מרדכי גזית: September 5, 1922 - May 29, 2016) was an Israeli diplomat. He served as an adviser to Israeli Prime Minister Golda Meir, ambassador to France, and Director-General of the Israeli Foreign Ministry.

== Biography ==
Mordechai Weinstein (later Gazit) was born in Istanbul, Turkey to a family of Ukrainian Jews. His younger brother was Shlomo Gazit. The family immigrated to Palestine when he was a child.

At 14, he joined the Haganah, and completed an officer's course in 1943. In 1946, he was chosen to participate in the first class of the Institute of Advanced Studies, a diplomatic school set up by the Jewish Agency to train a generation of professional diplomats for the future Jewish state.

Gazit received a master's degree in archaeology from the Hebrew University of Jerusalem.

== Military career ==
During the 1947-48 Civil War in Mandatory Palestine, Gazit commanded a Haganah unit that was sent to hold Al-Qastal after its capture by Palmach commandos on April 3, 1948. During a lull in the fighting, a Haganah sentry under Gazit's command shot and killed Abd al-Qadir al-Husayni, the commander of the Army of the Holy War. Gazit personally examined the body and took his papers. Although Gazit's Haganah unit was later pushed out of Kastel by an Arab counterattack, Husayni's death had a devastating effect on Arab morale. He fought in the 1948 Arab-Israeli War as an intelligence officer and company commander in the Etzioni Brigade, participating in fighting in the Jerusalem area. He led an effort to resupply the besieged Jewish Quarter in Jerusalem's Old City, and was severely wounded in the fighting.

== Diplomatic career ==
In 1949, he joined the Israeli Foreign Ministry and was posted as a secretary at the Israeli Embassy in London. He later served in Rangoon, and in various senior positions within the Israeli Foreign Ministry. He was Deputy Director-General of the Immigrant Absorption Ministry from 1969 to 1970, and ambassador to France from 1976 to 1979.

Gazit rejected the argument that Israel missed an opportunity to make peace with Egypt from 1970 to 1973 after Anwar Sadat became Egypt's president. He also rejected the claim that Jordan's King Hussein warned Meir about the impending Arab attack on Israel in 1973.
