= Algal Research =

- Discipline: Phycology
- Language: English
- Edited by: J. A. Olivares

Publication details
- History: 2012-present
- Publisher: Elsevier
- Frequency: Bimonthly
- Impact factor: 5.014 (2014)

Standard abbreviations
- ISO 4: Algal Res.

Indexing
- CODEN: ARLEBJ
- ISSN: 2211-9264
- OCLC no.: 795553283

Links
- Journal homepage; Online archive

Algal Research is a bimonthly peer-reviewed scientific journal covering research on emerging technologies in algae biology, biomass production, cultivation, harvesting, extraction, bioproducts, and econometrics that was established in 2012. It is published by Elsevier and the editor-in-chief is J. A. Olivares (Los Alamos National Laboratory).

== Abstracting and indexing ==
The journal is abstracted and indexed in BIOSIS Previews, Current Contents/Agriculture, Biology & Environmental Sciences, Science Citation Index Expanded, and Scopus. According to the Journal Citation Reports, the journal has a 2014 impact factor of 5.014.
