= Shlomo Gazit =

Israeli military officer and academic (1926–2020)

- שלמה גזית
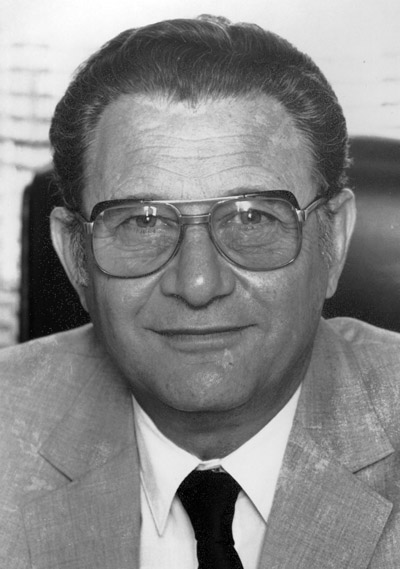
- Shlomo Gazit
- Born: Shlomo Weinstein; 26 October 1926; Istanbul, Turkey
- Died: 8 October 2020 (aged 93)
- Known for: Major General in the Israel Defense Forces; headed Israel's Military Intelligence Directorate; President of Ben-Gurion University; Director General of the Jewish Agency
- Relatives: Mordechai Gazit (brother)

Shlomo Gazit (Hebrew: שלמה גזית; 22 October 1926 – 8 October 2020) was an Israeli military officer and academic. A Major General in the Israel Defense Forces, he headed Israel's Military Intelligence Directorate. He later served as president of Ben-Gurion University and director general of the Jewish Agency.

== Biography ==
Shlomo Weinstein (later Gazit) was born in Istanbul, Turkey, to a Ukrainian Jewish family which later moved to Palestine. His older brother was Mordechai Gazit.

In 1942, while still in high school, he joined the Haganah, and the Palmach in 1944. He was assigned to Company H. He was initially based in Kiryat Anavim. He passed a commander's course and was appointed a platoon leader, serving in the Ramat HaKovesh and Givat HaShlosha areas. He participated in the Night of the Bridges and the Night of the Trains.

== Military career ==
During the 1948 Arab–Israeli War, Gazit served in the Harel Brigade, and initially took part in fighting the Arab Legion, participating in the Battles of Latrun. He later took part in Operation Yoav.

He served as the head of the assessment department in IDF intelligence before the Six-Day War, but then took leave to study for a master's degree in history. Gazit's studies were interrupted in the summer of 1967, when he was appointed by Defense Minister Moshe Dayan to be in charge of a committee tasked with running the political, security, and later economic affairs in the newly captured territories. This group would later be renamed "The Unit for the Coordination of Operations in the Territories".

After seven years, Gazit was promoted to head of the Military Intelligence Directorate, a position he held from 1974 to 1978.

== Academic and public career ==
Upon his retirement from the IDF, he served as president of the Ben Gurion University in Beersheba for two four-year terms, following Yosef Tekoah. In 1985, he was followed by President Chaim Elata. Since 1988 he was a member of the staff of Jaffee Center for Strategic Studies at the Tel Aviv University.

In 1985 Gazit was appointed director general of the Jewish Agency for Israel and served in this capacity till 1987.

== Published works ==
- The Middle East Military Balance, 1988-1989: A Comprehensive Data Base & In-Depth Analysis of Regional Strategic Issues, Westview Press, 1990. ISBN 0-8133-0961-1
- The Middle East Military Balance, 1990-91, Westview Press, 1992. ISBN 0-8133-1413-5
- The Middle East Military Balance 1992-1993, Westview Press, 1994. ISBN 0-8133-2218-9
- The Middle East Military Balance 1993-1994, Westview Press, 1995. ISBN 0-8133-2658-3
- The Palestinian refugee problem, Tel Aviv University, 1995. ISBN 965-459-016-6
- The Carrot and the Stick: Israel's Policy in Judaea and Samaria, 1967-68 , B'nai B'rith Book Service, 1995. ISBN 0-910250-29-4
- Trapped Fools; Thirty Years of Israeli Policy in the Territories, Frank Cass, 2003. ISBN 0-7146-8390-6
- The Arab-Israeli Wars: War and Peace in the Middle East, Vintage, 2005. ISBN 1-4000-7963-2
