= Albert Katz International School for Desert Studies =

Israeli graduate school

Coordinates: 30.853692°N 34.781251°E

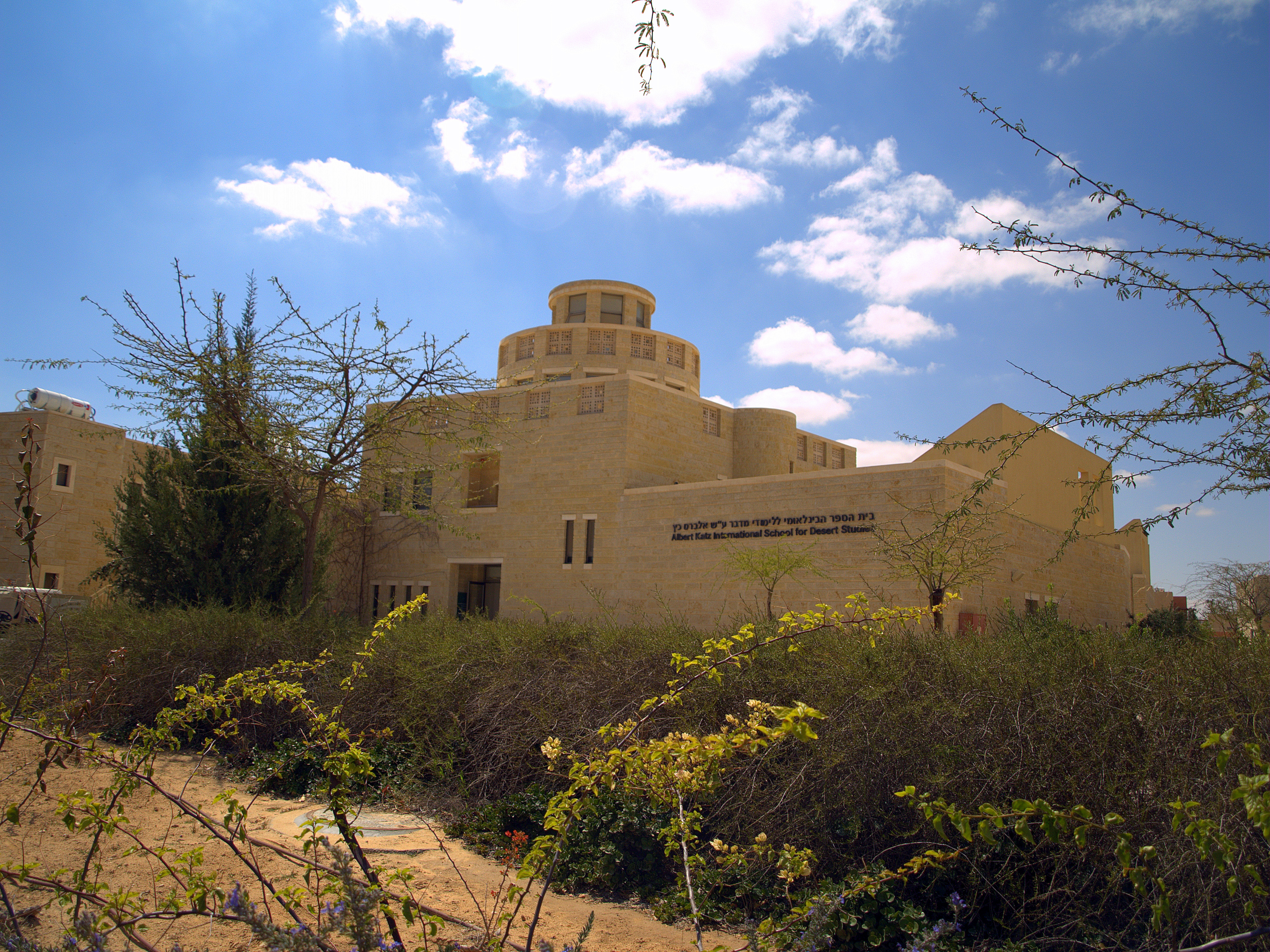
The International School for Desert Studies building.

The Albert Katz International School for Desert Studies (AKIS) is an international graduate school situated within the Jacob Blaustein Institutes for Desert Research, which is part of Ben-Gurion University of the Negev. It is located in Midreshet Ben-Gurion in the heart of the Negev Desert in Israel and was established in 1999.

The school offers four master's degree (MSc) programs: Desert Studies, Ecology and Nature Conservation, Hydrology and Water Quality, and Environmental Physics and Solar Energy. Students can also pursue a PhD degree in Desert Studies at AKIS under the framework of the Kreitman School of Advanced Studies at Ben-Gurion University of the Negev.

Approximately 230 students attend the school, and most live in student dormitories that were designed according to the principles of climate and energy-conscious architecture. The students at AKIS come from approximately 30 different countries around the world. All of the courses are taught in English by researchers from the Jacob Blaustein Institutes for Desert Research, from other faculties at Ben-Gurion University of the Negev, and, occasionally, by scholars from the international community.

== Programs ==
=== MSc in Desert Studies ===
This is a multidisciplinary program that is structured to provide an integrated approach, combining basic and applied research. The program offers the following tracks of study: 1. Agriculture and Biotechnology of Drylands, 2. Irrigation and the Plant Environment, and 3. Environmental and Aquatic Microbiology.

=== MSc in Hydrology and Water Quality ===
This program aims to introduce students to research in water sciences with the goal of improving human life in drylands and the development of policies for the sustainable use of water resources. The program offers the following tracks of study: 1. Water Resources, 2. Desalination and Water Treatment, and 3. Microbiology and Water Quality.

=== MSc in Ecology and Nature Conservation ===
This program is jointly coordinated with the Department of Life Sciences at Ben-Gurion University of the Negev and aims to provide students with a theoretical background in ecology and evolution, with an emphasis on biodiversity, community dynamics, and organism-level processes. The program offers the following tracks of study: 1. Evolutionary Ecology, and 2. Nature Conservation.

=== MSc in Environmental Physics and Solar Energy ===
This program, which launches in October 2021, is designed to train students in fields related to the environment and natural resources, with an emphasis on classical physics areas that are relevant to environmental studies, applied mathematics, and other physical-sciences-related fields. These areas include nonlinear dynamics, fluid flow, statistical methods, optics, and others.

=== PhD in Desert Studies ===
This program is offered under the framework of the Kreitman School of Advanced Studies at Ben-Gurion University of the Negev. It is a multidisciplinary degree that aims to train students in a combination of basic and applied research in order to pursue careers related to managing drylands and combatting desertification.
