= Jacob Blaustein Institutes for Desert Research =

Research institute in Ben-Gurion University

Coordinates: 30°51′14.97″N 34°46′56.92″E

The Jacob Blaustein Institutes for Desert Research
- Established: 1974
- Parent institution: Ben-Gurion University of the Negev
- Director: Noam Weisbrod
- Academic staff: 70
- Administrative staff: 90
- Students: 230
- Location: Midreshet Ben-Gurion, Israel

The Jacob Blaustein Institutes for Desert Research (BIDR) constitute one of the academic faculties of Ben-Gurion University of the Negev (BGU), and are located on BGU's Sede Boqer Campus in Midreshet Ben-Gurion in the heart of the Negev Desert in Israel. The BIDR is home to approximately 70 academic faculty and 90 technical and administrative staff members. In addition, 220 graduate students and 50 post-doctoral scholars, coming from over 30 different countries, study at the BIDR within the framework of the Albert Katz International School for Desert Studies. The BIDR comprises three internationally recognized research institutes: the Zuckerberg Institute for Water Research, the French Associates Institute for Agriculture and Biotechnology of Drylands, and the Swiss Institute for Dryland Environmental Research. The stated mission of the BIDR is to combat desertification and to explore global challenges by bringing together water, food, energy, and environmental research.

== History ==
In 1972, the Council for Higher Education in Israel recommended the establishment of a research institute to conduct scientific investigations of the country's southern Negev Desert. This recommendation was authorized by the Israeli government in 1973 and made manifest in 1974 with the founding of the Institute for Desert Research in Midreshet Ben-Gurion, located near Kibbutz Sede Boqer and approximately 50 kilometers south of Beersheva. Prof. Amos Richmond was appointed to be the first director of the institute. In 1976, the Institute for Desert Research was incorporated into Ben-Gurion University of the Negev. In 1980, following a generous donation from the Jacob and Hilda Blaustein Foundation to BGU, the institute was renamed the Jacob Blaustein Institute for Desert Research. In the early 21st century, the various research groups and academic departments were reorganized into three distinct, yet interrelated, research institutes: the Zuckerberg Institute for Water Research, the French Associates Institute for Agriculture and Biotechnology of Drylands, and the Swiss Institute for Dryland Environmental Research. The overarching institution has been known as the Jacob Blaustein Institutes for Desert Research, or the BIDR, ever since.

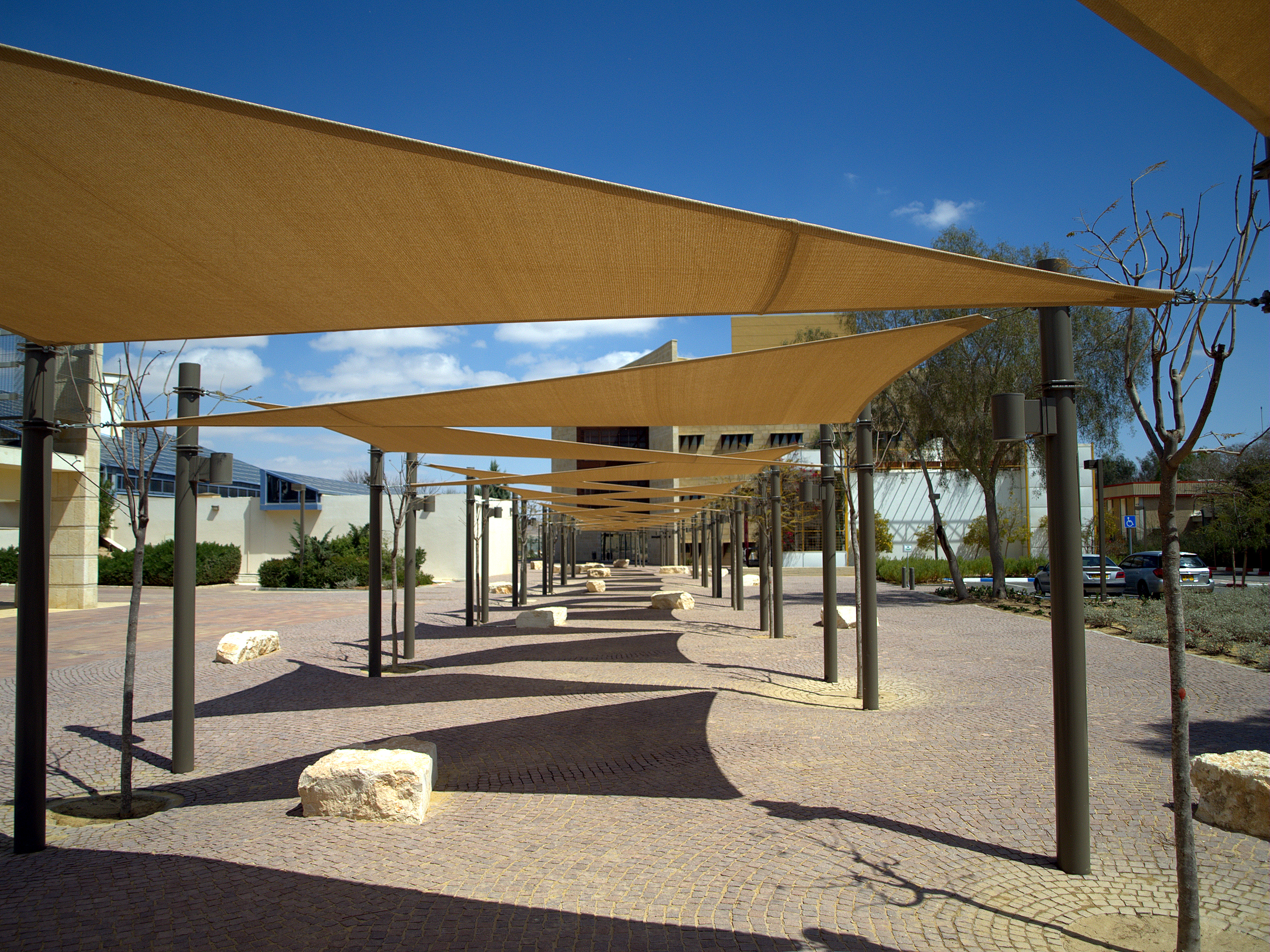
A shaded walkway on the campus.

== Academics ==
The Jacob Blaustein Institutes for Desert Research comprise three research institutes, an international graduate school offering master's and PhD degrees, and a center for international scientific cooperation.

=== The Zuckerberg Institute for Water Research ===
The Zuckerberg Institute for Water Research (ZIWR) is a multidisciplinary institute whose researchers focus on developing new technologies to provide drinking water and water for agricultural and industrial use and to promote the sustainable use of water resources. In its stated vision, the ZIWR aims to identify current and emerging fundamental and applied challenges in water-related developments, rehabilitation, and stewardship. Operating within the ZIWR are two departments: the Department of Environmental Hydrology and Microbiology and the Department of Desalination and Water Treatment.

=== The French Associates Institute for Agriculture and Biotechnology of Drylands ===
The French Associates Institute for Agriculture and Biotechnology of Drylands (FAAB) hosts researchers who carry out fundamental and applied research to develop sustainable agricultural solutions for increasing food production, particularly in arid areas where conventional methods of agriculture are difficult to practice. FAAB faculty focus on two main topics: 1. the soil-plant-atmosphere continuum in relation to environmental stress, and 2. aquaculture. The FAAB also hosts the Microalgal Biotechnology Laboratory whose researchers focus on microalgae as a reservoir of valuable bioactive compounds with numerous applications.

=== The Swiss Institute for Dryland Environmental and Energy Research ===
The Swiss Institute for Dryland Environmental and Energy Research (SIDEER) employs researchers who aim to develop, implement, and disseminate knowledge and environmental technologies in the fields of solar energy, environmental physics, and desert ecology. The SIDEER encompasses two departments: the Department of Solar Energy and Environmental Physics and the Department of Desert Ecology.

=== The Albert Katz International School for Desert Studies ===
The Albert Katz International School for Desert Studies (AKIS) is a graduate program offering master's and PhD degrees to Israeli and international students. Their program includes master's degrees in 1. desert studies, 2. hydrology and water quality, 3. ecology and nature conservation, and 4. environmental physics and solar energy. Students can also pursue a PhD degree at AKIS in desert studies under the aegis of the Kreitman School of Advanced Graduate Studies at Ben-Gurion University of the Negev.

=== The Jacob Blaustein Center for Scientific Cooperation ===
The collaborative scientific activities of the BIDR are coordinated through the Blaustein Center for Scientific Cooperation (BCSC). The center funds and promotes student exchange programs, postdoctoral training, international workshops and conferences, and joint research programs with academic institutions around the world. The BCSC offers postdoctoral fellowships for scholars who have recently attained their PhD degree and wish to carry out research at the BIDR.

== Gallery ==
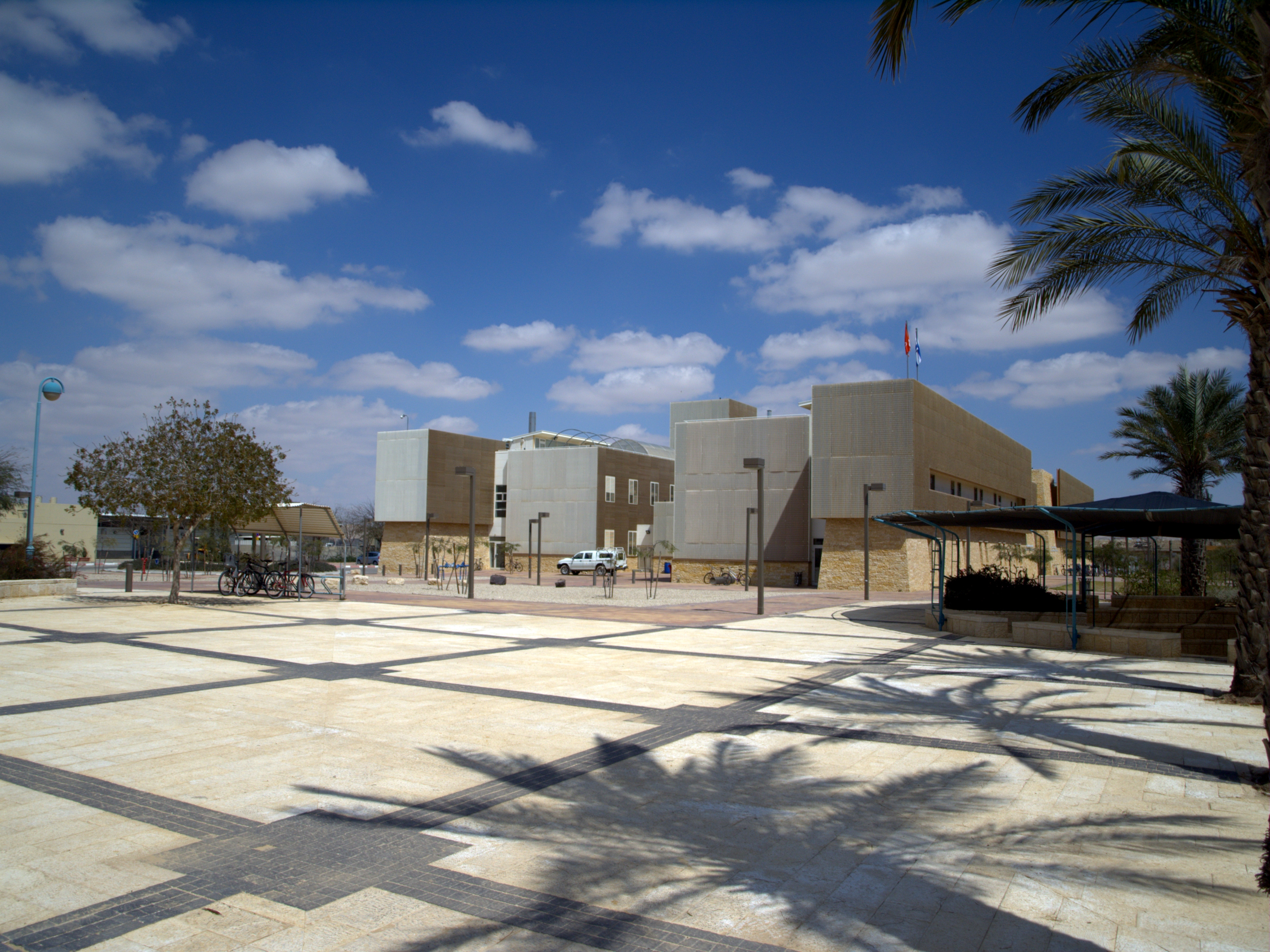
The campus

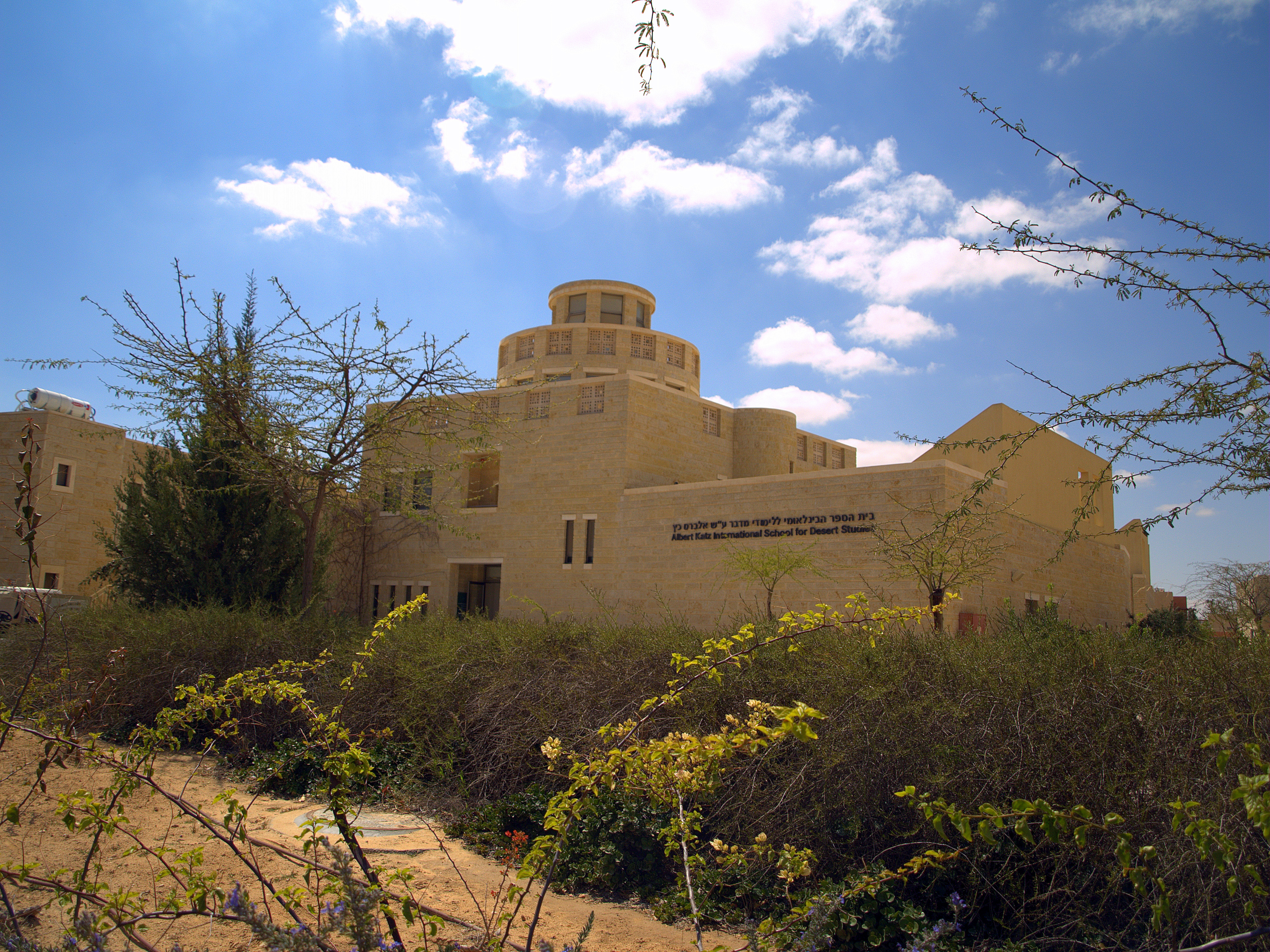
Albert Katz School Building

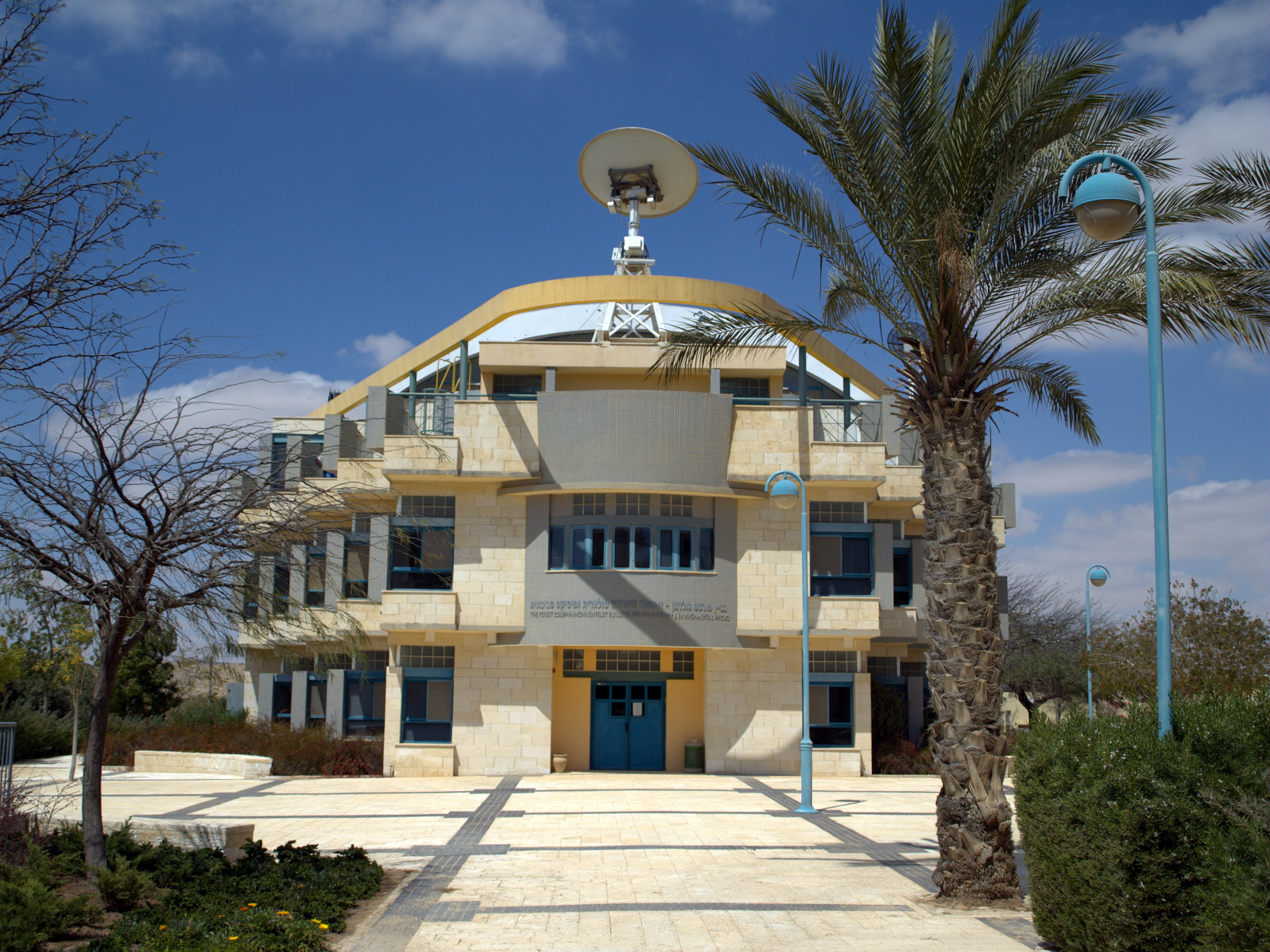
Solar and Environmental Physics building

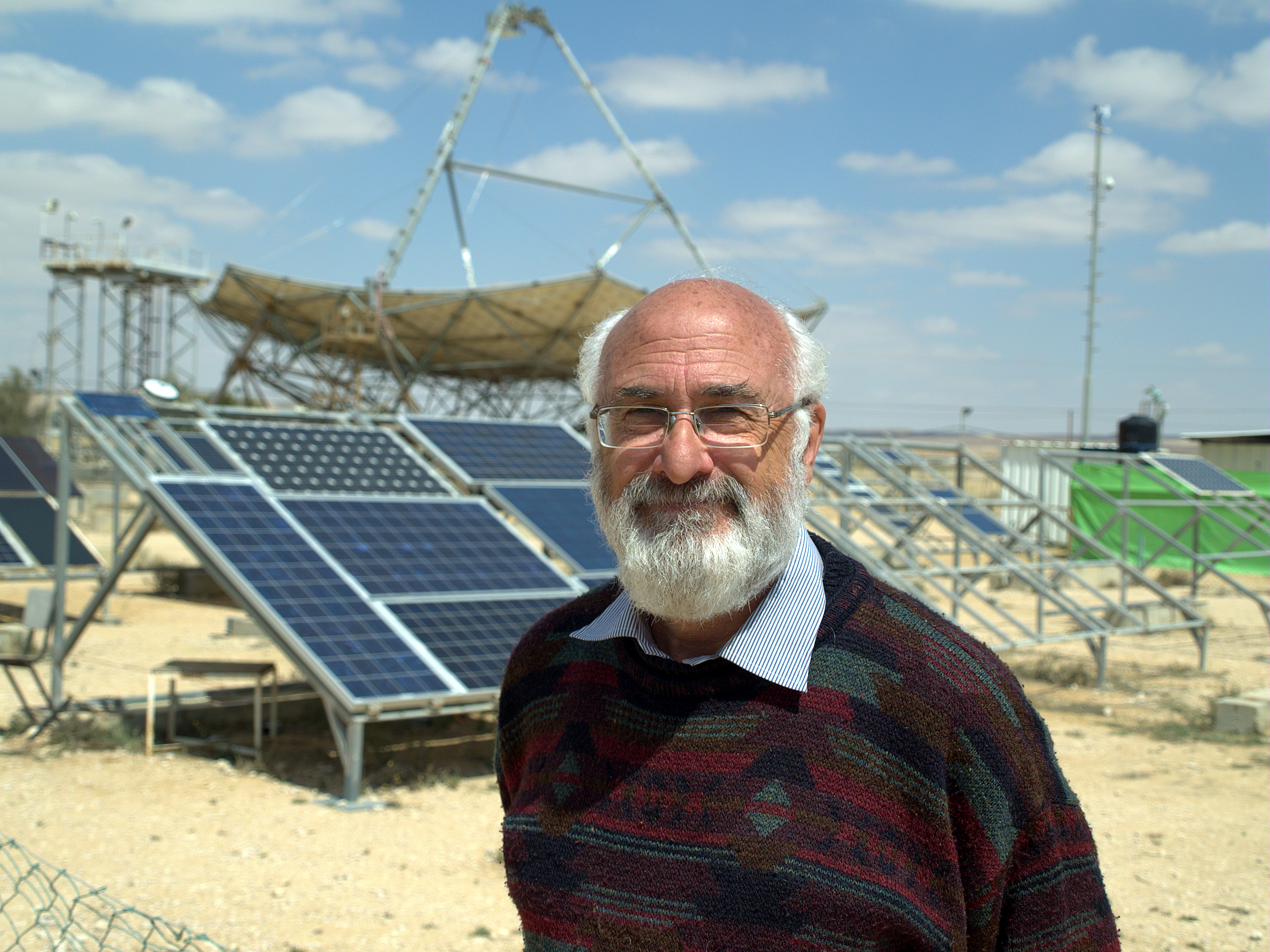
David Faiman

== See also ==
- Solar power in Israel
