= Ben-Gurion University of the Negev =

Public research university in Beersheba, Israel

- אוניברסיטת בן-גוריון בנגב (Hebrew)
- Former name: University of the Negev
- Motto: השראה פוגשת מצוינות (Hebrew)
- Motto in English: Inspiration Meets Excellence
- Type: Public
- Established: 1969
- Endowment: $925 million
- Budget: $466 million
- President: Daniel Chamovitz
- Rector: Chaim Hames
- Senior faculty: 873
- Administrative staff: 1,155
- Students: 18,357
- Undergraduates: 12,169
- Postgraduates: 4,292
- Doctoral students: 1,311
- Location: Beersheba, Sde Boker, and Eilat, Israel; 31°15′43.89″N 34°48′5.44″E
- Colors: Orange, Black, and White
- Website: www.bgu.ac.il/en/

Ben-Gurion University of the Negev (BGU; Hebrew: אוניברסיטת בן-גוריון בנגב, Universitat Ben-Guriyon baNegev) is a public research university in Beersheba, Israel. Named after Israeli national founder David Ben-Gurion, the university was founded in 1969 and currently has five campuses; three in Beersheba, one in Sede Boqer and one in Eilat.

Ben-Gurion University has about 20,000 students. Some of its research institutes include the National Institute for Biotechnology in the Negev, the Ilse Katz Institute for Nanoscale Science and Technology, the Jacob Blaustein Institutes for Desert Research with the Albert Katz International School for Desert Studies, and the Ben-Gurion Research Institute for the Study of Israel and Zionism.

== History ==
Ben-Gurion University was established in 1969 as the University of the Negev with the aim of promoting the development of the Negev desert, which comprises more than sixty percent of Israel. The university was later renamed after Israel's founder and first prime minister, David Ben-Gurion, who believed that the future of the country lay in this region. After Ben-Gurion's death in 1973, the university was renamed Ben-Gurion University of the Negev. Past presidents of the university include Moshe Prywes (1973–75), Yosef Tekoah (1975–81), Shlomo Gazit (1982–85), Chaim Elata (1985–90), Avishay Braverman (1990–2006), Rivka Carmi (2006–18), and Daniel Chamovitz (2019–present). The current Chairman of the Executive Council is Avi Nissenkorn.

In 2016, the late Dr. Howard and Lottie Marcus bequeathed approximately US$400 million to the university. This is the largest bequest ever made to an Israeli university and the most generous donation to any institution in the State of Israel. The funds doubled the university's existing endowment.

== Academics ==
=== University rankings ===
University rankings

Global – Overall
- ARWU World: 301-400 (2024)
- CWTS World: 317 (2024)
- QS World: =469 (2026)
- THE World: 501-600 (2025)
- USNWR Global: 546 (2025)

BGU has been ranked 320th in the world, 70th in Asia and 4th in Israel according to the 2016 QS World University Rankings. BGU also ranked 31st overall in the ranking of young universities according to the 2016 QS "Top 50 Under 50" and the only one in Israel to date. BGU is ranked between 101st and 150th overall in computer science according to the 2015 Academic Ranking of World Universities in Computer Science for four consecutive years.

=== Faculties, schools, research institutes and centers ===
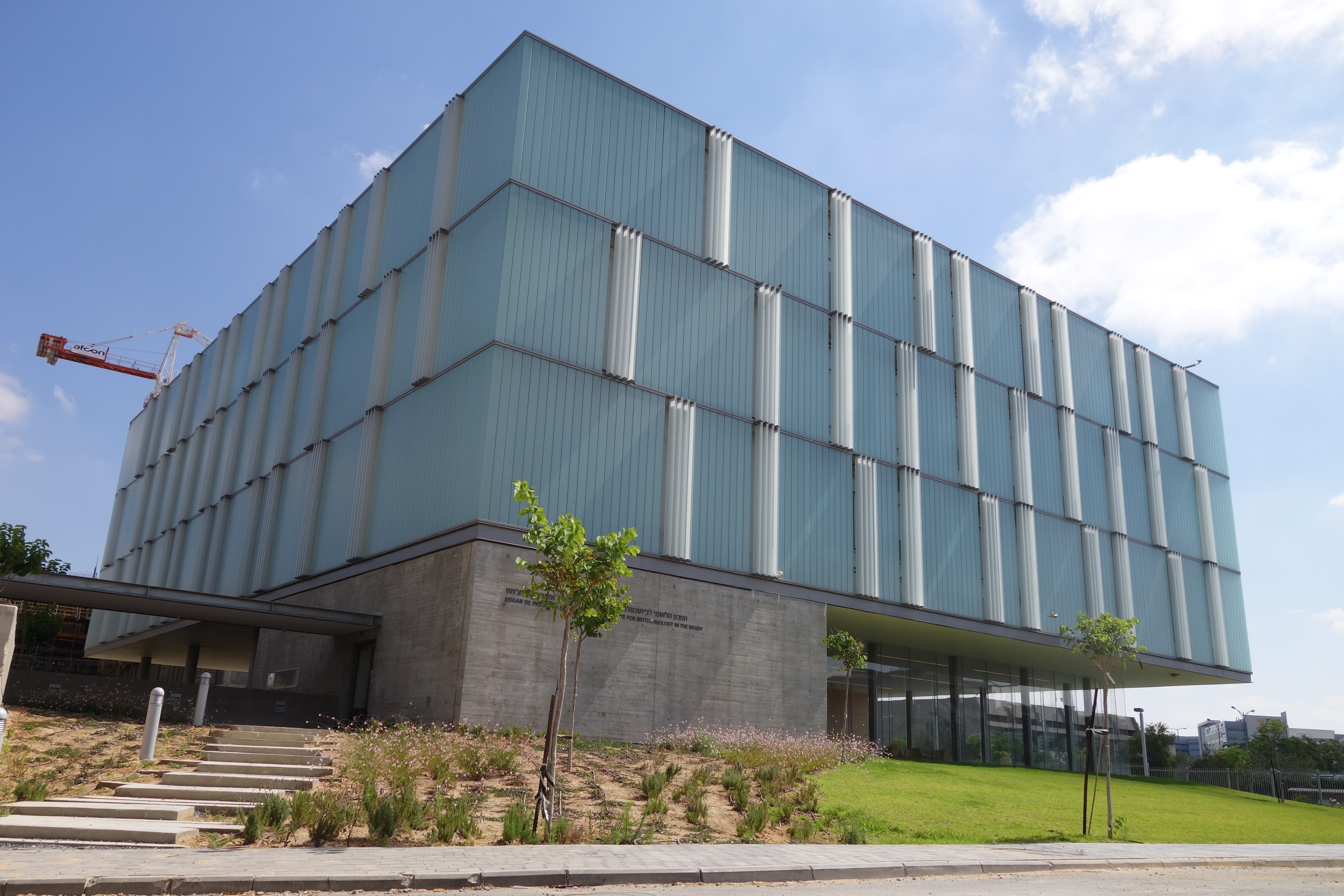
National Institute for Biotechnology

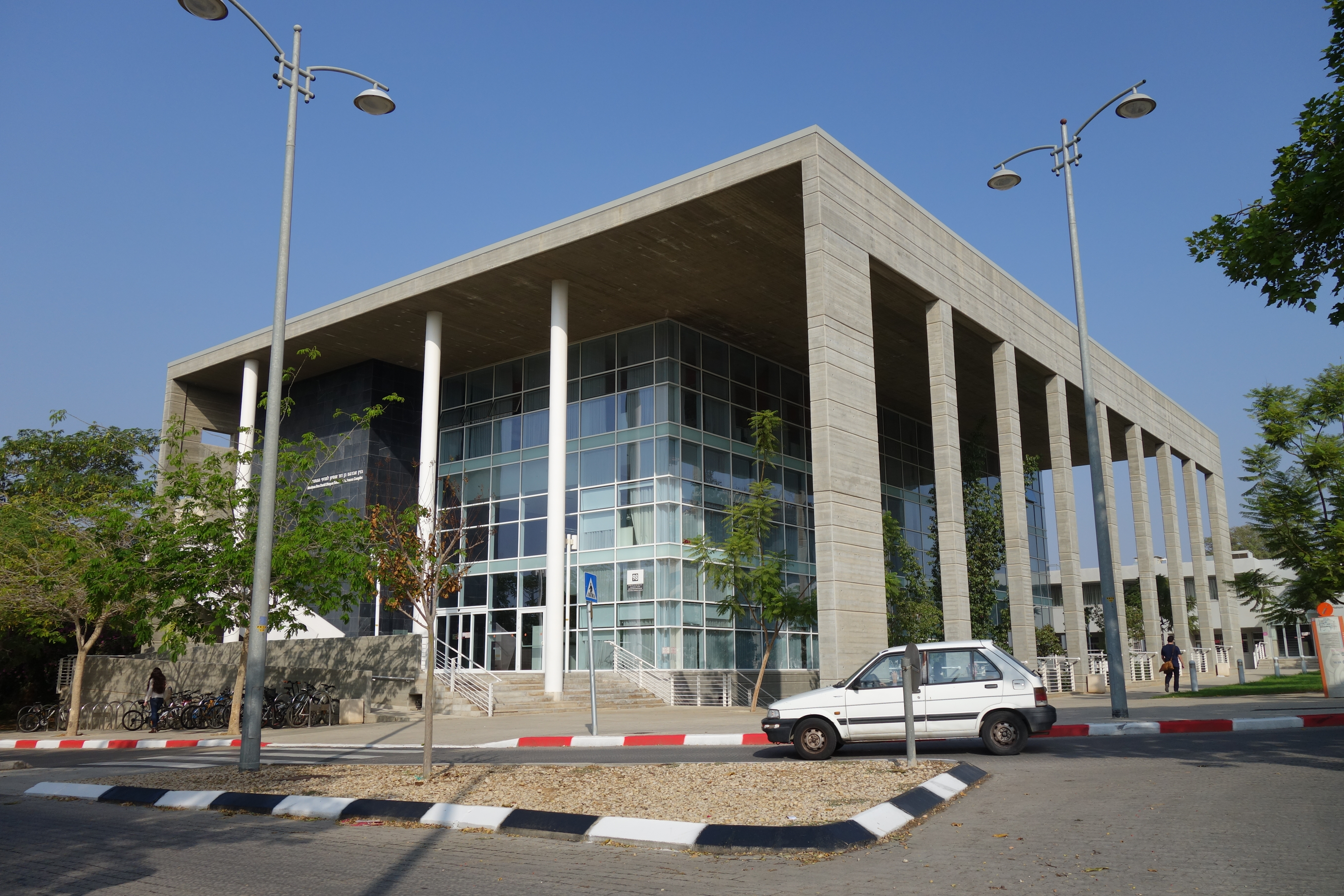
Behavioral Sciences Complex

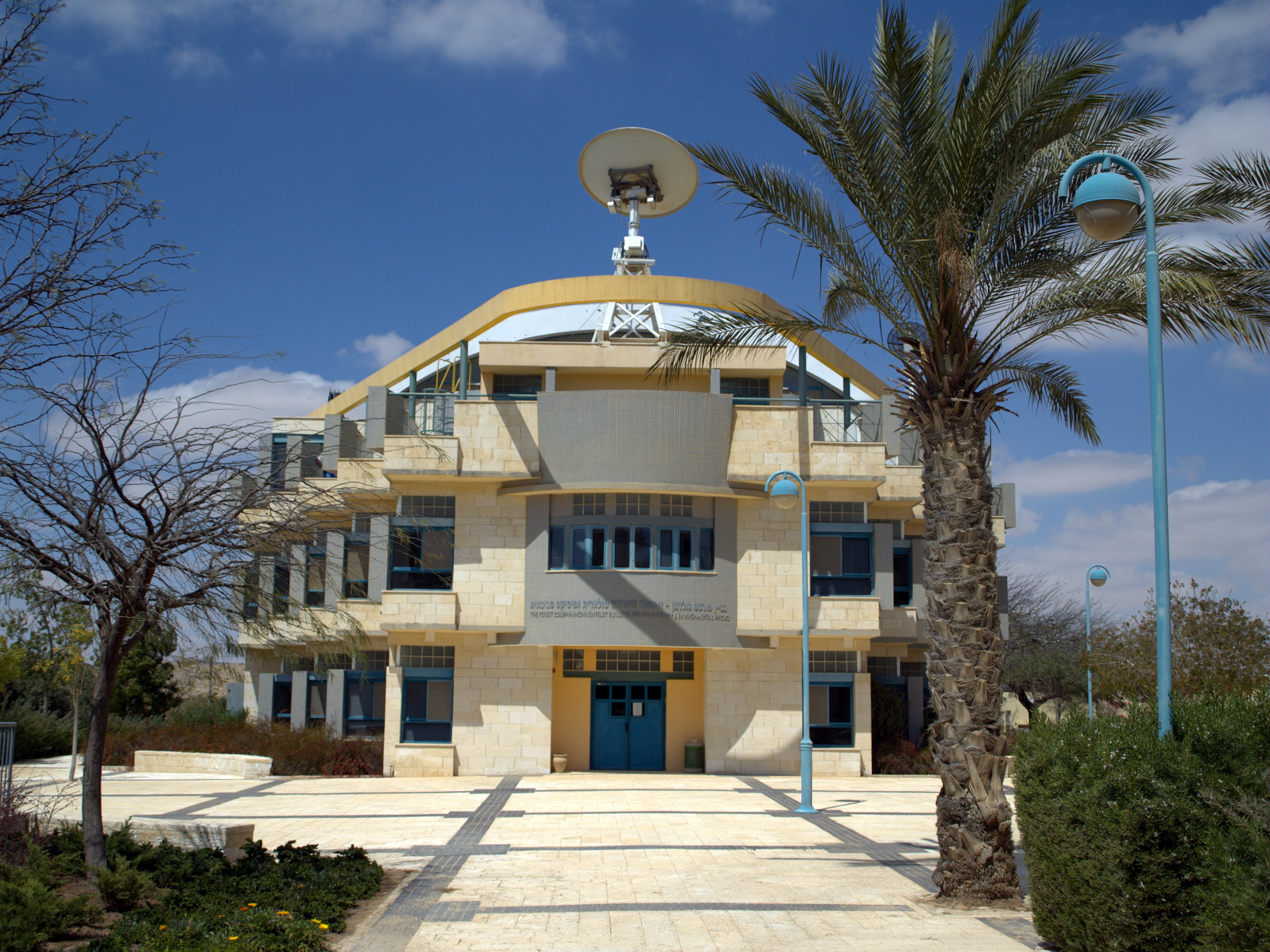
Solar and Environmental Physics building

Ben-Gurion University has five faculties with 51 academic departments and units: Faculty of Engineering Sciences, Faculty of Health Sciences, Faculty of Natural Sciences, Faculty of Humanities and Social Sciences and the Guilford Glazer Faculty of Business and Management.

Ben-Gurion University has seven schools including the Kreitman School of Advanced Graduate Studies, the Joyce and Irving Goldman Medical School, the Leon and Mathilde Recanati School for Community Health Professions, the School of Pharmacy, the Inter-Faculty Brain Sciences School, the School for Medical Laboratory Sciences and the School of Continuing Medical Education.

Ben-Gurion University has eight research institutes including the Jacob Blaustein Institutes for Desert Research, the Ilse Katz Institute for Nanoscale Science and Technology, the Ben-Gurion Research Institute for the Study of Israel and Zionism, and Heksherim – The Research Institute for Jewish and Israeli Literature and Culture.

In 2024, the university launched a new medical school program designed specifically to serve recent immigrants to Israel. The initiative, aimed at addressing physician shortages and easing the professional transition for olim, was made possible by a major philanthropic gift from Israeli industrialist Sami Sagol.

In 1978 Prof. Alfred Inselberg, then with the Faculty of Mathematics, together with Dr. Sam Bergman and Dr. Avraham Melkman initiated the Computer Science program which by 1982 had attracted more than 200 students. Notably, this was the first university program in Israel where students were taught Pascal, used terminals rather than punch-card machines and where the first Computer Graphics Laboratory in Israel was established. This was the genesis of Computer Science education at Ben-Gurion University which eventually led to a separate Department of Computer Science.

==== The Medical School for International Health (MSIH) ====
The Medical School for International Health grew out of collaborations between faculty at Ben-Gurion University and Columbia University. A joint global health and medical care program, it was established in 1997.

The MSIH is a four-year, North American-style medical school that incorporates global health coursework into all four years of the medical school curriculum. It is an English-language collaboration between Ben-Gurion University of the Negev Faculty of Health Sciences and Columbia University Irving Medical Center and is located in Beersheba, Israel. The school enrolls more than 30 students each year. Most of the students are from the United States, with several from Canada and other countries.

In October 2018, The Medical School for International Health celebrated 20 years of existence, by holding a two-day seminar to recognize its achievements and bring together its many partners from around the world. The event concluded with the Physicians' Oath Ceremony (not to be confused with a White Coat Ceremony) by the Class of 2022.

In October 2019, the 21st cohort of MSIH (Class of 2023) took their Physician's Oath at a special ceremony on campus. For the first time in the program's history, the faculty presented each student of the class with an actual White Coat emblazoned with the MSIH logo.

=== Interdisciplinary research centers ===
There are sixty one interdisciplinary research centers at Ben-Gurion University including: the S. Daniel Abraham International Center for Health and Nutrition, the Robert H. Arnow Center for Bedouin Studies and Development, the Ben-Gurion National Solar Energy Center, the Goldstein-Goren International Center for Jewish Thought, the Esther and Sidney Rabb Center for Holocaust and Redemption Studies, the Edmond J. Safra Center for the Design and Engineering of Functional Biopolymers, the Reimund Stadler Minerva Center for Mesoscale Macromolecular Engineering and the Zlotowski Center for Neurosciences.

=== International programs ===
BGU International has worked to increase the number of academic programs available to international students, in English instruction. The programs include: the Albert Katz International School of Desert Studies, the Medical School for International Health, the Israel Studies Masters Program, the African Sustainable Communities MA Program, the MBA International Program, and BGU International's Summer Programs, Semester Study Abroad, and Academic Internship programs. The university hosts students from nearly 70 countries.

== Publications ==
- Geography Research Forum (GRF), Israel's only English-language geography journal

== See also ==
- List of Israeli universities and colleges
- Education in Israel
