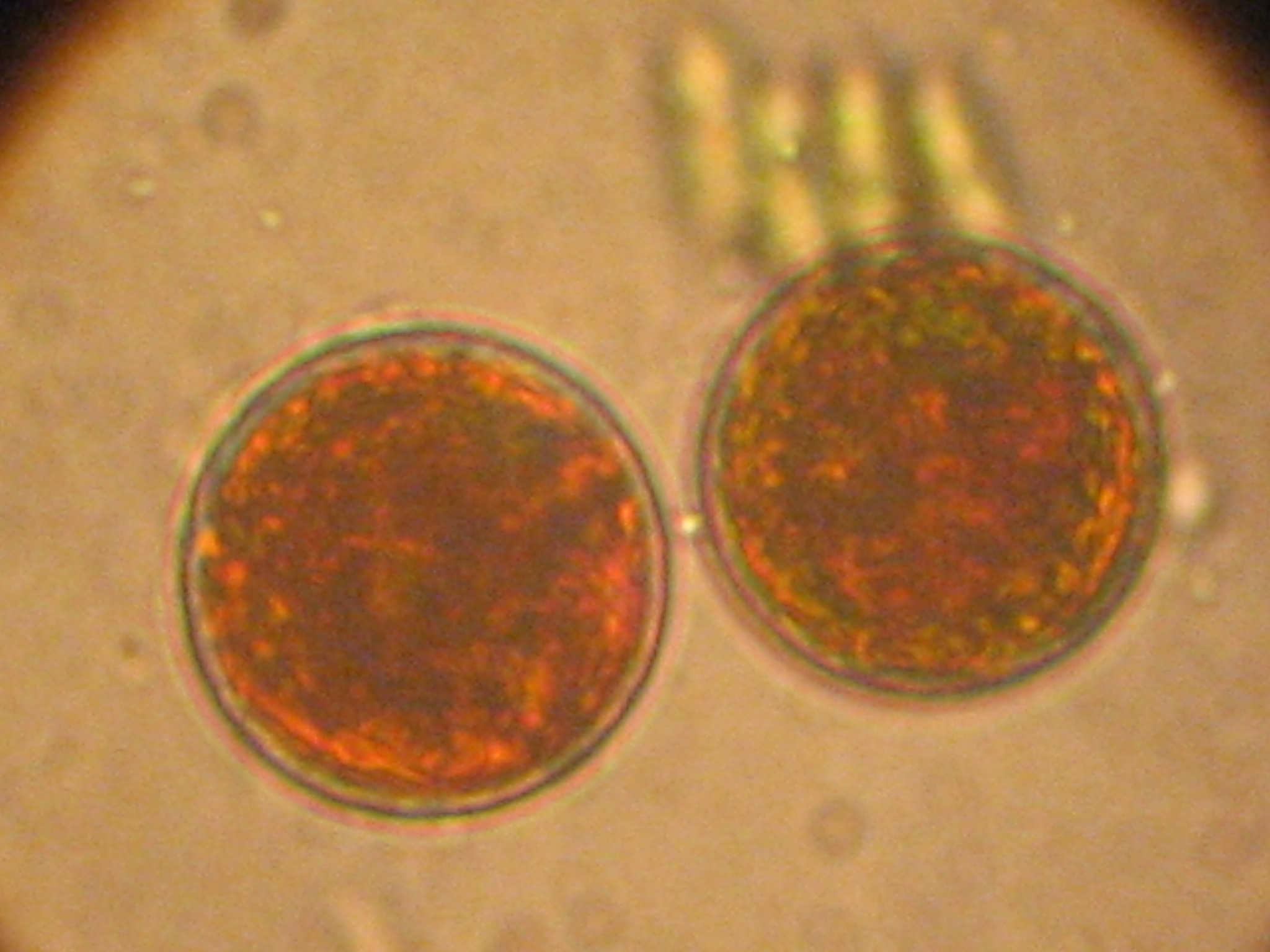
- Two individuals of Haematococcus sp.

Scientific classification
- Kingdom: Plantae
- Division: Chlorophyta
- Class: Chlorophyceae
- Order: Chlamydomonadales
- Family: Haematococcaceae
- Genus: Haematococcus; Flotow, 1844

Species
- Haematococcus alpinus Haematococcus carocellus Haematococcus ellipsoidalis Haematococcus lacustris Haematococcus privus Haematococcus rubens Haematococcus rubicundus Haematococcus thermalis

= Haematococcus =

Genus of algae

Haematococcus is a genus of algae in the family Haematococcaceae. It is a freshwater alga with a nearly cosmopolitan distribution, found from every continent except Antarctica.

Members of this group are a common cause of the pink color found in birdbaths, which is caused by the carotenoid pigment astaxanthin. Because of their ability to produce astaxanthin, Haematococcus (and in particular H. lacustris) is widely used in the biotechnology industry.

== Description ==
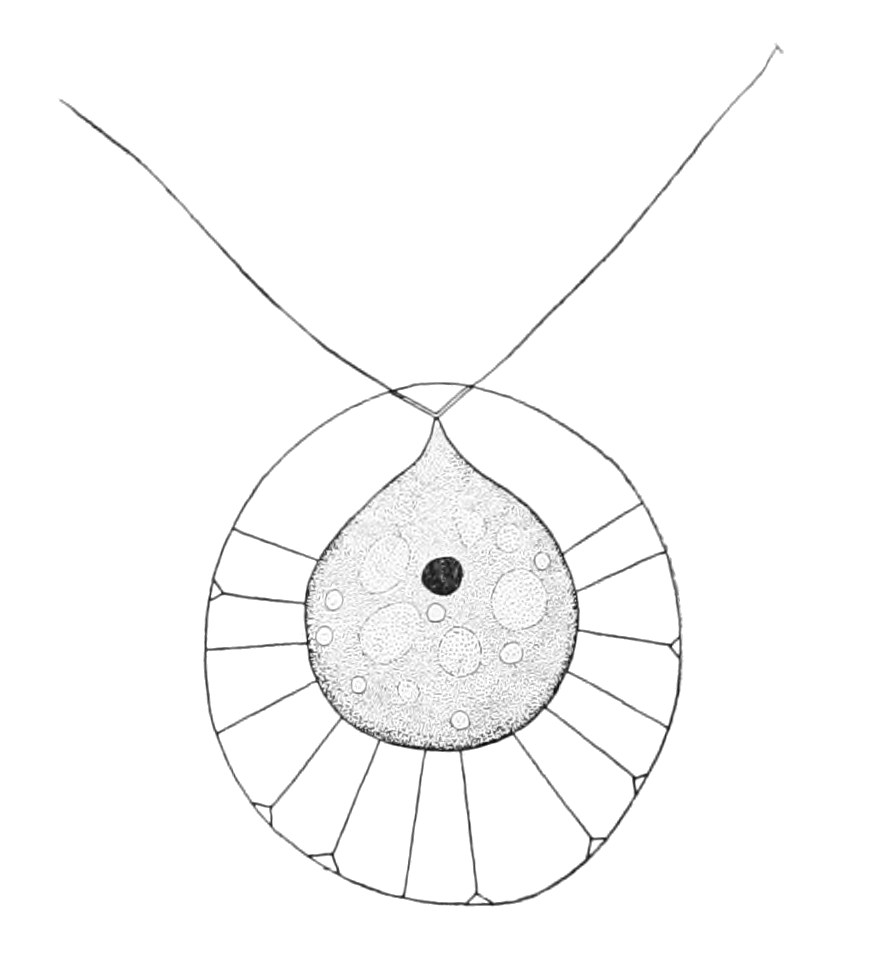
Haematococcus lacustris, flagellated vegetative cell

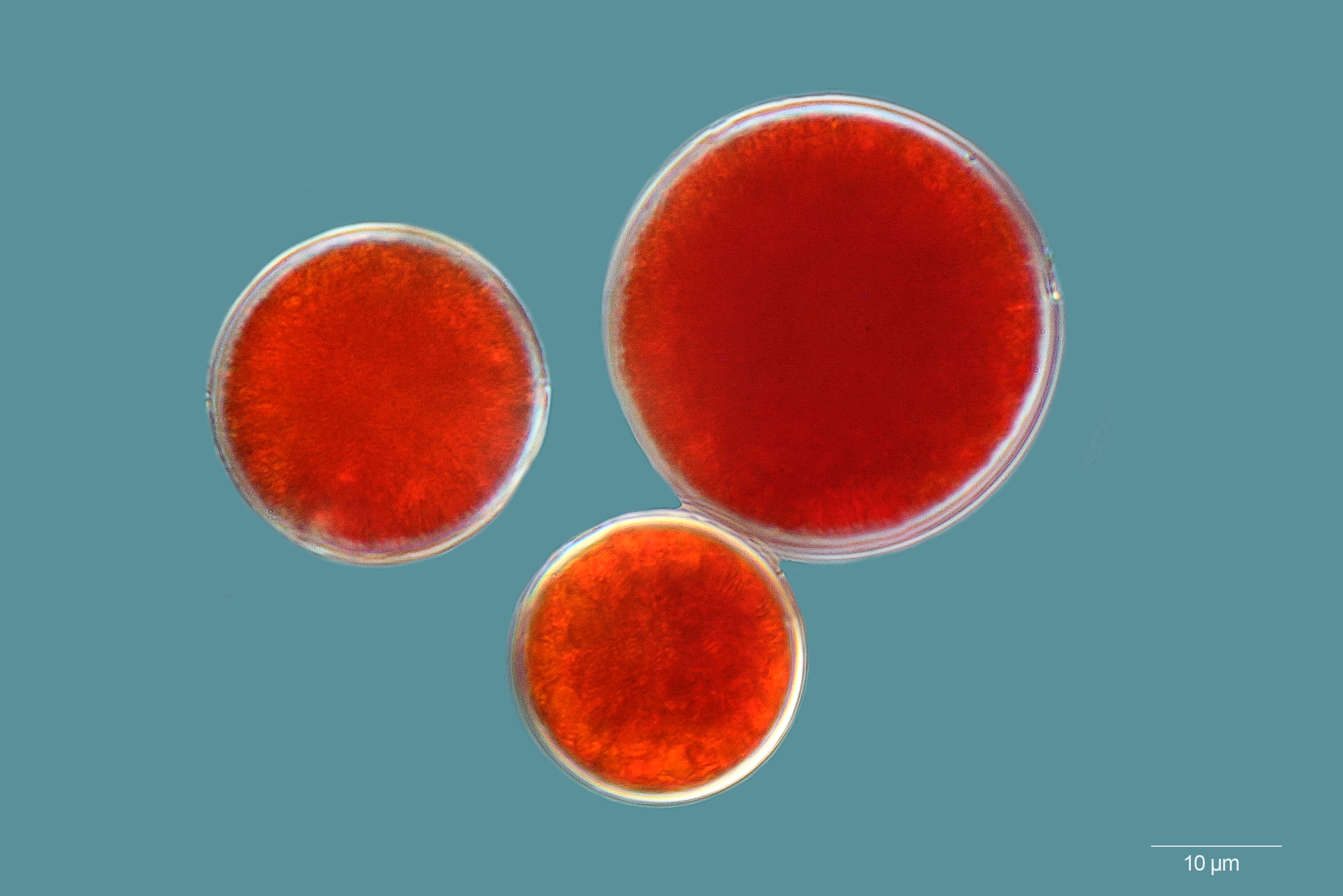
Haematococcus lacustris, aplanospores/cysts

Haematococcus consists of single-celled algae. In its vegetative state, cells are surrounded by a ovoid, ellipsoid or globose cell wall which is expanded from the rest of the protoplast; the protoplast is connected to the cell wall via thin cytoplasmic threads. The main part of the protoplast is ovoid to ellipsoid, and the anterior end is narrowed into a point attached to the cell wall, from which two equal flagella emerge. Chloroplasts are cup-shaped, occasionally tubular and perforate, with 1-2 (or several) pyrenoids and a large stigma. The single nucleus is situated near the middle of the chloroplast. Multiple contractile vacuoles are present. The contents of the cell may be obscured and difficult to see in some cells, because cells accumulate pigments (hematochrome or astaxanthin).

Haematococcus has a complex life cycle. Under typical conditions, vegetative cells are flagellated, and occasionally undergo budding. Vegetative cells can lose their flagella and undergo budding without flagella. Both motile (flagellated) and nonmotile (nonflagellated) cells can develop into a sporangium which undergoes successive rounds of divisions, developing into zoospores). However, nonmotile vegetative cells can also develop into a sporangium that develops into 2, 4, 8, or occasionally 20-32 aplanospores. Zoospores can also lose their flagella and become aplanospores. Aplanospores develop into nonmotile, vegetative cells. The aplanospores are also called akinetes, which are distinguished from normal aplanospores by having thick cell walls; however, sources disagree on whether the aplanospores actually have thicker cell walls than typical nonmotile vegetative cells. Aplanospores are also called cysts.

There are some reports of sexual reproduction, involving isogamous gametes, but they have not been substantiated. They may actually be from a parasite producing gamete-like cells.

== Taxonomy ==
Haematococcus has a long and complicated taxonomic history. It was first observed in 1802 by Justin Girod-Chantrans, who named it Volvox lacustris. Meanwhile, the name Haematococcus was first published by Carl Adolph Agardh, which contained three species of reddish, round-celled organisms: H. noltii (now considered to be Euglena sanguinea), H. sanguinea (now considered to be Gloeocapsa sanguinea), and H. grevillei, of which taxonomsts disagree on its true identity. Unambiguous reports of the organism now known as Haematococcus were also published by Auguste Morren and Charles François Antoine Morren in 1841 under the name Disceraea, and independently by Julius von Flotow, who used the name Haematococcus and called his organism Haematococcus pluvialis. Because Morren & Morren published their name first, it had priority, but Flotow's name Haematococcus was widely accepted in literature. Therefore, the type species of Haematococcus was conserved to Haematococcus pluvialis (thereby preferring Flotow's circumscription over Agardh's) and the name Haematococcus was also conserved against Morren's Disceraea. Although the type of Haematococcus is Haematococcus pluvialis, the name of the type species is Haematococcus lacustris.

In 2013, Haematococcus was found to be polyphyletic; some species, particularly those with thick, branched cytoplasmic threads, were transferred to the resurrected genus Balticola. The species Haematococcus carocellus likely also belongs to Balticola.
