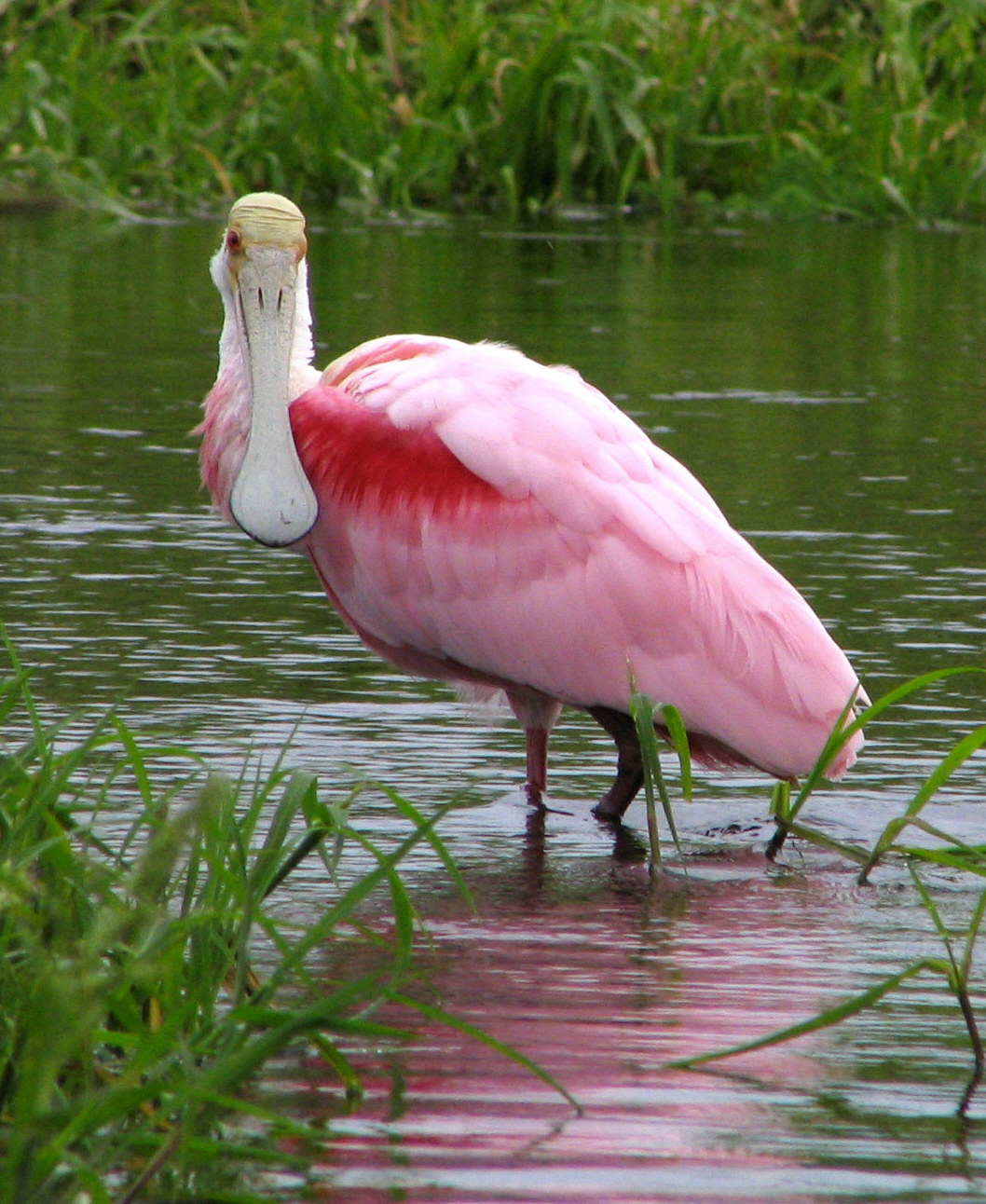
- At Myakka River State Park, Sarasota County, Florida.

Conservation status
- Least Concern (IUCN 3.1)

Scientific classification
- Kingdom: Animalia
- Phylum: Chordata
- Class: Aves
- Order: Pelecaniformes
- Family: Threskiornithidae
- Genus: Platalea
- Species: P. ajaja

Binomial name
- Platalea ajaja Linnaeus, 1758
- Year-round Nonbreeding

Synonyms
- Ajaia ajaja (Linnaeus, 1758)

= Roseate spoonbill =

Roseate spoonbill Temporal range: Late Pleistocene – present

Species of bird

The roseate spoonbill (Platalea ajaja) is a social wading bird of the ibis and spoonbill family, Threskiornithidae. It is a resident breeder in both South and North America. The roseate spoonbill's pink color is diet-derived, consisting of the carotenoid pigment canthaxanthin, like the American flamingo.

== Taxonomy ==
The roseate spoonbill was formally described in 1758 by the Swedish naturalist Carl Linnaeus in the tenth edition of his Systema Naturae under the current binomial name Platalea ajaja. Linnaeus largely based his account on the "Aiaia" that had been described and illustrated over a century earlier by the German naturalist Georg Marcgrave in his book Historia Naturalis Brasiliae. Linnaeus specified the type locality as South America but this is now restricted to Brazil. The genus name Platalea is Latin and means "broad", referring to the distinctive shape of the bill; the specific epithet ajaja is from the name for the species in the Tupi language as reported by Marcgrave. The species is treated as monotypic: no subspecies are recognised.

The roseate spoonbill is sometimes placed in its own genus – Ajaia. A 2010 study of mitochondrial DNA of the spoonbills by Chesser and colleagues found that the roseate and yellow-billed spoonbills were each other's closest relatives, and the two were descended from an early offshoot from the ancestors of the other four spoonbill species. They felt the genetic evidence meant it was equally valid to consider all six to be classified within the genus Platalea or alternatively the two placed in the monotypic genera Platibis and Ajaia, respectively. However, as the six species were so similar morphologically, keeping them within the one genus made more sense.

== Description ==
The roseate spoonbill is 71–86 cm (28–34 in) long, with a 120–133 cm (47–52 in) wingspan and a body mass of 1.2–1.8 kg (2.6–4.0 lb). The tarsus measures 9.7–12.4 cm (3.8–4.9 in), the culmen measures 14.5–18 cm (5.7–7.1 in) and the wing measures 32.3–37.5 cm (12.7–14.8 in) and thus the legs, bill, neck and spatulate bill all appear elongated. Adults have a bare greenish head ("golden buff" when breeding) and a white neck, back and breast (with a tuft of pink feathers in the center when breeding), and are otherwise a deep pink. The bill is grey. There is no significant sexual dimorphism.

Like the American flamingo, their pink color is diet-derived, consisting of the carotenoid pigment canthaxanthin. Another carotenoid, astaxanthin, can also be found deposited in flight and body feathers. The colors can range from pale pink to bright magenta, depending on age, whether breeding or not, and location. Unlike herons, spoonbills fly with their necks outstretched. They alternate groups of stiff, shallow wingbeats with glides.

== Distribution ==
In the United States, the species is locally common in Texas, Florida, and southwest Louisiana. Generally, the species occurs in South America mostly east of the Andes, and in coastal regions of the Caribbean, Central America, Mexico, and the Gulf Coast of the United States, and from central Florida's Atlantic coast at Merritt Island National Wildlife Refuge, adjoined with NASA Kennedy Space Center at least as far north as South Carolina's Myrtle Beach.

Plume hunting in the eighteenth and nineteenth centuries almost drove the roseate spoonbill to extinction. However, following decades of conservation efforts, and the effects of climate change, the range of the roseate spoonbill has expanded considerably in the 21st century. For instance, the species was recorded breeding in the state of Georgia for the first time in 2011. Moreover, its presence in South Carolina has expanded significantly since the 1970s, as well as a single sighting of the bird in both Michigan and Wisconsin. The last known recorded log of the bird in the state of Wisconsin was of a deceased specimen in 1845 in Rock County, until it reappeared 178 years later when a specimen was sighted by a crew that was doing birding surveys on the restricted-access Cat Island causeway on 27 July 2023.

In the summer of 2021, sightings of the bird were reported well outside its typical range, including in Washington, D.C., upstate New York, and even New Hampshire. A large flock was spotted in Huntley Meadows Park in Fairfax County, Virginia, drawing a large crowd of spectators. The bird has also been spotted in New Jersey with increasing frequency.

In Florida Bay, roseate spoonbills are an ecological and scientific indicator species. The number of nests varies with both the amount of fresh water and the depth of seawater there, as wetlands turn into open ocean. The birds are choosing to nest further north and inland in Florida, with sharp changes in nest locations noted in the years 2006–2020.

== Behavior ==
Little is known about the roseate spoonbill's behavior outside of their foraging habits. This species feeds in shallow fresh or coastal waters by swinging its bill from side to side as it steadily walks through the water, often in groups. Moreover, the spoon-shaped bill allows it to sift easily through mud.

The bird feeds on crustaceans, bits of plant material, aquatic insects, mollusks, frogs, newts and very small fish (such as minnows) ignored by larger waders. In Brazil, researchers found roseate spoonbill diets to consist of fish, insects, crustaceans, mollusks, and seeds, all foraged from limnetic/freshwater habitats. This habitat specialization, combined with the relative plasticity of great egret foraging behavior, allows the two species to minimize competition during the breeding season. Roseate spoonbills must compete for food with other freshwater birds, such as snowy egrets, great egrets, tricolored herons and American white pelicans. Roseate spoonbills are often trailed by egrets when foraging in a commensal "beater-follower" relationship, as the spoonbill's disturbance of the sediment makes prey more available to the egret (follower).

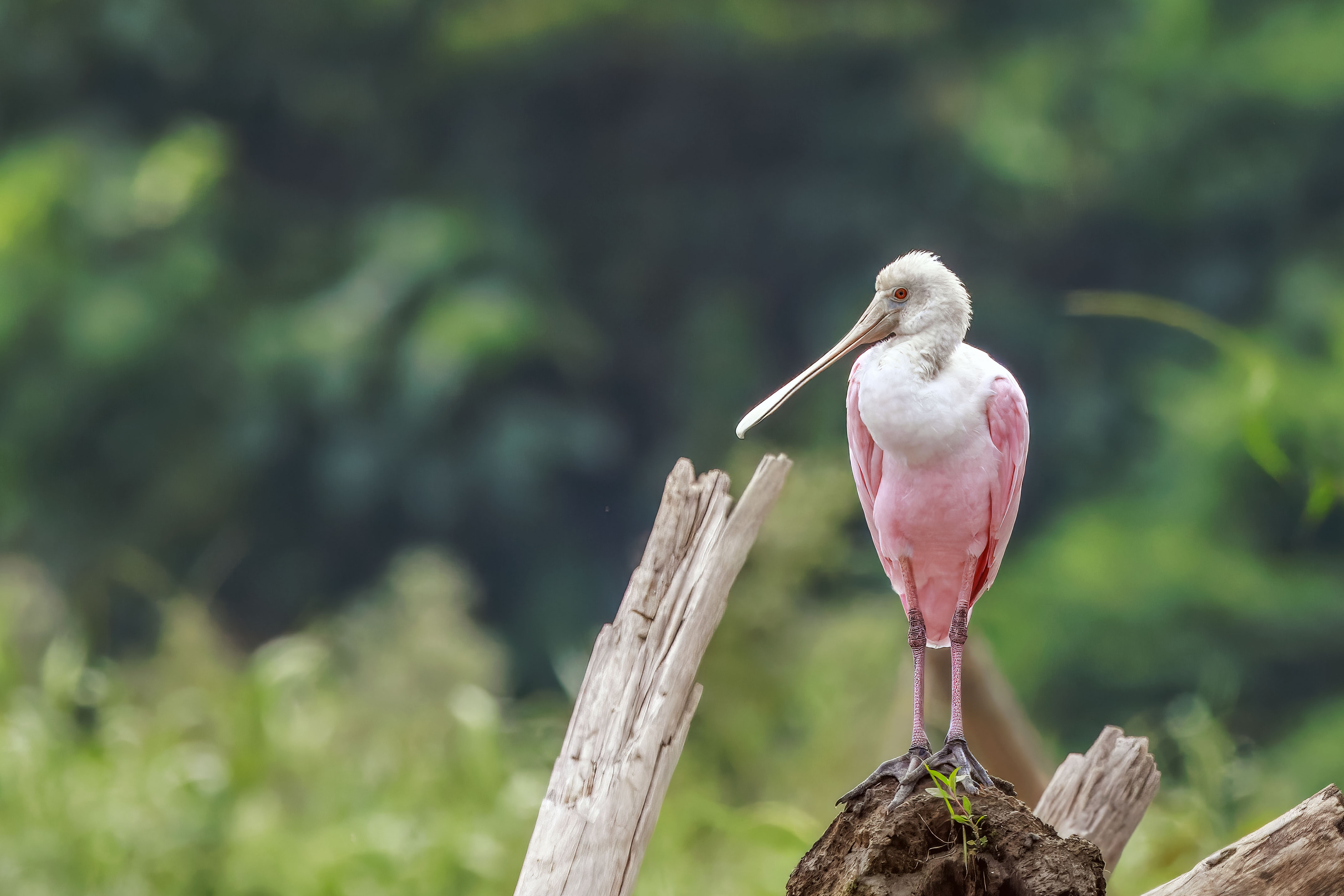
Young adult, Ecuador

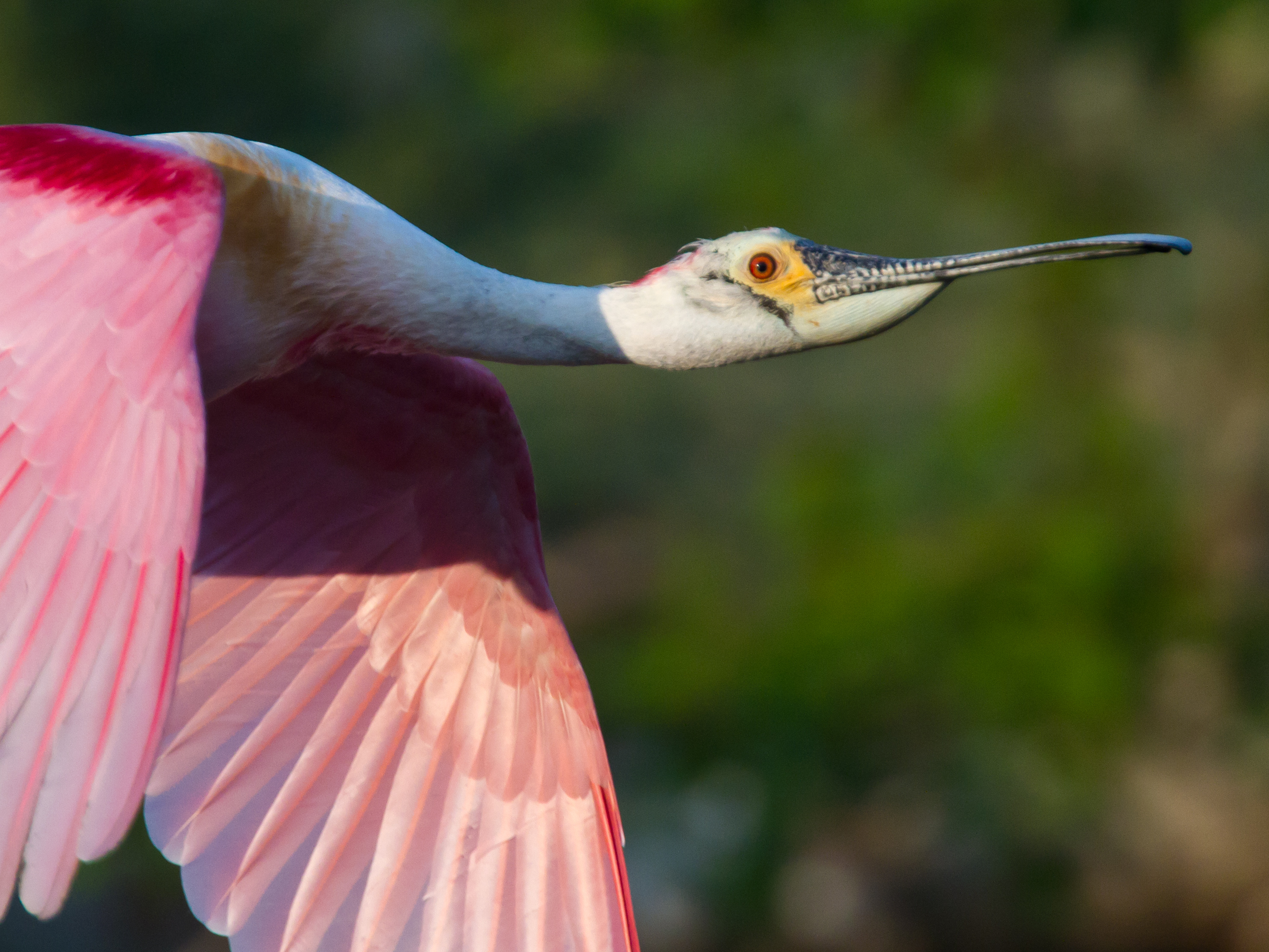
On High Island, Texas, United States

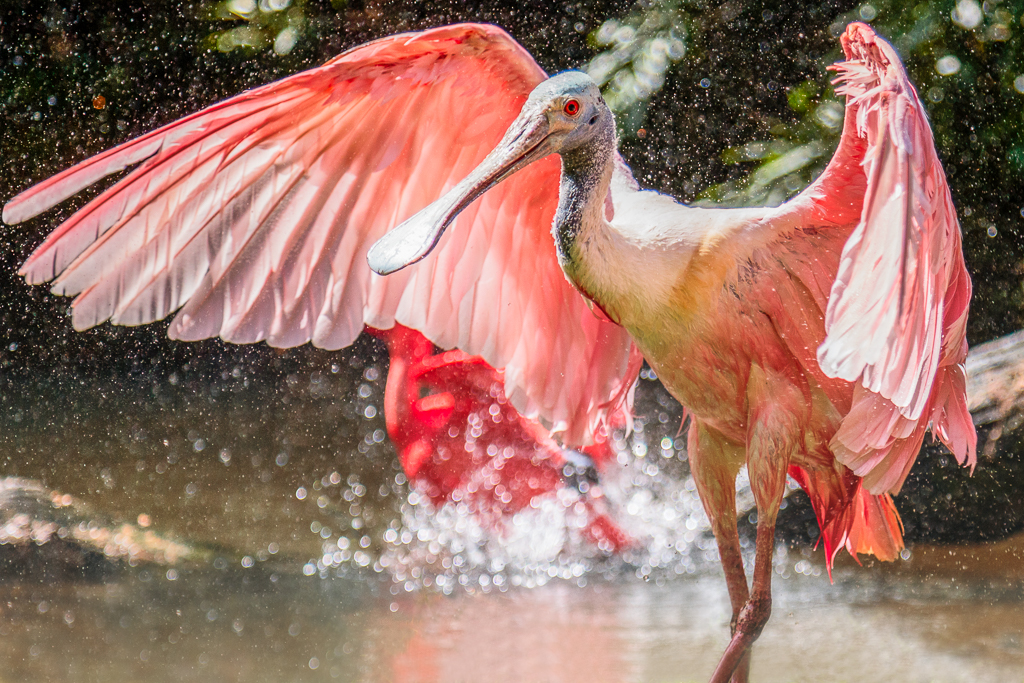
At GaiaZoo, Netherlands

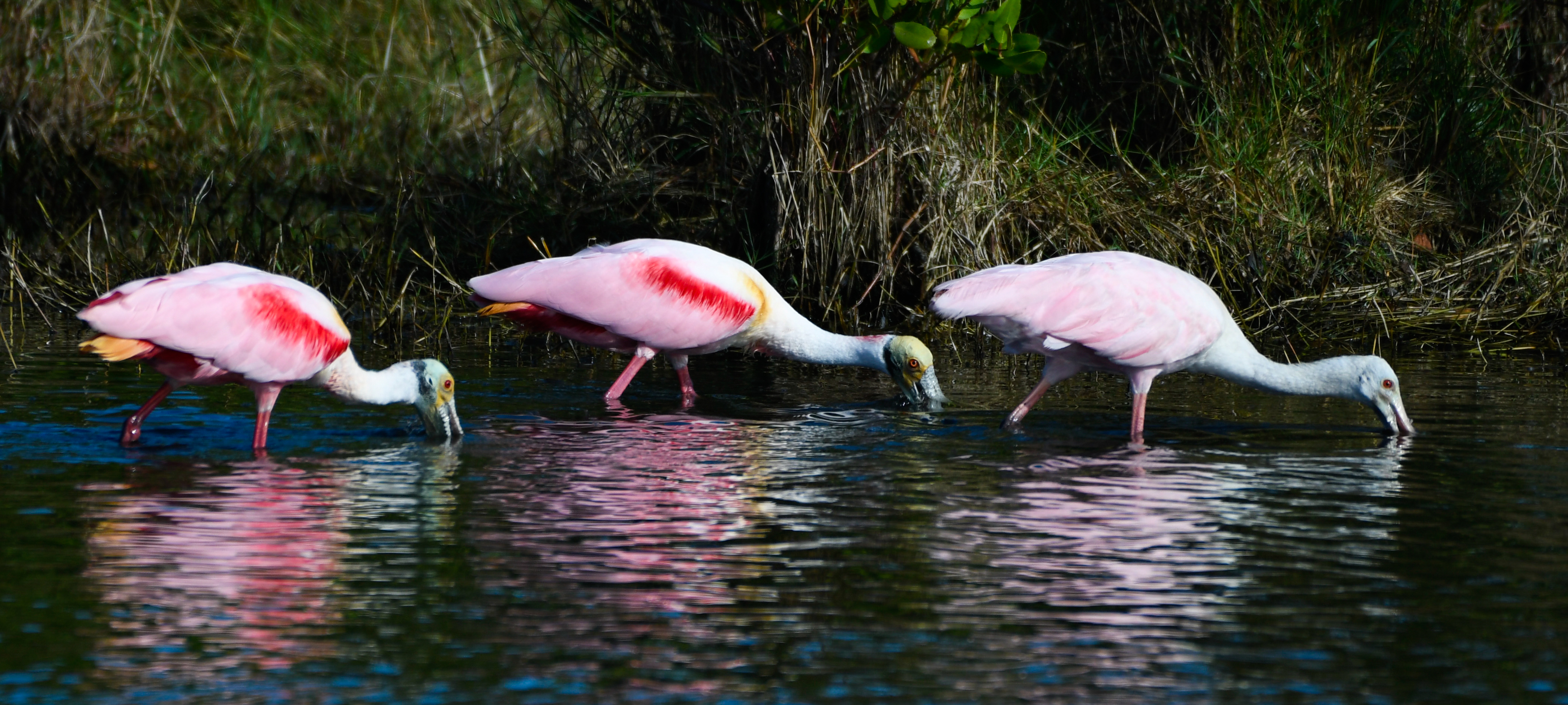
Foraging roseate spoonbills at Merritt Island, Florida, United States

Video of feeding behavior, Merritt Island, Florida, United States

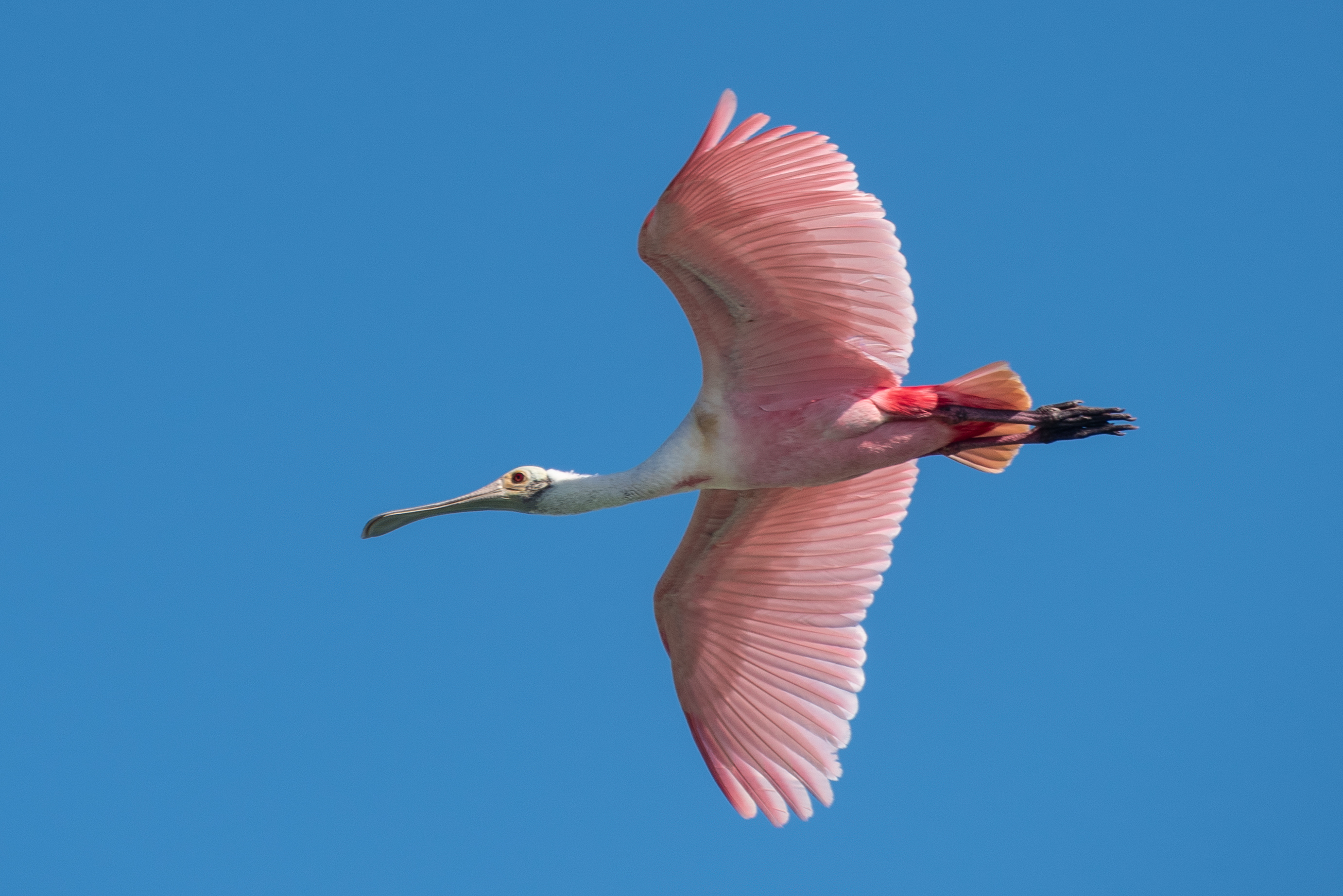
In flight at Sian Ka'an Biosphere Reserve, Mexico

=== Breeding ===
The roseate spoonbill nests in shrubs or trees, often mangroves, laying two to five eggs, which are whitish with brown markings. Immature birds have white, feathered heads, and the pink of the plumage is paler. The bill is yellowish or pinkish. Nestlings are sometimes killed by turkey vultures, bald eagles, raccoons and invasive fire ants.

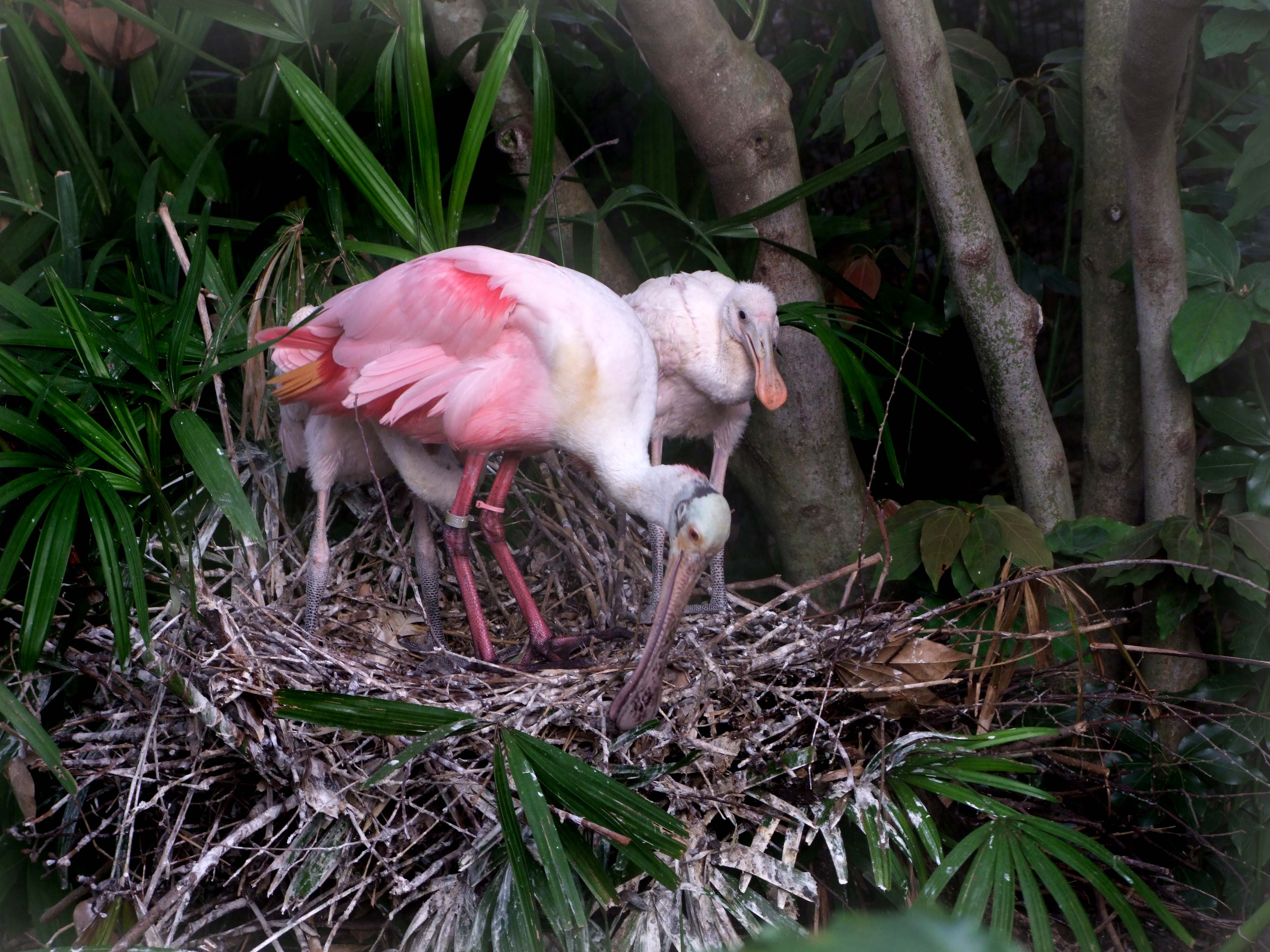
Adult with two juveniles on a nest

== Conservation and threats ==
Plume hunting in the eighteenth and nineteenth centuries almost drove the roseate spoonbill to extinction. However, it is currently considered not threatened. Information about predation on adults is lacking. In 2022, an 18-year-old banded bird was discovered, making it the oldest known wild individual.

In Florida, roseate spoonbills may be eaten by some growth stage of invasive snakes such as Burmese pythons, reticulated pythons, Central African rock pythons, Southern African rock pythons, boa constrictors, yellow anacondas, Bolivian anacondas, dark-spotted anacondas, and green anacondas.
