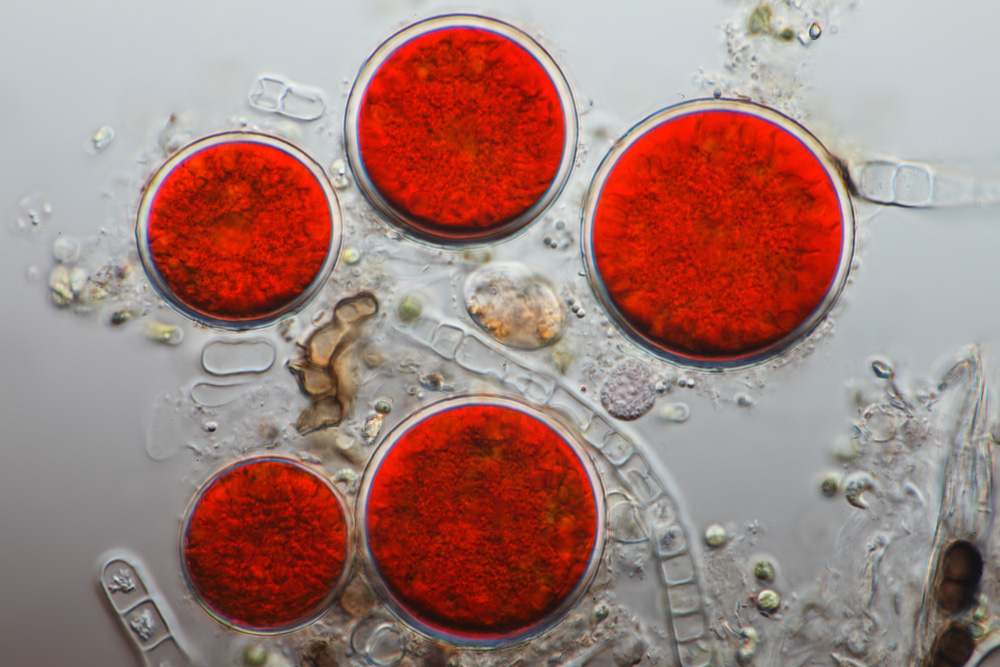
- Haematococcus lacustris cysts full of astaxanthin
- A coccal H. lacustris cell, void of astaxanthin

Scientific classification
- Kingdom: Plantae
- Division: Chlorophyta
- Class: Chlorophyceae
- Order: Chlamydomonadales
- Family: Haematococcaceae
- Genus: Haematococcus
- Species: H. lacustris

Binomial name
- Haematococcus lacustris (Girod-Chantrans) Rostafinski

Synonyms
- Volvox lacustris Girod-Chantrans; Sphaerella lacustris (Girod-Chantrans) Wittrock ex Hansgirg; Haematococcus pluvialis Flotow; Sphaerella pluvialis (Flotow) Wittrock

= Haematococcus lacustris =

Species of alga

Haematococcus lacustris is a freshwater species of green algae Chlorophyta from the family Haematococcaceae. This species is well known for its high content of the strong antioxidant astaxanthin, which is important in multiple applications. The high amount of astaxanthin is present in the resting cells, which are produced and rapidly accumulated when the environmental conditions become unfavorable for normal cell growth. Examples of such conditions include bright light, high salinity, and low availability of nutrients. Haematococcus lacustris is usually found in temperate regions around the world. Their resting cysts are often responsible for the blood-red colour seen in the bottom of dried out rock pools and bird baths. This colour is caused by astaxanthin which is believed to protect the resting cysts from the detrimental effect of UV-radiation, when exposed to direct sunlight.

== Description ==
In its vegetative state, Haematococcus lacustris consists of motile, spherical to ellipsoid cells, (8–)10–30(–51) μm wide and (10–)15–50(–63) μm long, embedded in a broad expanded cell wall. The cell wall is attached to the protoplast via fine threads of cytoplasm. Two flagella are present. The chloroplast is parietal and has several pyrenoids and an anterior eyespot. Contractile vacuoles are numerous and scattered throughout the cytoplasm.

When deprived of fixed nitrogen, Haematococcus lacustris produces carotenoid pigments (particularly astaxanthin) giving the cytoplasm a deep red color. In unfavorable conditions, the cells lose their flagella and become immobile aplanospores (also called cysts).

== Identification ==
Haematococcus lacustris is part of a species complex of several closely related lineages. The lineages differ in physiology and genetics, but are very similar to each other in morphology (although there are some minor differences in the vegetative cell length/width and aplanospore size). These have been named as species: Haematococcus alpinus, H. privus, H. rubens, and H. rubicundus. Because of their morphological similarity, they have been called cryptic species.

== Culture ==
Vinasse can be used as a basal medium for Haematococcus pluvialis culture. The vinasse culture medium consist of vinasse diluted to 3% and supplemented with 0.7% NaCl, and the pH was adjusted to 7.0. A 0.4 g/L quantity of inoculum can be used for the initial culture (cells in vegetative growth). The culture must be performed with 0.5 vvm air at 25 °C, and until 15 days of culture.

Strains include:

- UTEX Culture 2505 Haematococcus pluvialis
- CCAP Strain Number 34/6 Haematococcus pluvialis Flotow
- SCCAP Culture number K-0084 Haematococcus pluvialis Flot. 1844 em. Wille 1903

== Applications ==
Potential applications include aquaculture, cosmetics, biotechnology and is increasingly recognized potential to improve eye health in humans.

Separately, oil from H. lacustris has been evaluated as a partial bitumen replacement in asphalt concrete, maintaining ductility at lower temperatures than the latter, albeit at higher cost. Asphalt that is 22% algae-based was claimed to be carbon neutral.

== Gallery ==
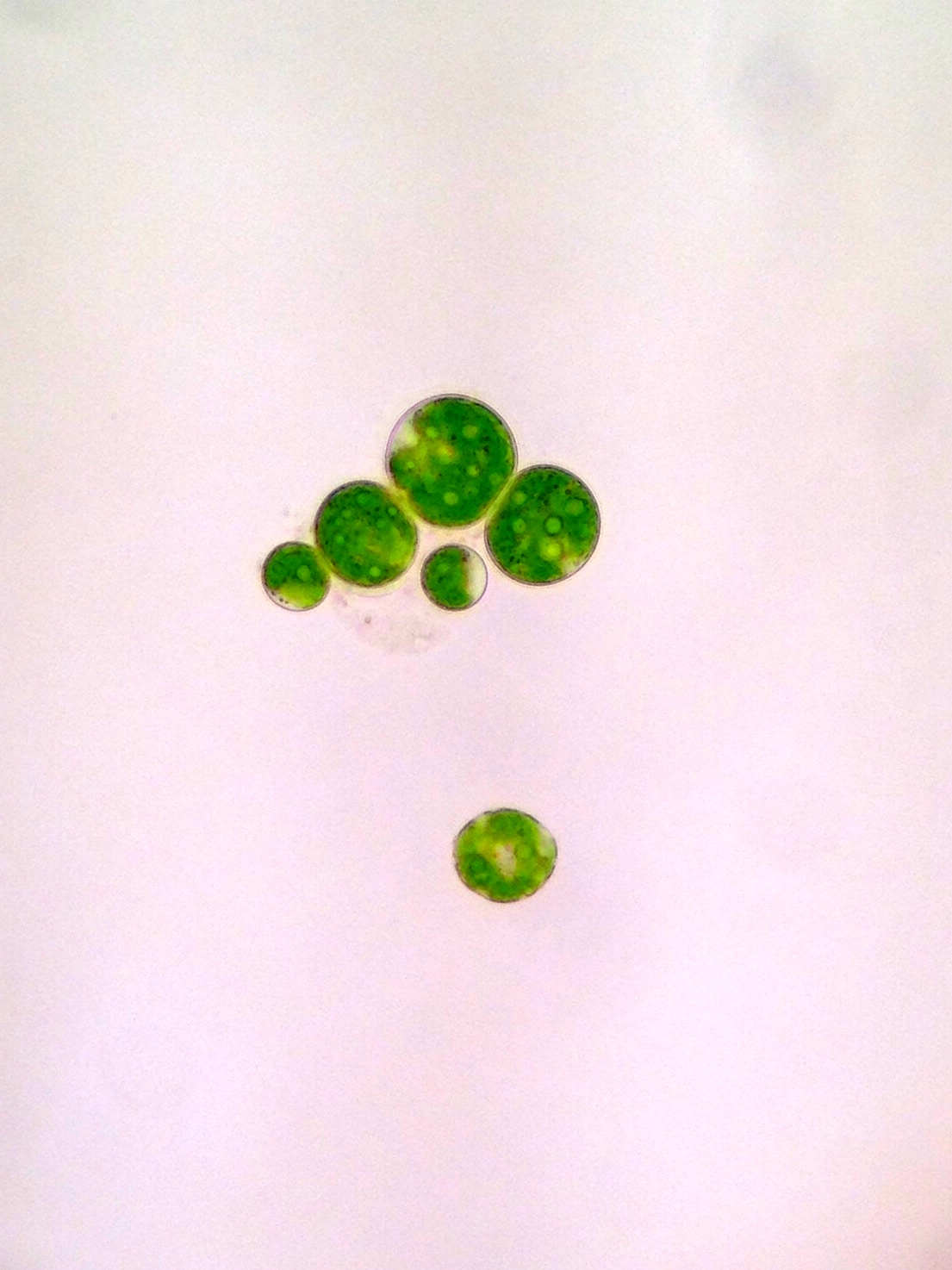
H. lacustris

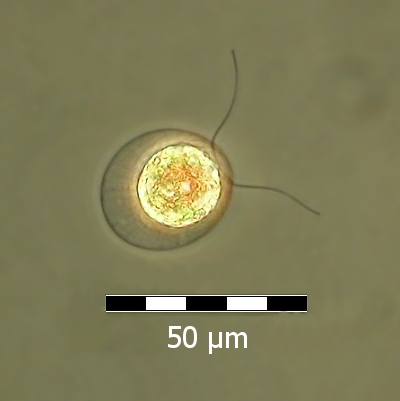
A single flagellate of H. lacustris

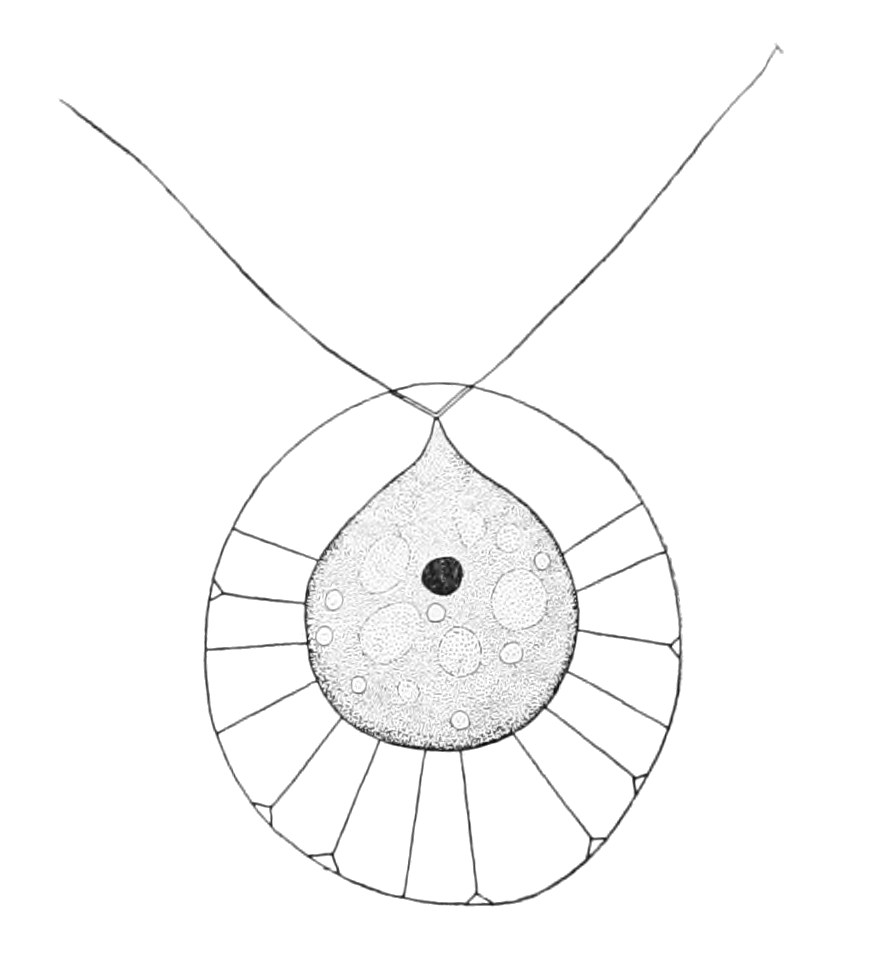
Drawing of Haematococcus lacustris

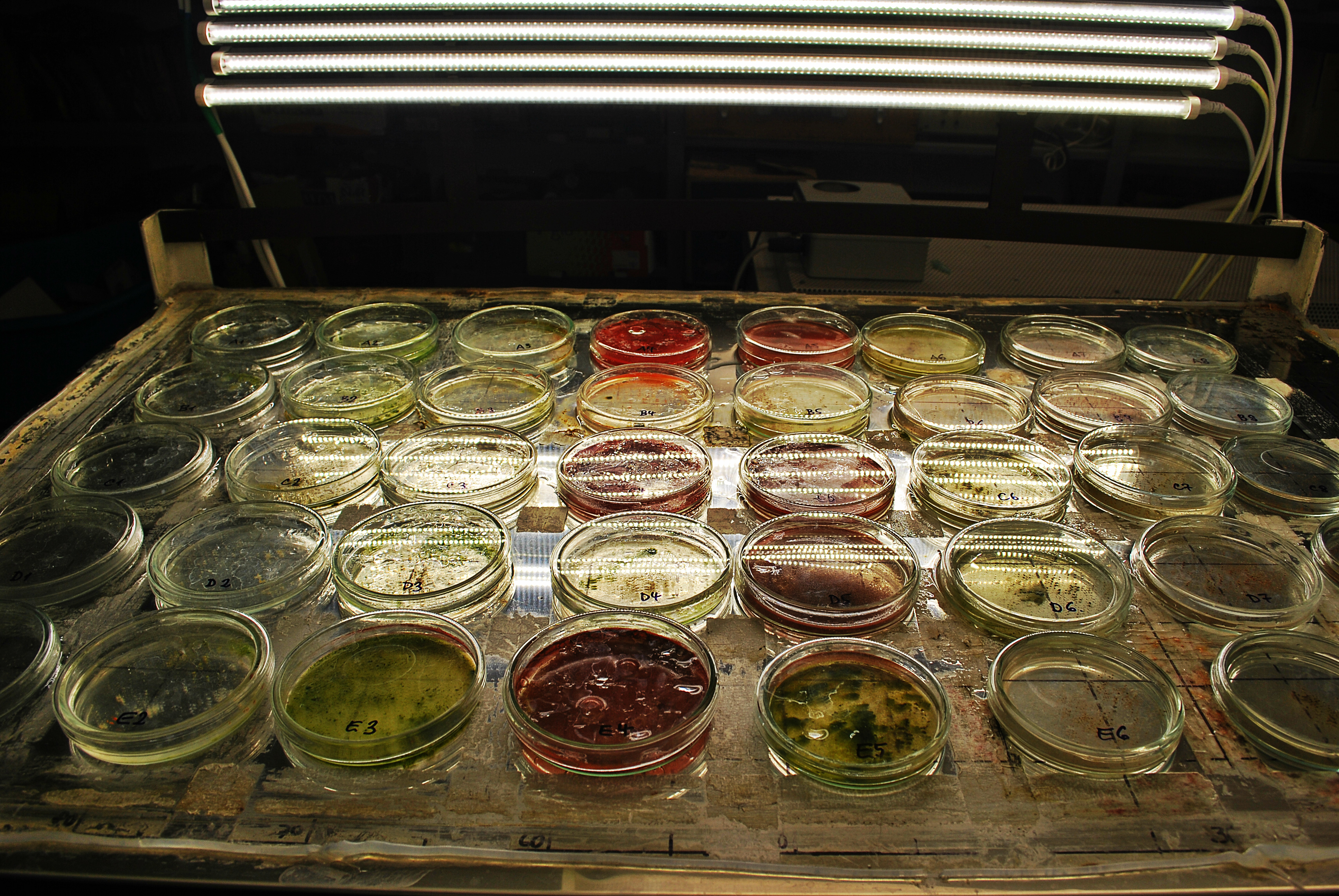
Cultivation of H. lacustris

External videos
- These Algae Curl Up Into a Ball When They Get Stressed Out – Journey to the Microcosmos
