= Ichthyotoxin =

Class of toxins

Ichthyotoxins are compounds which are either toxic to fish, or are toxins produced by fish. The former include the algae-produced euglenophycin and prymnesins, which can cause large-scale fish deaths. The latter includes ostracitoxin, produced by boxfish. Many toxin-producing algal species can be found both in marine and fresh water environments when the algae are in bloom. Ichthyotoxic poisoning in humans can cause symptoms ranging in severity dependent on how much toxin was consumed. The symptoms of an ichthyotoxin poisoning from fish venoms can include headache, vomiting, diarrhea, dizziness, and drop in blood pressure.

== Examples ==
The eggs of gar and the roe and eggs of several other fish species contain toxins. Toxin-producing algae include Prymnesium parvum.

== Anti-cancer research ==
=== Euglonophycin ===
It was discovered that euglonophycin, a euglenoid ichthyotoxin derived from Euglena sanguinea, displays anticancer activity. By sharing a similar chemical structure to solenopsin, an angiogenic inhibitor and alkaloid toxin derived from fire ant venom, euglonophycin has been studied for potential application in natural products and drug development for cancer therapy. Based on experimental studies, anti-cancer activity by euglonophycin was demonstrated in leukemia, neuroblastoma, and colorectal cancer cell lines. Specifically, in colorectal cancer cells, euglenophycin exposure exhibited cytotoxic, anti-proliferative, anti-migratory, and anti-inflammatory activity. It was determined that autophagic regulation and G1 cell cycle arrest contributes to euglenophycin's ability to inhibit colorectal cancer cell proliferation, prevent metastasis, and suppress tumour inflammation.

== See also ==
- Piscicide
- Fish toxins, poisons derived from plants used for hunting fish
- Venomous fish, fish which produce venom
