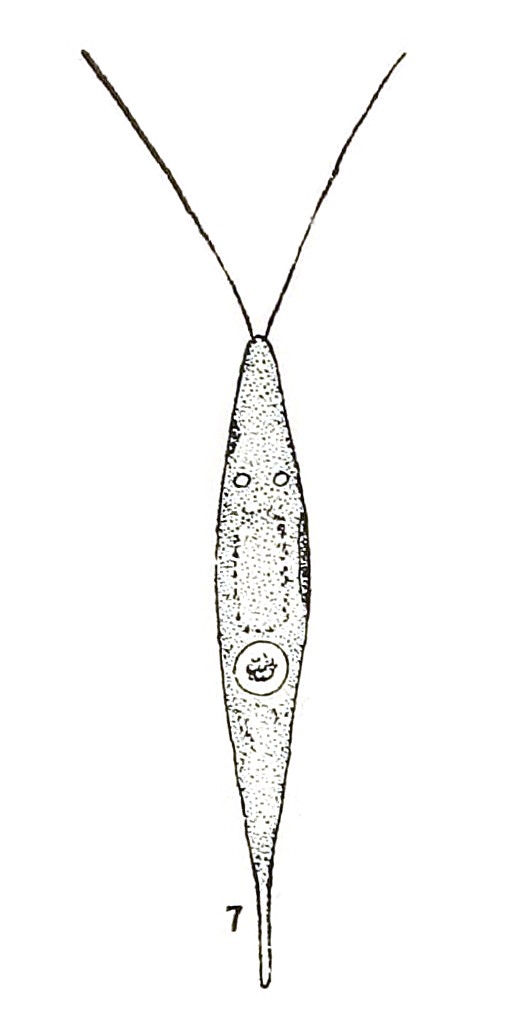

Scientific classification
- Clade: Viridiplantae
- Division: Chlorophyta
- Class: Chlorophyceae
- Order: Chlamydomonadales
- Family: Haematococcaceae
- Genus: Chlorogonium
- Species: C. elegans

Binomial name
- Chlorogonium elegans Playfair, 1918

= Chlorogonium elegans =

Species of alga

Chlorogonium elegans is a species of freshwater green algae in the family Haematococcaceae.
