= Euglenophycin =

Names
- IUPAC name 4-(6-((1E,3E,7Z)-Undeca-1,3,7-trien-1-yl)piperidin-2-yl)butan-1-ol

Identifiers
| CAS Number | 1219817-69-2 |
| 3D model (JSmol) | Interactive image |
| ChemSpider | 95668273 |
| PubChem CID | 45255907 |
| CompTox Dashboard (EPA) | DTXSID10880017 |
- InChI: InChI=1S/C20H35NO/c1-2-3-4-5-6-7-8-9-10-14-19-16-13-17-20(21-19)15-11-12-18-22/h4-5,8-10,14,19-22H,2-3,6-7,11-13,15-18H2,1H3/b5-4+,9-8+,14-10+ Key: SWJAJYNVBOUDCL-OOUMJBCFSA-N
- SMILES: OCCCCC1CCCC(/C=C/C=C/CC/C=C\CCC)N1

Properties
| Chemical formula | C_{20}H_{35}NO |
| Molar mass | 305.506 g·mol^{−1} |
- Except where otherwise noted, data are given for materials in their standard state (at 25 °C [77 °F], 100 kPa). Infobox references

Euglenophycin is an ichthyotoxic compound isolated from Euglena sanguinea, a species of the genus Euglena. It exhibits anticancer and herbicidal activity in vitro.

== History ==
Many fresh-water algae that produce toxins are known, among which the euglenoids (Euglenophyceae). It has been found that this alga lives in fresh-water environments all over the world. Many euglenoids are heterotrophic, as they feed through either phagocytosis or simple diffusion. However, a monophyletic group of the alga is mixotrophic, namely the Rapaza viridis, meaning that it switches between photosynthesis, absorbing nutrients and engulfing other eukaryotes. Furthermore, Eutreptiales and Euglenales are autotrophic as they contain chlorophyll to perform photosynthesis. Euglenoids can contain chlorophyll and an accessory pigment, and/or astaxanthin (a carotenoid), due to which they can either be coloured either green or red. Although this alga has been found relatively early in history, it took researchers some time to discover that it produces the toxin euglenophycin as no previous reports had identified euglenoid toxins. According to recent research, euglenophycin is produced in at least six species of euglenoid algae and six of seven strains of Euglena sanguinea. Other studies are focused on the potential application of euglenophycin as an anticancer drug.

=== Discovery ===
In 2002, over 21,000 striped bass died over a period of two months in an aquaculture facility in North Carolina. Around the same period, 12 more toxic algae blooms were reported in the United States with the consequence of many more fish mortalities. A total of $1.1 million was lost due to these events. No apparent cause of intoxication was found, except for reddened gill tissue. Water samples taken from the pond contained more than 99% Euglena.

In 2004, the pond water was serially fractionated and separated into dissolved compounds, bacteria and algal fractions, which were investigated. It was found that the toxin that caused the high mortality rates is non-protein, stable when heated to 30 °C for 10 minutes and maintained activity when frozen at -80 °C for 60 days. Cells from the Euglena were isolated and light microscopic analysis verified the species identity as Euglena Sanguinea and identified the toxin as euglenophycin.

== Identification ==
Due to their complicated chloroplast morphology, described as a ‘peculiar chromatophore system’, the identification of E. sanguinea using microscopic techniques remains challenging. Therefore, methods based on molecular data need to be used for verification of the species.

In 2013, a MS/MS analysis was developed to identify and quantitate levels of euglenophycin in bodies of fresh water. To create the experimental standards for this analysis, euglenophycin was purified by high performance liquid chromatography (HPLC) from E. sanguinea clonal cultures which were isolated from the mortality events in North Carolina and Texas. Figure 1A shows the mass spectrometric analysis of purified euglenophycin (500 ng) and figure 1B of euglenophycin extracted from a culture of E. Sanguinea.

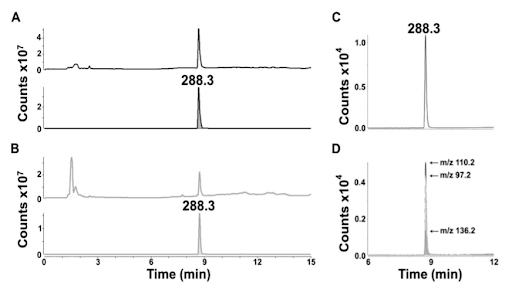
Figure 1. Mass spectrometric analysis of euglenophycin. A. Mass spectrum of 500 ng purified euglenophycin. B. Mass spectrum of euglenophycin extracted from a culture of E. sanguinea. C&D. Mass spectrum of 1 ng of euglenophycin.

For specific detection of euglenophycin a multiple reaction monitoring (MRM) method was developed. This method is based on three transitions: m/z 288.3 to m/z 97.2, 110.2 and 136.2. Of these three transitions, m/z 110.2 was chosen to be the quantifier ion, as it was the most intense product ion. Figure 1C and 1D present the detection of 1 ng of euglenophycin.

Another method to monitor freshwater ponds is the polymerase chain reaction (PCR) test. In 2017, this test was refined to specifically detect euglenophycin in waters populated by E. sanguinea blooms. This was done based on the significantly long SSU rDNA sequences found in the algae species. By using nested PCR, non-specific binding can be reduced due to the amplification of unexpected primer binding sites. Specificity of this test was proven by the PCR results of species closely related to E. Sanguinea. No products were observed in these tests. Furthermore, additional information can be retrieved from the nucleotide sequence allowing for examination, classification and comparison of the sample.

In combination with mass spectrometric methods, PCR tests facilitate monitoring and risk assessment of fresh waters populated by E. sanguinea toxic blooms.

== Structure and reactivity ==
Euglenophycin produced by euglenoids is a disubstituted piperidine as it is constituted of a piperidine ring with a butanol side chain at the 6th position and a (1E,3E,7Z)-undeca-1,3,7-triene side chain at the 2nd position. The 2nd position side chain has a conjugated system giving it an absorbance at 238 nm. Both the 2nd and the 6th position in the piperidine ring are chiral centres and thus their combination determines the cis/trans-stereoisomerism of the compound. According to NMR analysis upon extraction, the majority of the euglenophycin produced by euglenoids is in the cis-conformation with respect to the 2nd and 6th position. The absolute cis/trans-stereoisomerism, however, remains to be discovered. Furthermore, each double bond is a centre of E/Z-stereoisomerism, which in combination with the cis/trans-stereoisomerism gives rise to a total of 12 stereoisomers (in theory).

Although the nitrogen and oxygen atoms are able to form hydrogen bonds, the compound is water insoluble and very stable in organic solvents, which is in accordance with its in silico predicted log(p) value of ~5.6. Remarkably, the structure of euglenophycin, except for the butanol side chain, is extremely similar to solenopsin the major constituent of fire ant venom. Therefore, the synthesis pathway, reactivity, chemical properties and toxicity of these compounds might resemble each other as well. The efficacy of solenopsin as an anti-cancer drug has prompted researchers to investigate the potential of euglenophycin for a similar drug as well. The section ‘mechanisms of action’ further elaborates on this aspect.

== Biosynthesis ==
Euglenophycin is very likely to be produced by enzymes known as polyketide synthases (PKSs), which are widely found in Euglenoids, as well as other algae that produce polyketides.

=== Structural similarity-based estimations on biosynthetic pathways ===
The mechanism by which euglenoids produce euglenophycin is not known yet. However, estimations can be done on this pathway due to euglenophycin's structural similarities to numerous other naturally occurring compounds, but such estimates must be regarded with the slightest care as these are not scientifically proven.

Although solenopsin produced by the fire ant exhibits high structural similarity to euglenophycin, it is not known if the synthesis pathways of these toxins are similar too, which might be the case if convergent evolution of this pathway has taken place.

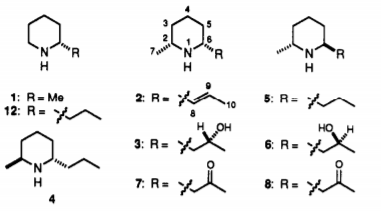
Figure 2. Toxic pine and spruce alkaloids. The figure depicts the various structures that belong to the toxic pine (Pinus) and spruce (Picea) toxic alkaloids of polyketide origin. They share the same piperidine nucleus, but vary in their side chains (represented with ‘R’, labelled 1-8 and 12).

Interestingly, Jeanne N. Tawara et al (1993) has investigated toxic alkaloid piperidines from Pine (Pinus) and Spruce (Picea) trees, that are structurally similar to euglenophycin and that are of polyketide origin as well (Figure 2).

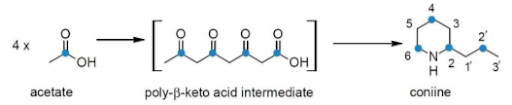
Figure 3. Proposed synthesis pathway of coniine, ‘the killer of Socrates’. This figure depicts the synthesis pathway of coniine as supposed by Hannu Hotti and Heike Rischer. The carbon atoms of coniine are labeled to indicate their position in the molecule. The conjugation of acetate units by polyketide synthase yields a polyketide intermediate (between brackets) as postulated.

Due to this outstanding similarity in both structures, except for the side chain, and origin, it is probable that the synthesis pathway of these compounds is related to that of euglenophycin, taking the evolutionary relationship between algae and trees into account. The same holds for coniine, also known as ‘the killer of Socrates’, which is another compound that appears to be even more similar to euglenophycin and has been investigated by Hannu Hotti and Heiko Rischer (Figure 3).

The investigators of both euglenophycin-resembling groups of compounds have attempted to elucidate the synthesis pathway. The synthesis pathways proposed by both teams of investigators greatly overlap and seem to be supplementary. First, it is proposed that acetate is conjugated to coenzyme A to form acetyl-CoA. This is subsequently converted into butyryl- and malonyl-CoA, the former of which being catalyzed by fatty acid synthetase (FAS). Then, a polyketide synthase couples these two compounds to form a polyketide intermediate, whose exact structure has not been confirmed yet (Figure 3). This intermediate is then reduced into a keto acid and subsequently into a keto aldehyde. L-alanine:aminotransferase (AAT) then converts this latter compound into a keto amine compound that spontaneously cyclizes and is reduced into a substituted piperidine compound known as γ-coniceine (Figure 4).

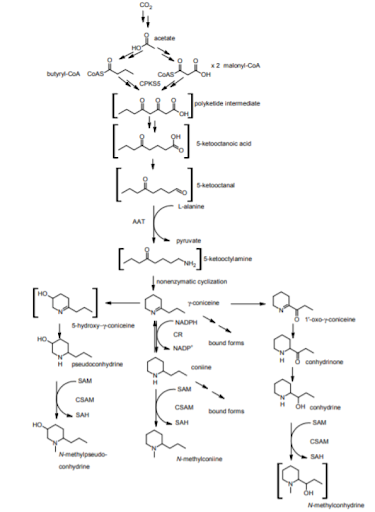
Figure 4. Proposed synthesis pathways of various Hemlock piperidines. Acetate units are conjugated to form a polyketide intermediate, which is reduced to a substrate for L-alanine:aminotransferase (AAT), which is converted into a keto amine. This keto amine spontaneously cyclizes into a piperidine named γ-coniceine. This product is a substrate for various enzymes that catalyze its conversion into the final hemlock toxin. Compounds of which the structure has not yet been determined are depicted between brackets.

Other enzymes may catalyze the addition of various side chains to these piperidines, yielding a range of piperidine-based compounds (Figure 4). The investigators of the pine and spruce tree toxins, have proposed a structure for the polyketide intermediate and have confirmed that the side chains of the piperidine are modified after cyclization. Research has not yet confirmed these synthesis pathways with a hundred percent confidence, however it is estimated that euglenoids employ the same mechanisms to produce euglenophycin.

== Toxicity ==
Before euglenophycin was identified, researchers observed that fish exposed to cells from E. sanguinea showed symptoms of disorientation, increased respiration and incapacity to maintain balance. These fish showed reddened gill tissue as well, but no haemorrhaging was found. Based on behavioural changes that came with these symptoms, it was suggested by American researchers that the toxin functions as a neurotoxin.

Immature catfish tested with algal fractions, by Zimba et al (2004), died within 2 hours of exposure. Later, Zimba et al (2009) confirmed these mortalities when catfish exposed to purified euglenophycin died within 30 min of exposure.

Although euglenophycin is produced in at least six other euglenoid species, E. sanguinea seems to be the only species to form a significant problem for aquaculture and therefore the economy. This is due to the fact that E. sanguinea forms much denser toxic blooms.

Zimba et al (2009) researched the toxicity of euglenophycin against five algae species: Oocystis polymorpha, Gonphonema parvulum, Microcystis aeruginosa, Planktothrix PCC7811 and Scenedesmus dimorphus. Euglenophycin hindered the growth of all five species and inhibition was significant at concentrations <300 ppb in all cases.

== Mechanisms of action ==
Although the synthesis of euglenophycin is not fully understood yet, experiments showed that euglenoids in culture produce euglenophycin independent from their growth state. This may be an indication that euglenophycin is part of a defence mechanism for the algae.

Euglenophycin was identified fairly recently so the exact mechanism remains unclear. However, euglenophycin is structurally very similar to solenopsin. Solenopsin is found in fire ant venom and the mechanism of solenopsin is much more investigated. The mechanisms of both euglenophycin and solenopsin are expected to be similar too.

The research into solenopsin and its mechanism of action is a great first indication of the mechanism of euglenophycin. In vitro research showed that solenopsin had an inhibiting effect on PI3K/AKT which are part of the mTOR pathway in mammalian cells. This pathway is used for several cellular processes such as cell growth, cell proliferation, the survival of the cell, synthesis of proteins, cell motility and autophagy.

The most recent studies showed that euglenophycin has some great anti-cancer potential. This may be caused by inhibiting the mTOR pathway because it is known that the mTOR pathway can have a significant effect on stimulating cancer cells when overactivated. Solenopsin and euglenophycin are both known to be able to inhibit the Pi3K protein. Pi3K activates AKT by phosphorylating it, which has a number of downstream effects. It activates the mTOR pathway, is involved in metabolic regulation and regulates cell cycle inhibitors. It allows proliferation and reduces apoptosis. It is overactive in many kinds of cancer. However, this pathway is necessary to promote the growth and differentiation of adult (often neural) stem cells.

Experiments have shown that euglenophycin also has anti-angiogenesis effects. Euglenophycin can inhibit VEGF (vascular endothelial growth factor) and thus prevent new veins to be constructed to provide growing tumours with oxygen and nutrients. When tumours start to grow they need extra oxygen and nutrients. By cutting off their supply the tumours can be prevented before they can grow and spread to other parts of the body.

Cabang et al (2017) reported that the anti-proliferative effect of euglenophycin is induced by its ability to put cells in G1 cell cycle arrest. Cell cycle arrest happens when a cell in the cell cycle is checked for errors and a mistake is found. Cells need to duplicate perfectly, if this is not the case the cell cycle is put on hold and the cell does not duplicate. This is to prevent malfunctioning cells from growing in a healthy person.
