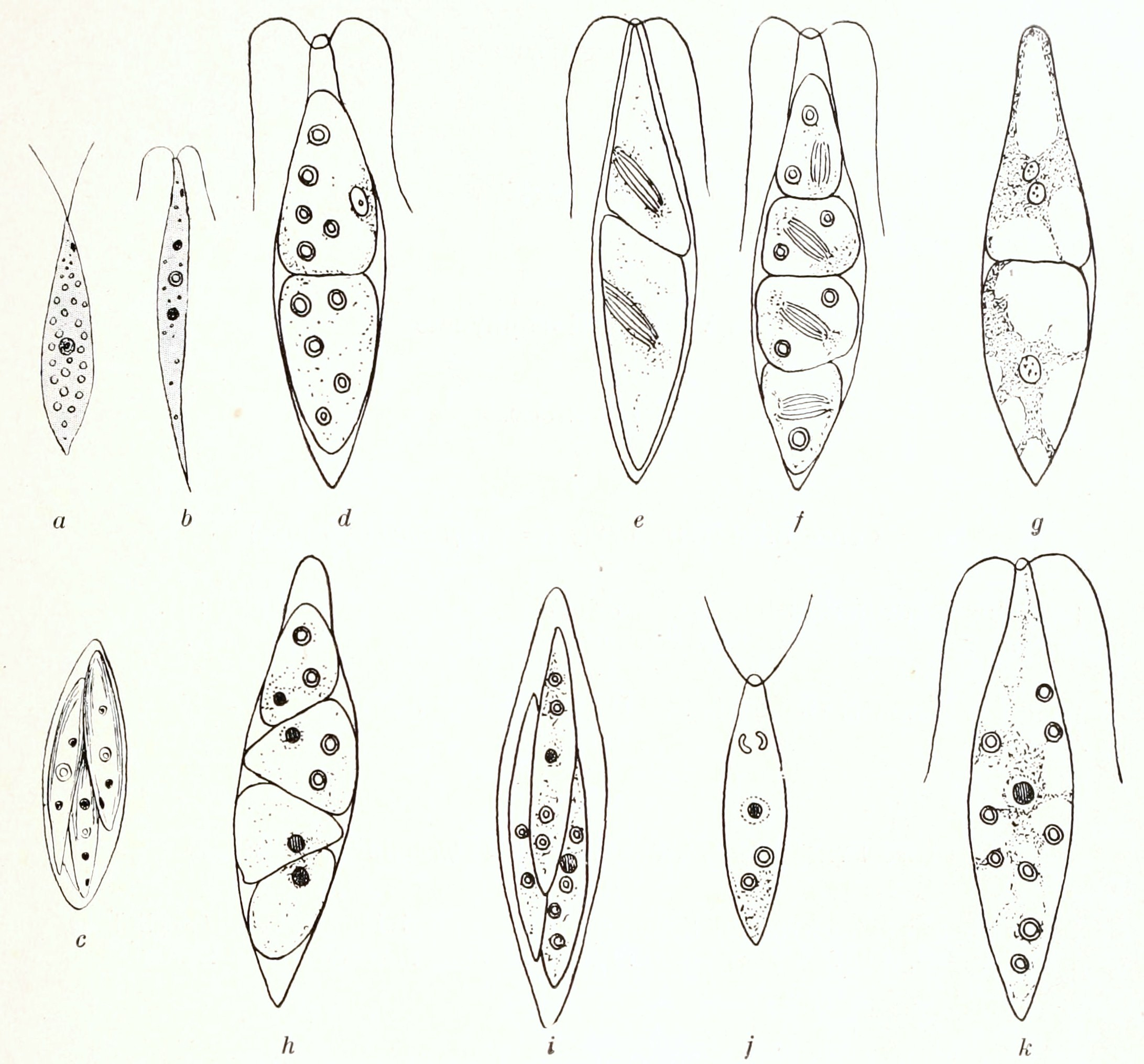
- Chlorogonium euchlorum

Scientific classification
- Kingdom: Plantae
- Division: Chlorophyta
- Class: Chlorophyceae
- Order: Chlamydomonadales
- Family: Haematococcaceae
- Genus: Chlorogonium; Ehrenberg, 1836

Species
- Chlorogonium capillatum; Chlorogonium elegans; Chlorogonium elongatum; Chlorogonium euchlorum; Chlorogonium fusiforme; Chlorogonium neglectum; Chlorogonium kasakii

= Chlorogonium =

Genus of algae

Chlorogonium is a genus of green algae in the family Haematococcaceae. It was first described by Christian Gottfried Ehrenberg in 1837, with the type species Chlorogonium euchlorum; currently, around 30 species are accepted. They are found in freshwater habitats worldwide.

== Description ==
Chlorogonium consists of spindle-shaped or otherwise elongated cells, with two short, equal flagella at the anterior end of the cell. Each cell contains more than three contractile vacuoles scattered throughout the cytoplasm. There is a single chloroplast in the cell, which is parietal or spiral, filling most of the cell. Pyrenoids are normally present, but in some conditions (such as in photoheterotrophic medium), some species do not produce pyrenoids. At the center of the cell is a single nucleus. The chloroplast generally has a prominent reddish eyespot in the anterior of the cell.

Chlorogonium sensu stricto is characterized by a combination of ultrastructural features, mainly detectable via transmission electron microscopy. Pyrenoids are spherical to nearly angular in shape, and are covered in fragmented starch plates, and have tubular thylakoid membranes penetrating the pyrenoid matrix. The stigma of Chlorogonium is composed of multiple reddish globules, arranged in a single layer.

=== Reproduction ===
Asexual reproduction in Chlorogonium occurs by the formation of zoospores (termed zoosporogenesis). Four or eight zoospores (rarely two) are produced per sporangium (parent cell). During zoospore production, the first division is transverse so that one of the daughter protoplasts retains the original flagellar apparatus and stigma. After the first division, the protoplasts divide once or twice more, eventually becoming elongated. During zoosporogenesis, the sporangium retains flagella and is motile. Zoospores escape through the dissolution of the parental cell wall.

Sexual reproduction has been observed in various Chlorogonium species, and ranges from isogamous to oogamous. The zygotes are spherical with a thick, flattened wall.

== Habitat ==
Chlorogonium is found in freshwater habitats worldwide, or soil. It most common in bodies of water that are nutrient-poor, dystrophic or filled with decaying leaves. It is most abundant in winter.

Chlorogonium has a notable mutualistic relationship with the American toad, allowing the tadpoles to develop faster when covered with the algae.

== Taxonomy and identification ==
The taxonomic history of Chlorogonium is very complex. It was first delimited from Chlamydomonas in cell shape, since Chlorogonium generally has elongate, fusiform cells while Chlamydomonas has globose to ellipsoid cells. In 1958, Hanuš Ettl delimited the Chlorogonium based on having multiple scattered contractile vacuoles (while Chlamydomonas has two apical contractile vacuoles). Since young cells of Chlorogonium have only two contractile vacuoles and marine species lack them altogether, this diagnostic character was discarded and most authors considered the mode of cell division as diagnostic for separating the two. In Chlamydomonas, division is longitudinal and each daughter protoplast forms its own flagella, whereas in Chlorogonium division is transverse and one daughter protoplast retains the original flagella.

The most current circumscription of Chlorogonium involves both molecular and morphological data. This has led to the traditional morphologically defined Chlorogonium being recognized as paraphyletic, and the splitting of Chlorogonium into several genera, including Gungnir, Rusalka, Tabris, and Hamakko. Morphological features separating these genera include: 1) number of contractile vacuoles and pyrenoids, 2) morphology of the starch plates surrounding the pyrenoids, 3) morphology of the thylakoids penetrating the pyrenoids, and 4) the number of layers of globules forming the stigma.

Within Chlorogonium, species delimitation depends on the number of pyrenoids (and their presence/absence in photoheterotrophic growth conditions), size, shape, and position of the nucleus. However, many species of Chlorogonium have not been investigated with molecular or ultrastructural methods, so their taxonomic statuses are unknown.

Morphological and ultrastructural characters in Chlorogonium and similar genera
Character	Chlorogonium sensu stricto	Gungnir	Rusalka	Tabris	Hamakko
Number of contractile vacuoles	4+	3+	2 or 3	2	4+
Position of contractile vacuoles	Irregularly distributed	Irregularly distributed	Irregularly distributed	Apical	Irregularly distributed
Number of pyrenoids	2 to many	1 to many	1	0	1
Starch plates covering pyrenoids	Fragmented	Fragmented	Unfragmented	–	Fragmented
Thylakoid membranes penetrating pyrenoids	Present, tubular	–	Present, tubular	–	Present, flattened
Position of nucleus	Among pyrenoids	Among pyrenoids	Posterior to pyrenoid	Central	Among pyrenoids
Number of layers of globules in stigma	1	2	1	1	1

== See also ==
- Chlorococcum amblystomatis, a similar amphibian mutualistic alga
