= Akinete =

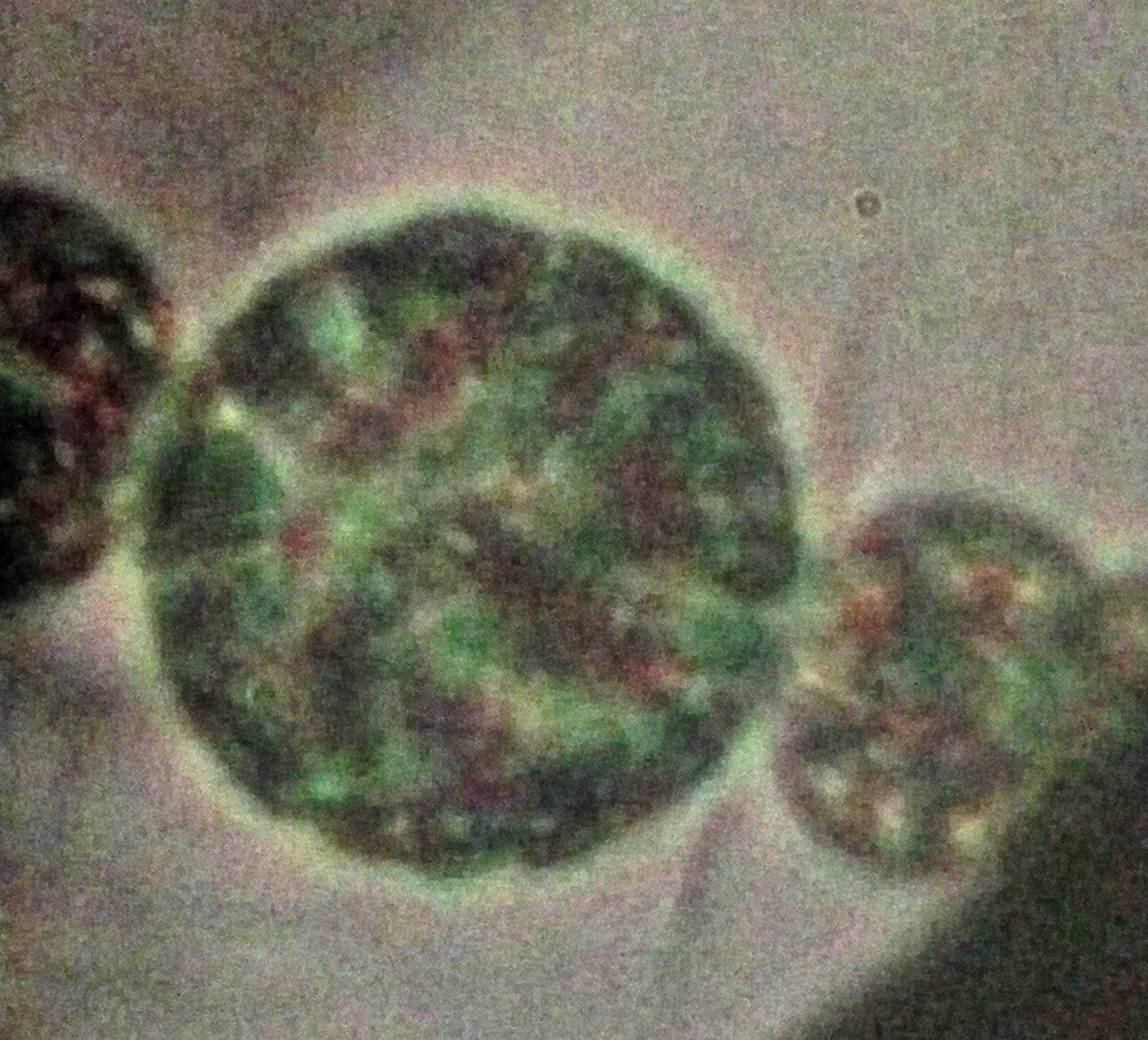
Intercalary located akinete of Dolichospermum smithii

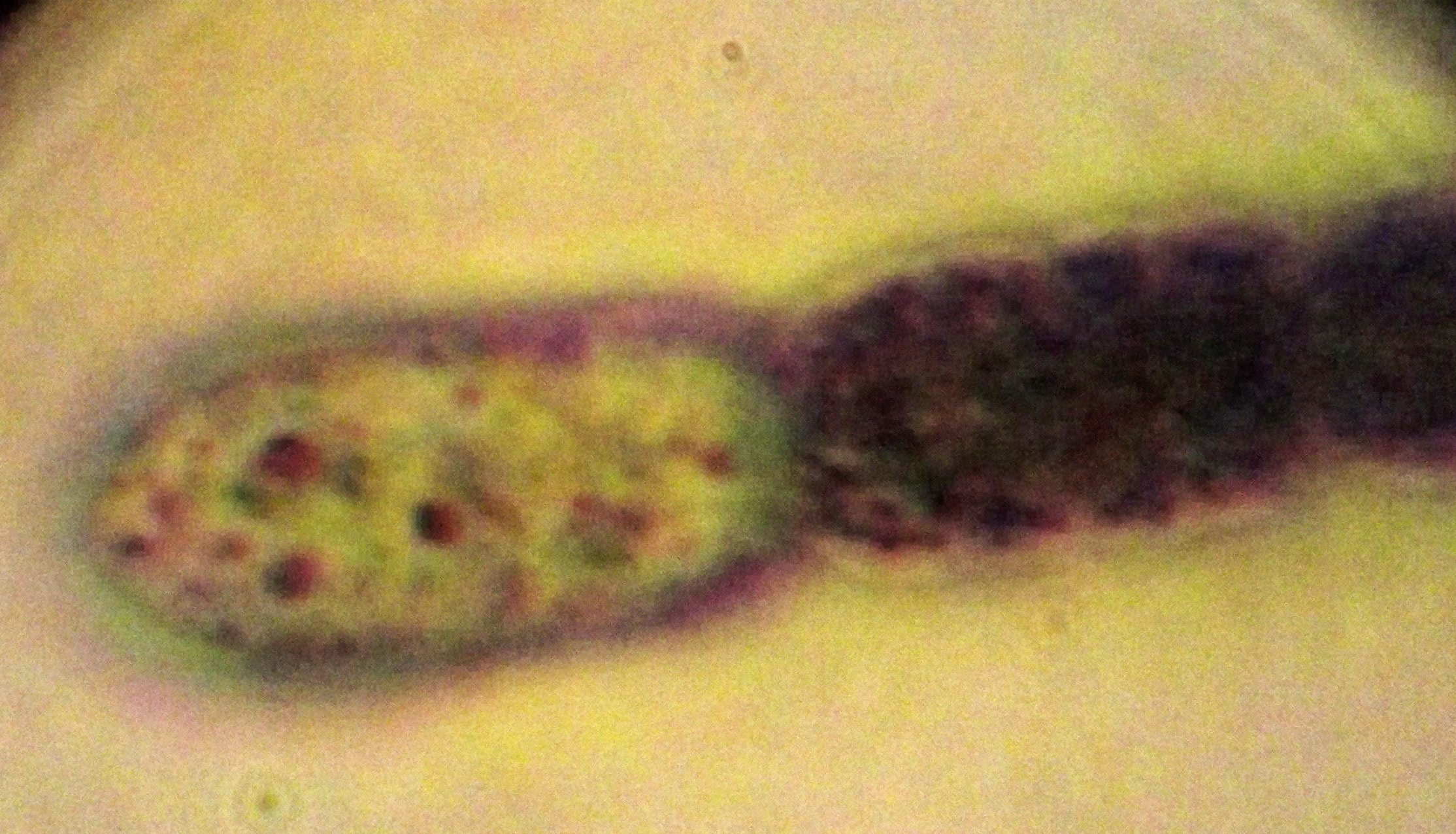
Terminally located akinete of Gloeotrichia

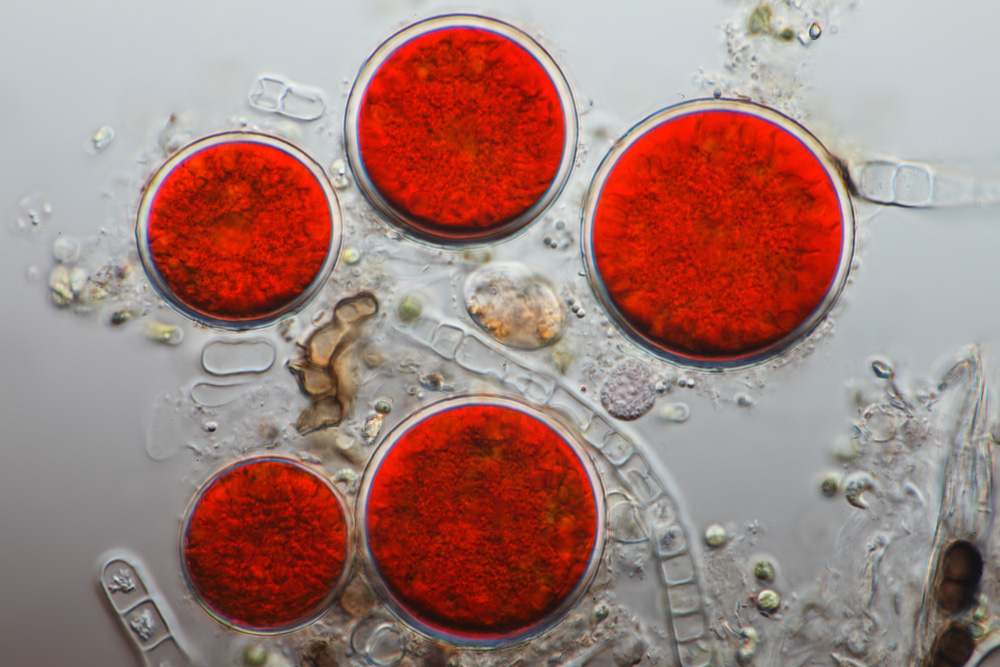
Akinetes, also termed "cysts", of Haematococcus

An akinete is an enveloped, thick-walled, non-motile, dormant cell formed by both cyanobacteria and algae. Cyanobacterial akinetes are mainly formed by filamentous, heterocyst-forming members under the order Nostocales and Stigonematales. Eukaryotic microalgae also produce akinetes, such as Haematococcus.

During akinete formation, cells accumulate and store various essential material, allowing the akinete to serve as a survival structure for up to many years. The cell akinetes are resistant to cold and desiccation. However, akinetes are not resistant to heat. Once conditions become more favorable for growth, the akinete can then germinate back into a vegetative cell. Increased light intensity, nutrient availability, oxygen availability, and changes in salinity are important triggers for germination.

In cyanobacteria, akinetes usually develop in strings with each cell differentiating after another and this occurs next to heterocysts if they are present. Development usually occurs during stationary phase and is triggered by unfavorable conditions such as insufficient light or nutrients, temperature, and saline levels in the environment. In comparison to vegetative cells, akinetes are generally larger. This is associated with the accumulation of nucleic acids which is important for both dormancy and germination of the akinete. Despite being a resting cell, it is still capable of some metabolic activities such as photosynthesis, protein synthesis, and carbon fixation, albeit at significantly lower levels.

Akinetes can remain dormant for extended periods of time. Studies have shown that some species could be cultured that from akinetes were 18 and 64 years old. Akinete formation also influences the perennial blooms of cyanobacteria.

In algae, akinetes form when environmental signals indicate impending change unfavorable to growth, such as the arrival of winter. Like cyanobacterial akinetes, they accumulate storage materials, but also develop thick cell walls and suspend active metabolism. When conditions improve, the akinete germinates via the cell wall breaking open.
