= Euglena sanguinea =

Scientific classification
- Domain: Eukaryota
- Clade: Discoba
- Phylum: Euglenozoa
- Class: Euglenida
- Clade: Euglenophyceae
- Order: Euglenales
- Family: Euglenaceae
- Genus: Euglena
- Species: E. sanguinea

Binomial name
- Euglena sanguinea Ehrenberg, 1830

Species of single cell flagellate eukaryotes

Euglena sanguinea is a species of euglenid of the genus Euglena. It is a single-celled alga that is found in freshwater habitats, and has a cosmopolitan distribution. As the specific epithet sanguinea suggests, it is often coloured red due to the presence of astaxanthin, and the cells can be populous enough to form blooms that colour the water red.

== Description ==
Euglena sanguinea is a single-celled organism, with cells 61–150 μm long and 17–35 μm wide. The cells are spindle-shaped with a rounded anterior and a pointed posterior; the cell is surrounded by a pellicle which is spirally striated. Each cell has numerous (>15) chloroplasts in the shape of highly concave plates. Chloroplasts are in the shape of highly concave plates and are deeply dissected into long, ribbon-like bands which follow the contour of the cell and form spiral rows. The center of each chloroplast is embedded deeper inside the cell, and contains a single double-sheathed pyrenoid. Spindle-shaped mucocysts are visible in the cell. The flagellum is usually about 1.5 times or twice as long as the cell. An eyespot (stigma) is present and fairly large, near the base of the flagellum.

== Chemistry ==
Euglena sanguinea often produces granules of red pigment called astaxanthin (also known as hematochrome). The pigment is used to protect the chloroplasts from light that is too intense, but as the light levels change the cells can take on a green colour as the red pigment is moved to the centre of the cells.

Some strains of Euglena sanguinea are known to produce the alkaloid toxin euglenophycin. It is the first known case of an euglenid producing toxins. Euglenophycin is a potent ichthyotoxin that is very similar in structure to solenopsin, a alkaloid that is found in fire ant venom. Euglena sanguinea that is able to form toxic blooms that cause mortality in fish farms.
