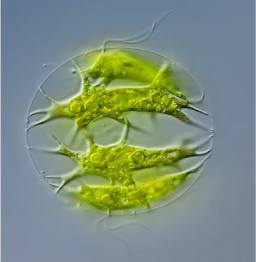
- Stephanosphaera pluvialis

Scientific classification
- Clade: Viridiplantae
- Division: Chlorophyta
- Class: Chlorophyceae
- Order: Chlamydomonadales
- Family: Haematococcaceae
- Genus: Stephanosphaera; Cohn
- Species: S. pluvialis

Binomial name
- Stephanosphaera pluvialis Cohn

= Stephanosphaera =

Genus of algae

Stephanosphaera is a genus of green algae in the family Haematococcaceae, containing the single species Stephanosphaera pluvialis. It forms colonies of flagellated cells. Although it was once placed in the family Volvocaceae, it is not closely related to them; its sister is the unicellular genus Balticola. The name comes from the Greek roots stephanos, meaning "crown", and sphaira, meaning "ball".

== Description ==
Stephanosphaera pluvialis forms colonies of four or eight cells, arranged in a ring and surrounded by a spherical matrix. Each cell is elongated, irregularly shaped with several protrusions that join the cells together. Cells contain several contractile vacuoles, a rounded stigma, and a single large parietal chloroplast with usually two pyrenoids. Cells have two flagella of equal length.

== Reproduction ==
Stephanosphaera pluvialis reproduces both asexually and sexually. Asexual reproduction occurs by autocolony formation: a cell divides until it becomes like a miniature version of the existing colony, and the new colony is released from the cell. Sexual reproduction is done with gametes, which are isogamous.

== Distribution ==
Stephanosphaera pluvialis is found in freshwater habitats. It tends to occur in rainwater puddles on non-basic rocks, more rarely in lakes. It is rare.
