= Haematococcus privus =

Scientific classification
- Kingdom: Plantae
- Division: Chlorophyta
- Class: Chlorophyceae
- Order: Chlamydomonadales
- Family: Haematococcaceae
- Genus: Haematococcus
- Species: H. privus

Binomial name
- Haematococcus privus Buchheim 2023

Species of algae

Haematococcus privus is a species of green algae in the family Haematococcaceae. This species is exclusively found in North America.
