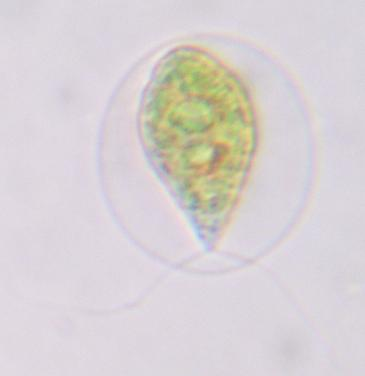
- Haematococcus

Scientific classification
- Clade: Viridiplantae
- Division: Chlorophyta
- Class: Chlorophyceae
- Order: Chlamydomonadales
- Family: Haematococcaceae; G.M.Smith

Genera
- Balticola; Chlorogonium; Gungnir; Haematococcus; Hyalogonium; Rusalka; Stephanosphaera

= Haematococcaceae =

Family of algae

Haematococcaceae is a family of green algae in the order Chlamydomonadales. It consists of freshwater algae such as Chlorogonium, Haematococcus and Stephanosphaera.

Members of the family Haematococcaceae have cells with are spindle-shaped to needle-shaped, or ellipsoidal to spherical. Cells are solitary, except for Stephanosphaera which is coenobial. The cell wall is usually separated from the protoplast, and connected to it by thin or thick strands. Two or many scattered, irregular contractile vacuoles are present. Some members accumulate hematochrome (carotenoid pigments) in their cells.

Asexual reproduction occurs via the formation of zoospores. During zoospore formation, the protoplast first divides transversely; a similar pattern applies to gamete formation.

Haematococcaceae is polyphyletic, containing members from the clades Stephanosphaerinia and Chlorogonia.

== See also ==
- Algaculture
- Astaxanthin
