= Justin Girod-Chantrans =

French naturalist (1750–1841)

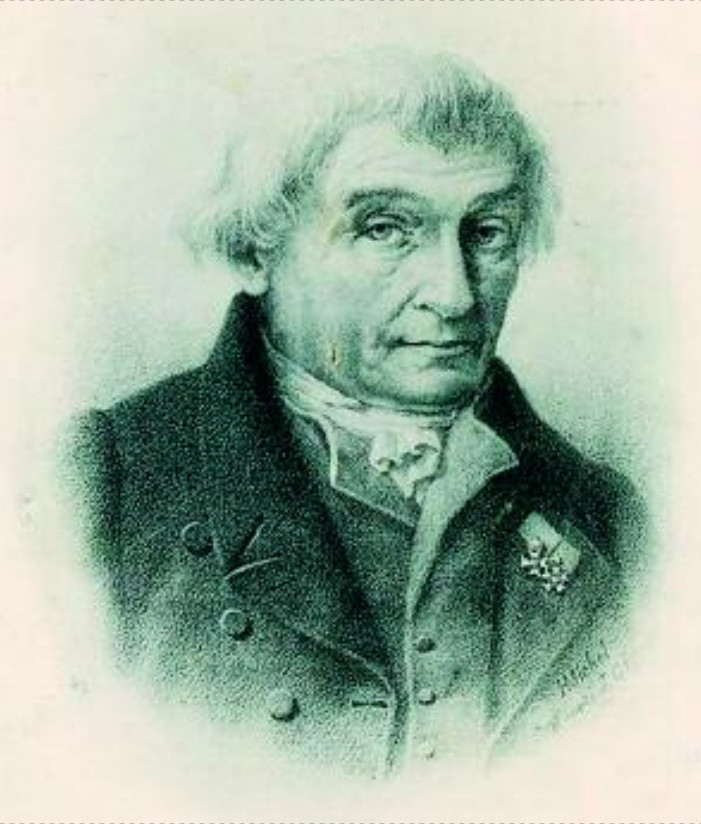
Justin Girod-Chantrans in 1827

Justin Girod-Chantrans (26 September 1750 in Besançon – 1 April 1841 in Besançon) was a French naturalist known for his pioneering research in the field of phycology.

Following studies with the Jesuits, he entered the Ecole du Génie militaire in 1768. He attained the title of captain in 1777, and subsequently served at various military posts, including Saint-Domingue, until 1791. Around 1786, he developed an interest in natural history.

In 1799 he founded the Société d'agriculture, commerce et arts in Besançon. He then became involved in politics, and was elected to the legislature in 1802. From 1810 on, he devoted all his time and energy to the natural sciences.

He described a number of phycological species, including Haematococcus lacustris, Volvox lacustris and Conferva mammiformis.

== Principal works ==
- Voyage d'un Suisse dans différentes colonies d'Amérique pendant la dernière guerre, : avec une table d'observations météorologiques faites à Saint-Domingue. (1785) - Voyage to different American colonies during the last war, with a meteorological table made at Saint Domingue.
- Recherches chimiques et microscopiques sur les conferves, bisses, tremelles, etc. (1802) - Chemical and microscopic research of Tremella, etc.
- Essai sur la géographie physique, le climat et l'histoire naturelle du département du Doubs (1810) - Essay on the physical geography, climate and natural history of the département Doubs.
