= Hematochrome =

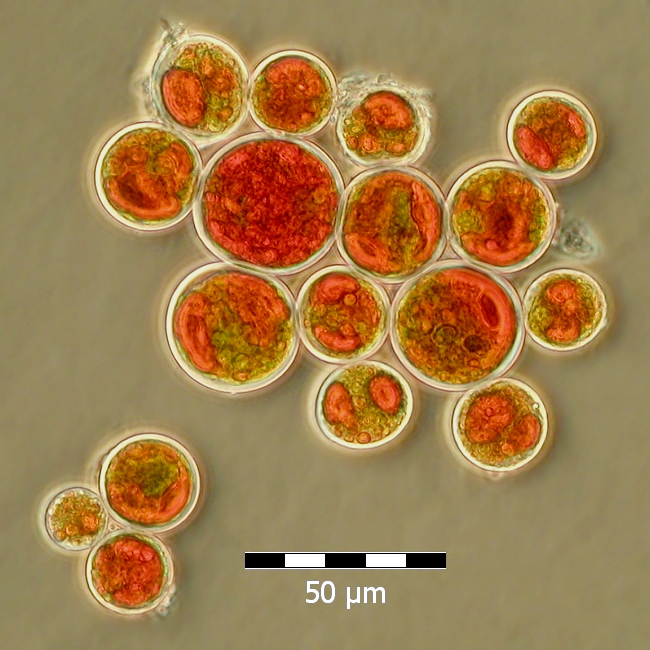
Haematococcus, with carotenoid pigments

Hematochrome is a yellow, orange, or (most commonly) red biological pigment present in some green algae, especially when exposed to intense light. It is a name used mainly in older literature. Hematochrome is a mixture of carotenoid pigments and their derivates.
