= Astaxanthin =

Chemical compound

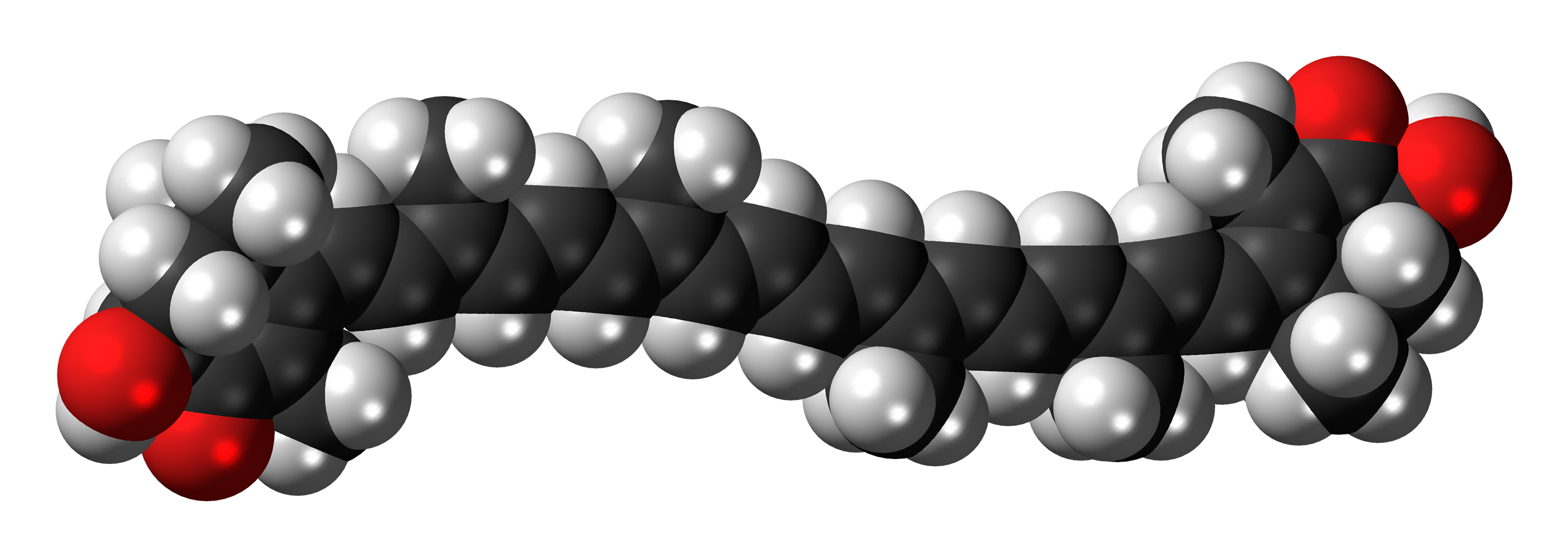

Names
- IUPAC name (3S,3′S)-3,3′-Dihydroxy-β,β-carotene-4,4′-dione
- Systematic IUPAC name (6S,6′S)-3,3′-[(1E,3E,5E,7E,9E,11E,13E,15E,17E)-3,7,12,16-Tetramethyloctadeca-1,3,5,7,9,11,13,15,17-nonaene-1,18-diyl]bis(6-hydroxy-2,4,4-trimethylcyclohex-2-en-1-one)
- Other names: β-Carotene-4,4'-dione, 3,3'-dihydroxy-, all-trans-; (3S,3'S)-Astaxanthin; (3S,3'S)-Astaxanthin; (3S,3'S)-all-trans-Astaxanthin; (S,S)-Astaxanthin; Astaxanthin, all-trans-; all-trans-Astaxanthin; trans-Astaxanthin; Ovoester

Identifiers
CAS Number	472-61-7
3D model (JSmol)	Interactive image
ChEBI	CHEBI:40968
ChEMBL	ChEMBL445751
ChemSpider	4444636
ECHA InfoCard	100.006.776
E number	E161j (colours)
PubChem CID	5281224
UNII	8XPW32PR7I
CompTox Dashboard (EPA)	DTXSID00893777
- InChI: InChI=1S/C40H52O4/c1-27(17-13-19-29(3)21-23-33-31(5)37(43)35(41)25-39(33,7)8)15-11-12-16-28(2)18-14-20-30(4)22-24-34-32(6)38(44)36(42)26-40(34,9)10/h11-24,35-36,41-42H,25-26H2,1-10H3/b12-11+,17-13+,18-14+,23-21+,24-22+,27-15+,28-16+,29-19+,30-20+/t35-,36-/m0/s1 Key: MQZIGYBFDRPAKN-UWFIBFSHSA-N; InChI=1/C40H52O4/c1-27(17-13-19-29(3)21-23-33-31(5)37(43)35(41)25-39(33,7)8)15-11-12-16-28(2)18-14-20-30(4)22-24-34-32(6)38(44)36(42)26-40(34,9)10/h11-24,35-36,41-42H,25-26H2,1-10H3/b12-11+,17-13+,18-14+,23-21+,24-22+,27-15+,28-16+,29-19+,30-20+ Key: MQZIGYBFDRPAKN-QISQUURKBE; InChI=1/C40H52O4/c1-27(17-13-19-29(3)21-23-33-31(5)37(43)35(41)25-39(33,7)8)15-11-12-16-28(2)18-14-20-30(4)22-24-34-32(6)38(44)36(42)26-40(34,9)10/h11-24,35-36,41-42H,25-26H2,1-10H3/b12-11+,17-13+,18-14+,23-21+,24-22+,27-15+,28-16+,29-19+,30-20+/t35-,36-/m0/s1 Key: MQZIGYBFDRPAKN-UWFIBFSHBJ
- SMILES: O=C2\C(=C(\C=C\C(=C\C=C\C(=C\C=C\C=C(\C=C\C=C(\C=C\C1=C(\C(=O)[C@@H](O)CC1(C)C)C)C)C)C)C)C(C)(C)C[C@@H]2O)C

Properties
Chemical formula	C_{40}H_{52}O_{4}
Molar mass	596.852 g·mol^{−1}
Appearance	red solid powder
Density	1.071 g/mL
Melting point	216 °C (421 °F; 489 K)
Boiling point	774 °C (1,425 °F; 1,047 K)
Solubility	30 g/L in DCM; 10 g/L in CHCl_{3}; 0.5 g/L in DMSO; 0.2 g/L in acetone

Pharmacology
Legal status	AU:
- Except where otherwise noted, data are given for materials in their standard state (at 25 °C [77 °F], 100 kPa). verify (what is ?) Infobox references

Astaxanthin /æstəˈzænθɪn/ is a keto-carotenoid within a group of chemical compounds known as carotenoids, a subclass of the broad group of phytochemicals known as terpenes. Astaxanthin is a metabolite of zeaxanthin and canthaxanthin, containing both hydroxyl and ketone functional groups.

It is a lipid-soluble pigment with red coloring properties, which result from the extended chain of conjugated (alternating double and single) double bonds at the center of the compound. The presence of the hydroxyl functional groups and the hydrophobic hydrocarbons render the molecule amphiphilic.

Astaxanthin is produced naturally in the freshwater microalgae Haematococcus pluvialis, the yeast fungus Xanthophyllomyces dendrorhous (also known as Phaffia rhodozyma) and the bacteria Paracoccus carotinifaciens. When the algae are stressed by lack of nutrients, increased salinity, or excessive sunshine, they create astaxanthin. Animals who feed on the algae, such as salmon, red trout, red sea bream, flamingos, and crustaceans (shrimp, krill, crab, lobster, and crayfish), subsequently reflect the red-orange astaxanthin pigmentation.

Astaxanthin is used as a dietary supplement for human, animal, and aquaculture consumption. Astaxanthin from algae, synthetic and bacterial sources is generally recognized as safe in the United States. The US Food and Drug Administration has approved astaxanthin as a food coloring (or color additive) for specific uses in animal and fish foods. The European Commission considers it as a food dye with E number E161j. The European Food Safety Authority has set an Acceptable Daily Intake of 0.2 mg per kg body weight, as of 2019. As a food color additive, astaxanthin and astaxanthin dimethyldisuccinate are restricted for use in Salmonid fish feed only.

== Natural sources ==
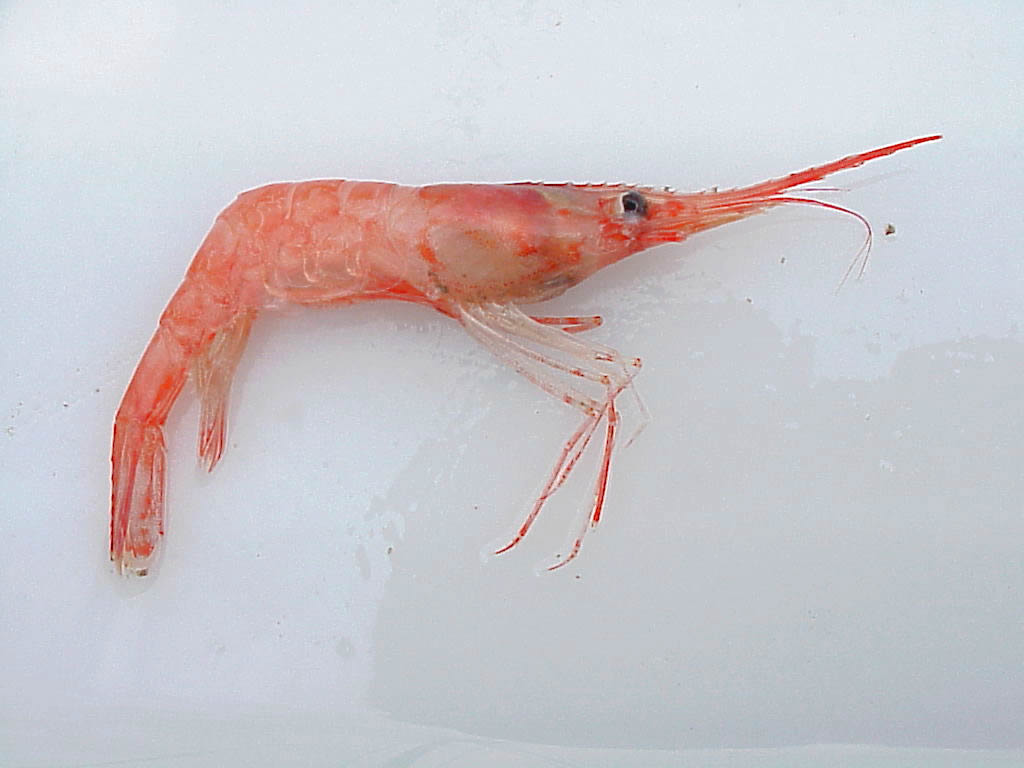
The shell and smaller parts of the bodily tissue of Pandalus borealis (Arctic shrimp) are colored red by astaxanthin, and are used and sold as an extractable source of astaxanthin.

A Haematococcus pluvialis cyst filled with astaxanthin (red)

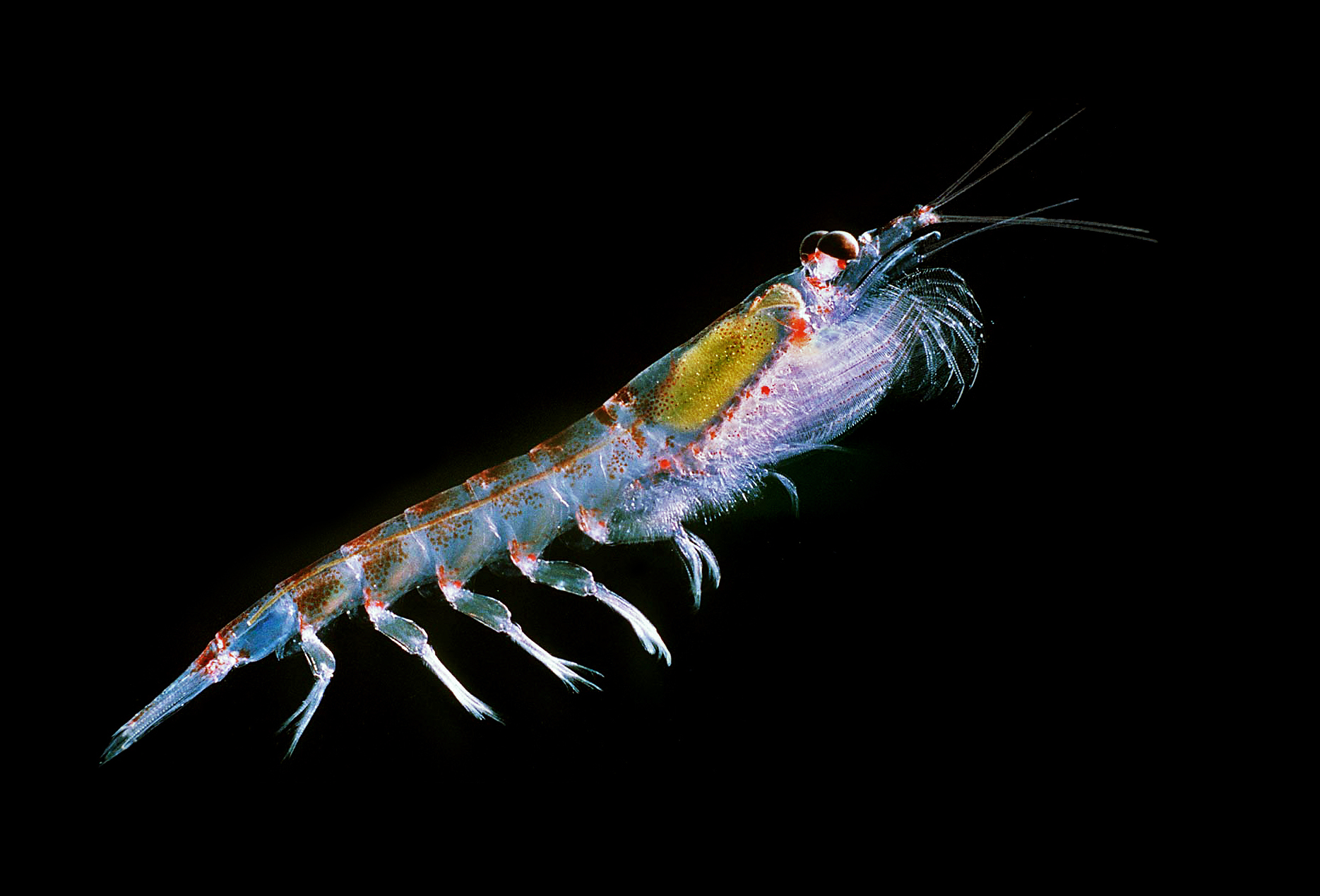
Krill also are used as an astaxanthin source.

Astaxanthin is present in most red-coloured aquatic organisms. The content varies from species to species, but also from individual to individual as it is highly dependent on diet and living conditions. Astaxanthin and other chemically related asta-carotenoids have also been found in a number of lichen species of the Arctic zone.

The primary natural sources for industrial production of astaxanthin comprise the following:

- Euphausia pacifica (Pacific krill)
- Euphausia superba (Antarctic krill)
- Haematococcus pluvialis (algae)
- Pandalus borealis (Arctic shrimp)

Astaxanthin concentrations in nature are approximately:

Source	Astaxanthin concentration (ppm)
Salmonids	~ 5
Plankton	~ 60
Krill	~ 120
Arctic shrimp (Pandalus borealis)	~ 1,200
Phaffia yeast	~ 10,000
Paracoccus carotinifaciens	~ 21,000
Haematococcus pluvialis	~ 40,000

Algae are the primary natural source of astaxanthin in the aquatic food chain. The microalgae Haematococcus pluvialis contains high levels of astaxanthin (about 3.8% of dry weight), and is the primary industrial source of natural astaxanthin.

In shellfish, astaxanthin is almost exclusively concentrated in the shells, with only low amounts in the flesh itself, and most of it only becomes visible during cooking as the pigment separates from the denatured proteins that otherwise bind it. Astaxanthin is extracted from Euphausia superba (Antarctic krill) and from shrimp processing waste.

== Biosynthesis ==
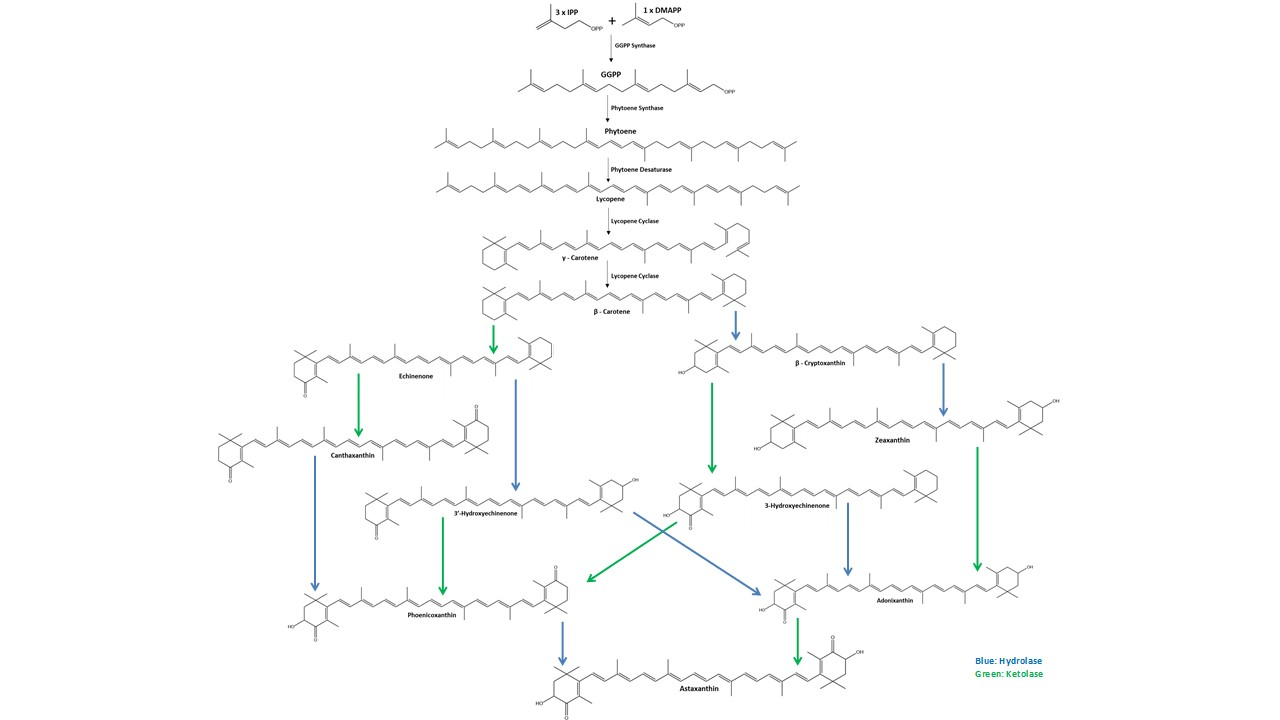
Astaxanthin biosynthesis starts with three molecules of isopentenyl pyrophosphate (IPP) and one molecule of dimethylallyl pyrophosphate (DMAPP) that are combined by IPP isomerase and converted to geranylgeranyl pyrophosphate (GGPP) by GGPP synthase. Two molecules of GGPP are then coupled by phytoene synthase to form phytoene. Next, phytoene desaturase creates four double bonds in the phytoene to form lycopene. Then, lycopene cyclase first forms γ-carotene then subsequently forms β-carotene. From β-carotene, hydrolases (blue) and ketolases (green) form multiple intermediate molecules until the final molecule, astaxanthin is obtained.

Astaxanthin biosynthesis starts with three molecules of isopentenyl pyrophosphate (IPP) and one molecule of dimethylallyl pyrophosphate (DMAPP) that are combined by IPP isomerase and converted to geranylgeranyl pyrophosphate (GGPP) by GGPP synthase. Two molecules of GGPP are then coupled by phytoene synthase to form phytoene. Next, phytoene desaturase creates four double bonds in the phytoene molecule to form lycopene. After desaturation, lycopene cyclase first forms γ-carotene by converting one of the ψ acyclic ends of the lycopene as a β-ring, then subsequently converts the other to form β-carotene. From β-carotene, hydrolases (blue) are responsible for the inclusion of two 3-hydroxy groups, and ketolases (green) for the addition of two 4-keto groups, forming multiple intermediate molecules until the final molecule, astaxanthin, is obtained.

== Synthetic sources ==
The structure of astaxanthin by synthesis was described in 1975. Nearly all commercially available astaxanthin for aquaculture is produced synthetically, with an annual market of about $1 billion in 2019.

An efficient synthesis from isophorone, cis-3-methyl-2-penten-4-yn-1-ol and a symmetrical C_{10}-dialdehyde has been discovered and is used in industrial production. It combines these chemicals together with an ethynylation and then a Wittig reaction. Two equivalents of the proper ylide combined with the proper dialdehyde in a solvent of methanol, ethanol, or a mixture of the two, yields astaxanthin in up to 88% yields.

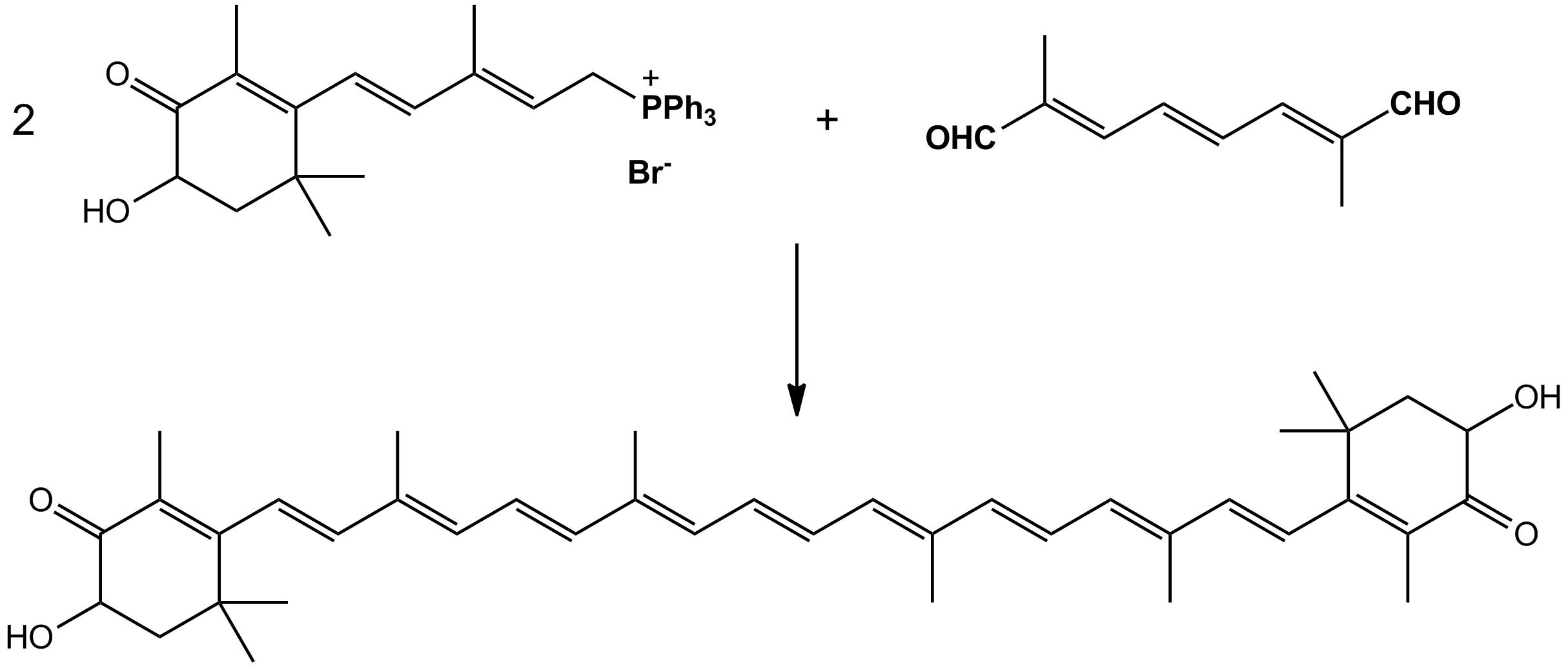
Synthesis of astaxanthin by Wittig reaction

== Metabolic engineering ==
The cost of astaxanthin extraction, high market price, and lack of efficient fermentation production systems, combined with the intricacies of chemical synthesis, discourage its commercial development. The metabolic engineering of bacteria (Escherichia coli) enables efficient astaxanthin production from beta-carotene via either zeaxanthin or canthaxanthin.

== Structure ==
=== Stereoisomers ===
In addition to structural isomeric configurations, astaxanthin also contains two chiral centers at the 3- and 3′-positions, resulting in three unique stereoisomers (3R,3′R and 3R,3'S meso and 3S,3'S). While all three stereoisomers are present in nature, relative distribution varies considerably from one organism to another. Synthetic astaxanthin contains a mixture of all three stereoisomers, in approximately 1:2:1 proportions.

=== Esterification ===
Astaxanthin exists in two predominant forms, non-esterified (yeast, synthetic) or esterified (algal) with various length fatty acid moieties whose composition is influenced by the source organism as well as growth conditions. The astaxanthin fed to salmon to enhance flesh coloration is in the non-esterified form The predominance of evidence supports a de-esterification of fatty acids from the astaxanthin molecule in the intestine prior to or concomitant with absorption resulting in the circulation and tissue deposition of non-esterified astaxanthin. European Food Safety Authority (EFSA) published a scientific opinion on a similar xanthophyll carotenoid, lutein, stating that "following passage through the gastrointestinal tract and/or uptake lutein esters are hydrolyzed to form free lutein again". While it can be assumed that non-esterified astaxanthin would be more bioavailable than esterified astaxanthin due to the extra enzymatic steps in the intestine needed to hydrolyse the fatty acid components, several studies suggest that bioavailability is more dependent on formulation than configuration.

== Uses ==
Astaxanthin is used as a dietary supplement and feed supplement as food colorant for salmon, crabs, shrimp, chickens and egg production.

=== For seafood and animals ===
The primary use of synthetic astaxanthin today is as an animal feed additive to impart coloration, including farm-raised salmon and chicken egg yolks. Synthetic carotenoid pigments colored yellow, red or orange represent about 15–25% of the cost of production of commercial salmon feed. In the 21st century, most commercial astaxanthin for aquaculture is produced synthetically.

In the United States, class action lawsuits were filed against some major grocery store chains for not clearly labeling the astaxanthin-treated salmon as "color added". The chains followed up quickly by labeling all such salmon as "color added". Litigation persisted with the suit for damages, but a Seattle judge dismissed the case, ruling that enforcement of the applicable food laws was up to government and not individuals.

=== Dietary supplement ===
The primary human application for astaxanthin is as a dietary supplement, and it remains under preliminary research. In 2020, the European Food Safety Authority reported that an intake of 8 mg astaxanthin per day from food supplements is safe for adults.

== Role in the food chain ==
Astaxanthin is a pigment that moves from algae to consumers, giving pink and red colors to animals like salmon, shrimp, and flamingos. Lobsters, shrimp, and some crabs turn red when cooked because the astaxanthin, which was bound to the protein in the shell, becomes free as the protein denatures and unwinds. The freed pigment is thus available to absorb light and produce the red color.

As a potent antioxidant, astaxanthin protects cells and membranes from oxidative damage caused by free radicals. This benefit is passed up the food chain to the animals that consume it.

== Regulations ==
In April 2009, the United States Food and Drug Administration approved astaxanthin as an additive for fish feed only as a component of a stabilized color additive mixture. Color additive mixtures for fish feed made with astaxanthin may contain only those diluents that are suitable. The color additives astaxanthin, ultramarine blue, canthaxanthin, synthetic iron oxide, dried algae meal, Tagetes meal and extract, and corn endosperm oil are approved for specific uses in animal foods. Haematococcus algae meal (21 CFR 73.185) and Phaffia yeast (21 CFR 73.355) for use in fish feed to color salmonoids were added in 2000. In the European Union, astaxanthin-containing food supplements derived from sources that have no history of use as a source of food in Europe, fall under the remit of the Novel Food legislation, EC (No.) 258/97. Since 1997, there have been five novel food applications concerning products that contain astaxanthin extracted from these novel sources. In each case, these applications have been simplified or substantial equivalence applications, because astaxanthin is recognised as a food component in the EU diet.
