= List of Ben-Gurion University of the Negev people =

The following is a list of presidents, rectors, and noted alumni and professors of Ben-Gurion University of the Negev in Be'er Sheva, Israel.

== Presidents ==
- Prof. Moshe Prywes 1973–1975
- Ambassador Yosef Tekoah 1975–1981
- Maj–Gen (Res.) Shlomo Gazit 1982–1985
- Prof. Chaim Elata 1985–1990
- MK Prof. Avishay Braverman 1990–2006
- Prof. Rivka Carmi 2006–2018
- Prof. Daniel Chamovitz 2019-

== Rectors ==
- Prof. Haim Hanani 1970–1973
- Prof. Zvi Pelah 1973–1974
- Prof. Moshe Rozen 1974–1979
- Prof. David Wolf 1979–1984
- Prof. Chaim Elata 1984–1986
- Prof. Avraham Tamir 1986–1990
- Prof. Dov Bahat 1990–1994
- Prof. Nahum Finger 1994–2002
- Prof. Jimmy Winblatt 2002–2010
- Prof. Zvi HaCohen 2010–2018
- Prof. Chaim Hames 2018-

== Notable faculty ==
- Aaron Antonovsky, sociologist
- Aharon Appelfeld, author
- Haim Be'er, author
- Jacob Bekenstein, theoretical physicist
- Ilana Krausman Ben-Amos, historian
- Gerald Blidstein, Jewish Philosophy – Israel Prize Recipient
- Dan Blumberg, geographer
- Rivka Carmi, pediatrician
- Daniel Chamovitz, plant biologist
- Miriam Cohen, mathematician
- Ute Deichmann, Science historian
- Shlomi Dolev, computer scientist
- David Faiman, solar engineer
- Yisrael Friedman, historian
- Tikva Frymer-Kensky, biblical scholar
- Neve Gordon, political scientist
- Chaim Hames, Historian
- Yitzhak Hen, historian
- Samuel Hollander, economist
- Klara Kedem, computer scientist
- Etgar Keret, author
- Howard Kreisel, philosopher
- Shaul Ladany, industrial engineering
- Michael Lin, mathematician
- Leslie Lobel, virologist
- Dan Meyerstein, chemist and president of Ariel University
- Benny Morris, historian
- David Newman, political geographer
- Amos Oz, author
- Renee Poznanski, political scientist and historian of the Holocaust in France
- Joshua Prawer, historian
- Addy Pross, Emeritus Professor of Chemistry
- Elisha Qimron, Hebrew scholar
- Eliahu Stern, geographer
- Aviad Raz, sociologist
- Danny Rubinstein, journalist
- Michael Segal, algorithmic networking
- Alice Shalvi, educator
- Richard Shusterman, philosopher
- Daniel Sivan, Hebrew literature professor
- Carsten Peter Thiede, biblical scholar
- Jacob Turkel, Israeli supreme court justice
- Oren Yiftachel, geographer
- Avishai Henik, psychologist
- Moti Herskowitz, chemical engineering
- Golan Shahar, clinical psychologist
- Ohad Birk, physician scientist
- Steven A Rosen, archaeologist
- Vered Slonim-Nevo, social work
- Yuval Golan, materials scientist
- Jiwchar Ganor, environmental scientist
- Joseph Kost, biomedical scientist
- Zvi HaCohen, organic chemistry
- Oded Lowengart, marketing
- Limor Aharonson-Daniel, injury epidemiology
- Yuval Elovici, computer and network security
- Amit Schejter, communication studies
- Ozer Schild (1930-2006), Danish-born Israeli academic, President of the University of Haifa and President of the College of Judea and Samaria ("Ariel College").
- Yuval Shahar, artificial intelligence and medical informatics
- Noam Weisbrod, hydrology
- Nirit Ben-Aryeh Debby, art history
- Abraham Zangen, neuroscience
- Yigal Meir, Physicist
- Harold J. Vinegar, geology

== Notable alumni ==
- Amal Elsana Alh'jooj (born 1972), Bedouin feminist and peace activist
- Muhammad Al-Nabari, mayor of Hura
- Orna Barbivai (born 1962) former Minister of Economy, and the former head of IDF Manpower Directorate
- Adam Berdichevsky (born 1983), Paralympic wheelchair tennis player
- Isaac Berzin (born 1967), chemical engineer
- Gilad Bracha
- Alon Chen (born 1970), neuroscientist; 11th President of the Weizmann Institute of Science
- Amira Dotan (born 1947), member of Knesset
- Shai Efrati (born 1971), physician and director of research center
- Varda Shalev, researcher and family physician
- Gila Gamliel (born 1974), member of Knesset
- Anastasia Gloushkov (born 1985), Olympic synchronized swimmer
- Arieh Iserles (born 1947), mathematician
- Ofer Lahav (born 1959), academic
- Hadas Malada-Matzri, M.D. (born 1984), first Ethiopian Israeli female doctor in the Israel Defense Forces
- Silvan Shalom (born 1958), Israeli minister
- Eliezer Shkedi (born 1957), CEO of El Al
- Yaakov Turner, mayor of Beersheba
- Mordechai Vanunu (born 1954), former nuclear technician and peace activist
- Shelly Yachimovich (born 1960), member of the Knesset, former leader of the Israeli Labor Party
- Michael W. Sonnenfeldt (born 1955)
- Tamar Zandberg (born 1976) member of Knesset
- Ofer Zwikael, management scientist, academic, and author
