= Limor =

Limor (Hebrew: לימור) is a Hebrew female given name, as well as a surname. Notable people with the name include:

- Limor Aharonson-Daniel, Israeli emergency preparedness expert
- Limor Blockman (born 1977), Israeli-American glamour model, and television personality
- Limor Fix, Israeli engineer
- Limor Fried, American electrical engineer
- Limor Friedman (born 1968), Israeli Olympic gymnast
- Limor Livnat (born 1950), Israeli politician
- Leemor Joshua-Tor (born 1961), Israeli professor of structural biology
- Limor Mizrachi (born 1970), Israeli basketball player
- Limor Magen Telem, Israeli politician
- Limor Schreibman-Sharir (born 1954), Israeli writer
- Limor Shifman, professor of communication at the Hebrew University of Jerusalem
- Limor Shmerling Magazanik, Israeli data governance expert
- Limor Son Har-Melech (born 1979), Israeli politician
- Limor Zaltz (born 1973), Israeli tennis player

== Fictional characters ==
- Limor, portrayed by Orna Banai in Israeli humorous TV shows
