= Shapira, Tel Aviv =

Neighborhood of southern Tel Aviv, Israel

Coordinates: 32°3′3.01″N 34°46′35.83″E

Shapira שפירא
- Neighborhood of Tel Aviv
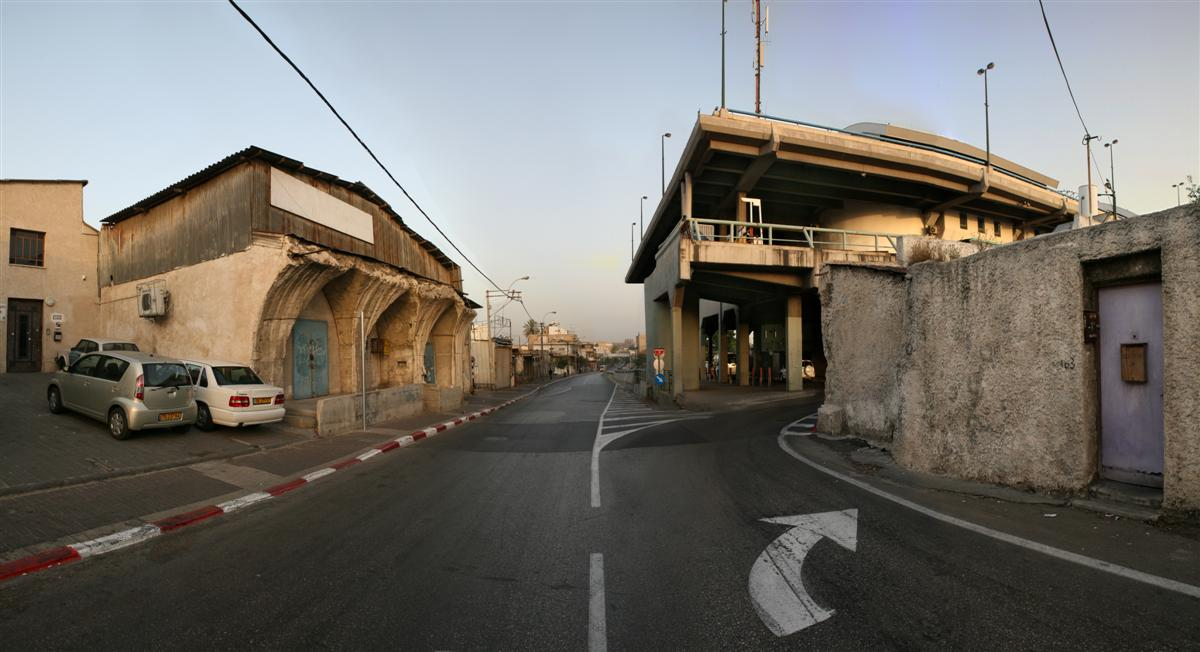
- Old well house near the Central bus station
- Interactive map of Shapira
- Country: Israel
- City: Tel Aviv
- Established: 1920s

Shapira (Hebrew: שכונת שפירא, romanized: Shechunat Shapira) is a neighborhood in south Tel Aviv, Israel with a population of 8,000. It is located south of the Tel Aviv Central Bus Station and extends to the Ayalon Highway in the east, Mount Zion Boulevard in the west, and to Kibbutz Galuyot Street in the south.

Shapira is home to a large community of migrants and foreign workers. In 2005, it was described as one of the most heterogeneous neighborhoods in Tel Aviv.

== History ==
=== Pre-1948 ===
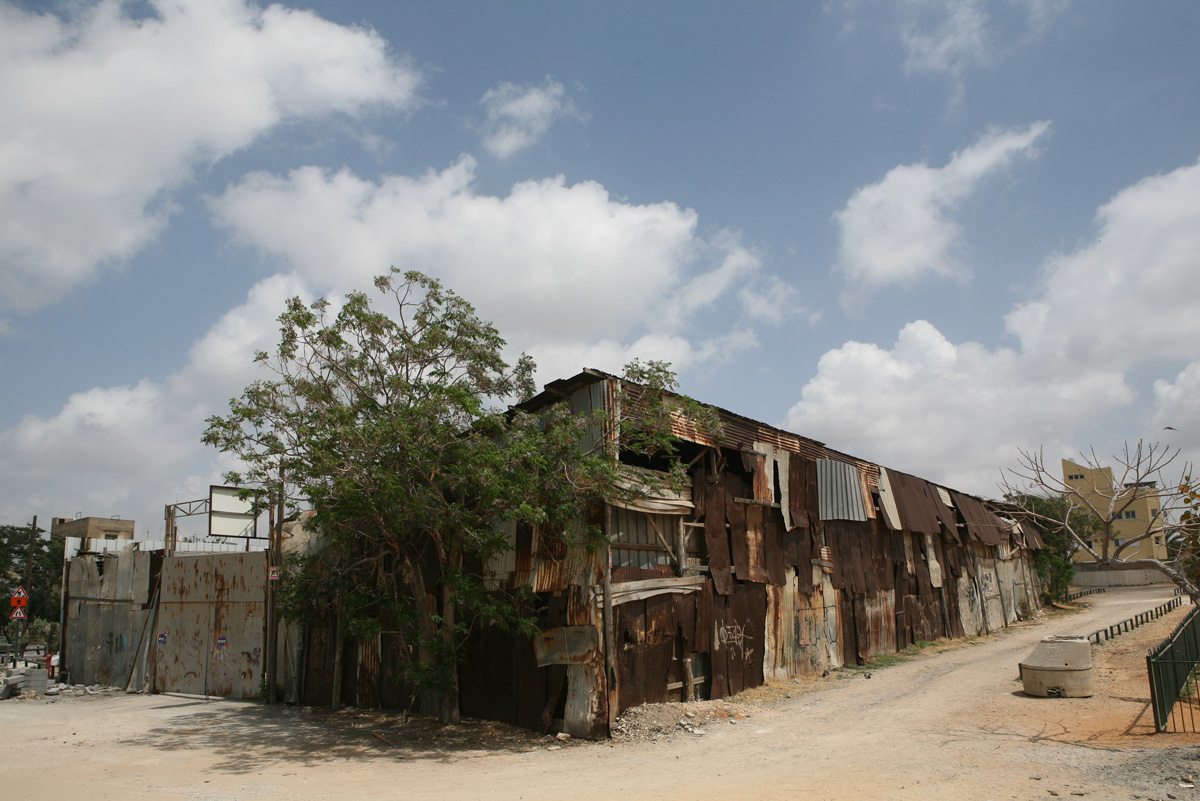
Tin shack in the neighbourhood (2009)

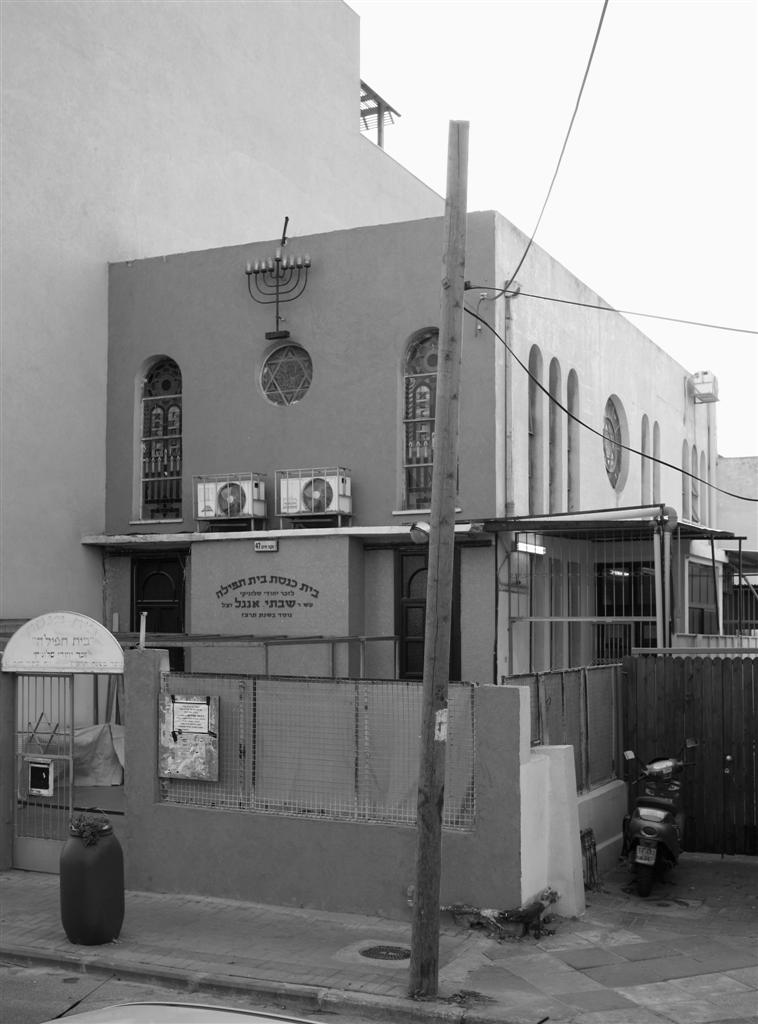
Thessaloniki's community Synagogue in the neighbourhood (2009)

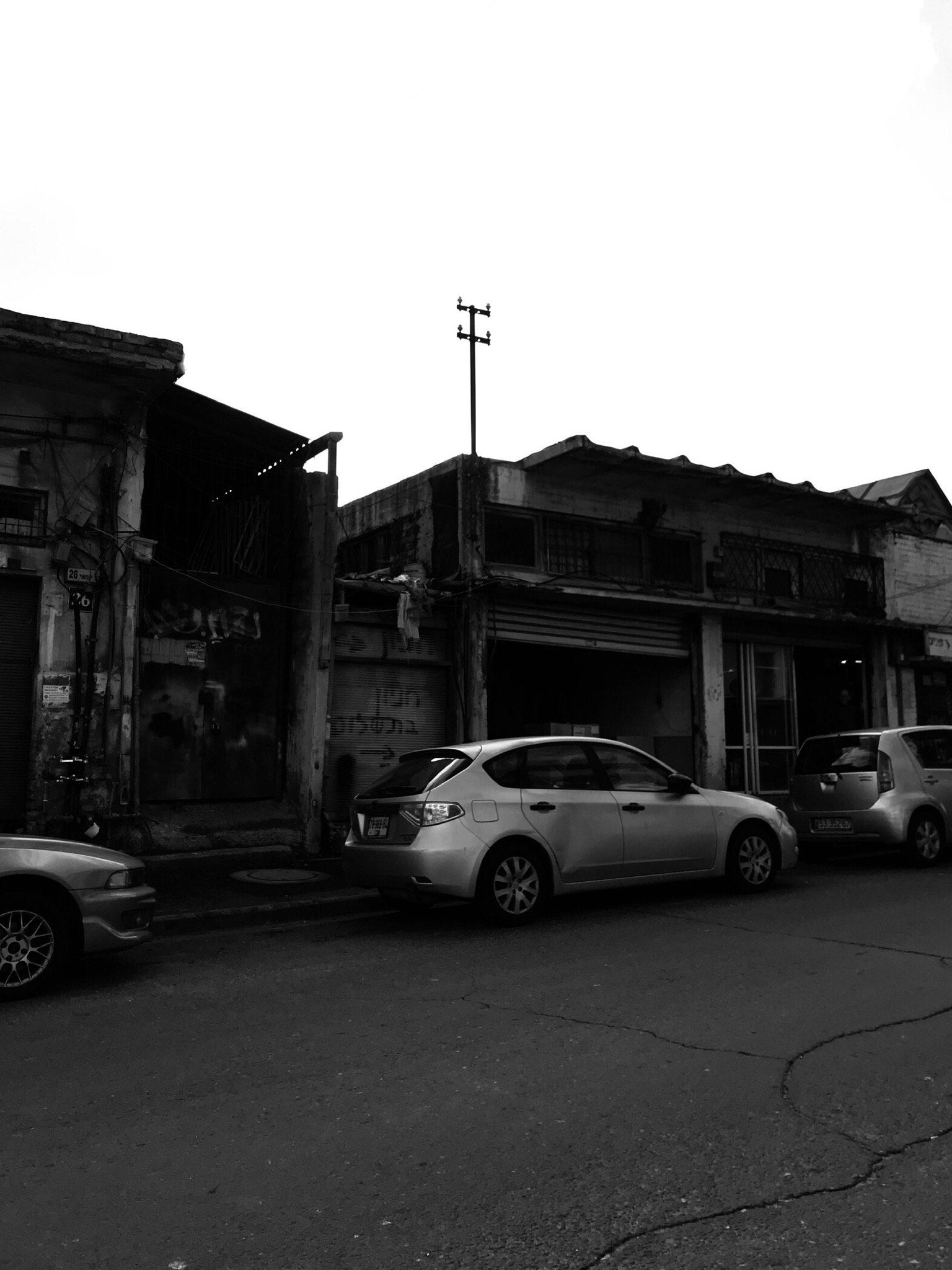
Garages in the neighbourhood (2020)

The neighbourhood was founded by Meir Getzl Shapiro, a Fourth Aliyah immigrant and an American Jewish businessman, who immigrated to Israel in 1922 and bought plots along the seashore.

=== Adjacent neighbourhoods ===
In the late 1920s, a neighbourhood named Oved A was established north of Shapira. In 1933, Shapir and Klein purchased the Habbab Orchard near the neighbourhood, dividing it into 60 plots that became the Shapir-Klein neighbourhood. In the early 1930s, Givat Moshe neighbourhood (named after Moshe Carasso) was added. These four neighbourhoods collaborated on various matters, including education. In May 1936, Givat Moshe was described as follows: "It is inhabited mostly by Bukharan and Persian immigrants. It also has crowded, not particularly high-quality shacks, but at least it is a Jewish neighbourhood." In 1940, Givat Na'ar was established north of Salamah Road.

=== Post-1948 ===
When Kiryat Shalom was built on Abu Kabir lands, seven neighbourhoods were established—three south of Kibbutz Galuyot Road and three to its north, now considered part of Shapira:

- Pardes Katan (Kiryat Shalom B) – in the east, near Heil HaShiryon Road.
- The Poalei Agudat Yisrael and HaPoel HaMizrachi housing projects – west of Pardes Katan, north and south of the Bar Yochai School, now home to the Shapira Community Center.
- Pardes Gadol – west of HaPoel HaMizrachi projects, south of Hakhamim Yisrael Boulevard.

In July 1950, the cornerstone was laid for the HaPoel HaMizrachi neighbourhood. By March 1951, 12 buildings of the HaPoel HaMizrachi housing project were under construction. By mid-1952, 160 apartments had been completed. In early 1954, residents moved into 28 apartments in the Poalei Agudat Yisrael housing project. The HaPoel HaMizrachi buildings differed from others in Kiryat Shalom as they were built on a hill, featuring front balconies and red roofs.

The Pardes Katan and Pardes Gadol neighbourhoods were originally part of the veteran settlement project of the Histadrut in Kiryat Shalom. However, due to their geographical isolation, they were given a separate committee, making them independent neighbourhoods. In 1961, Assif and Bar Yochai streets were paved.

=== From the 1990s onward ===
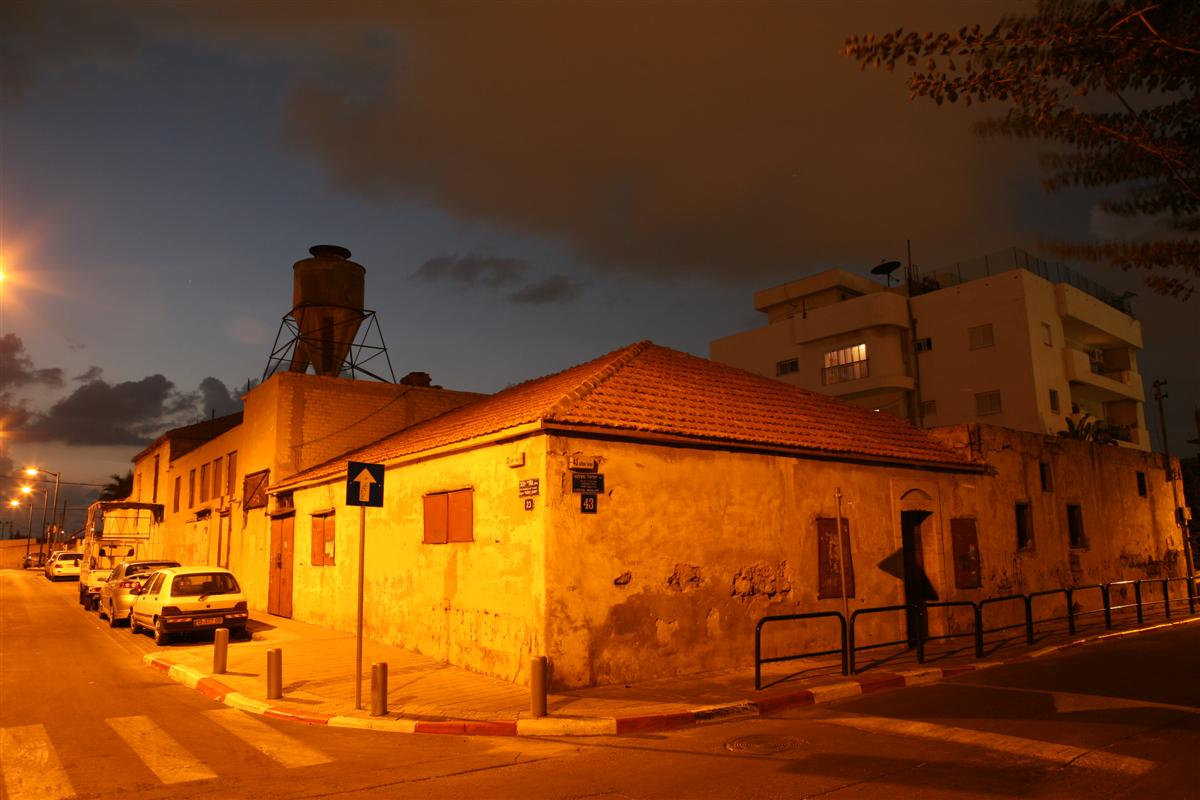
The corner of Misalant St and Turey Zahav St

In the 1990s, Tel Aviv’s New Central Bus Station was completed in the Neve Sha'anan neighbourhood, on Shapira’s northern border. Since then, the neighbourhood has undergone significant demographic and social changes. Many migrant workers, refugees, and foreign laborers moved in, altering its social fabric. The new population coexisted with long-time residents, creating a diverse and multicultural environment, but also generating tensions that led many veteran residents to leave.

In 2006, the Tel Aviv Municipality submitted a master plan for neighbourhood rehabilitation, led by Professor Eliahu Stern, but the plan remained incomplete, leaving the neighbourhood with unresolved issues.

In the second decade of the 2000s, the neighbourhood began attracting a younger population, including young families and students, due to its proximity to the heart of Tel Aviv, its communal character, the availability of small apartments, and affordable prices. Today, the neighbourhood includes a diverse mix of long-established and newer groups - an older traditional-religious population, a "second generation," new secular and religious families, students, migrant workers, and stateless individuals.
