= Shlomi Dolev =

- שלומי דולב
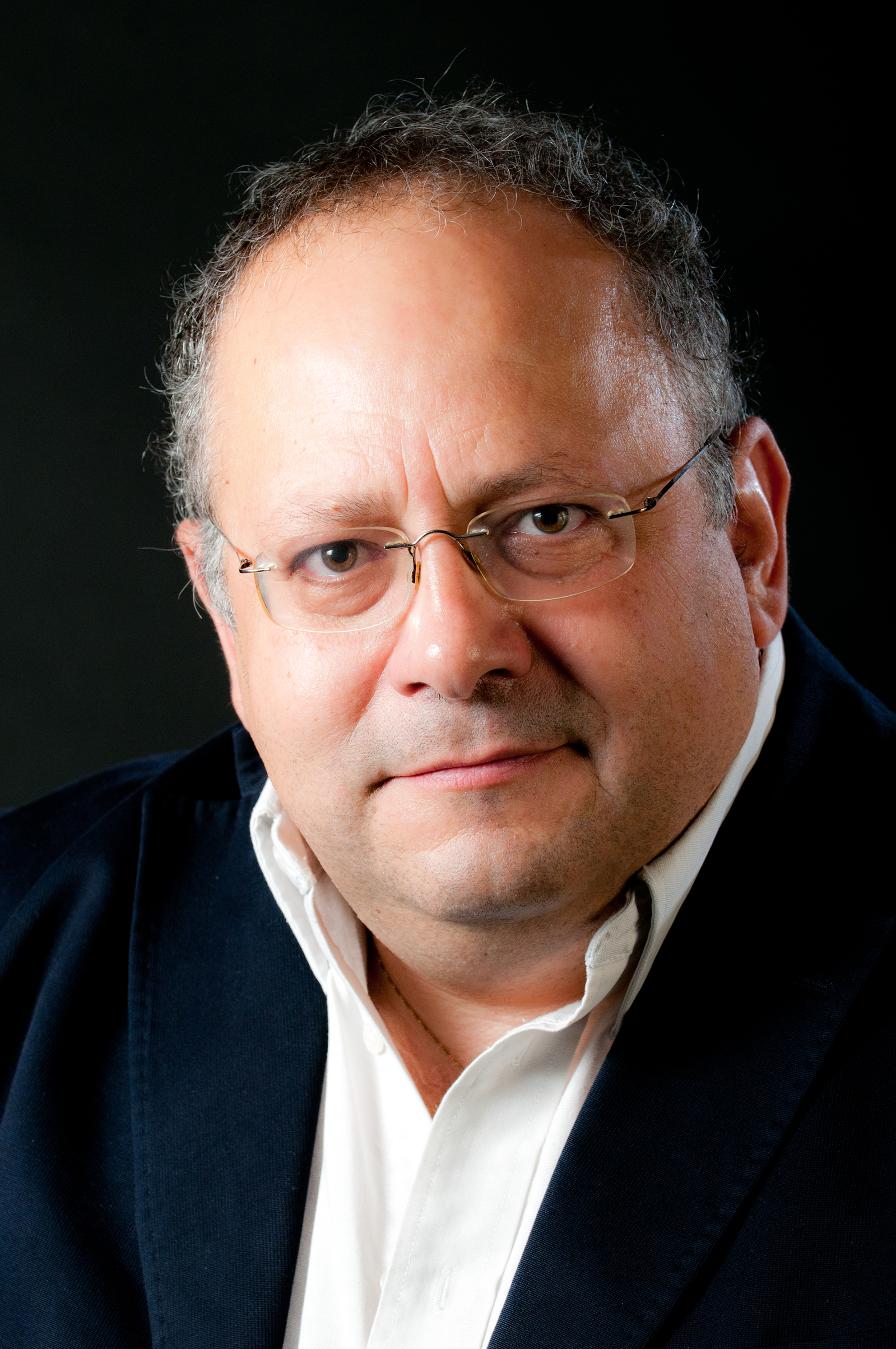
- Born: 1958 (age 67–68); Israel
- Scientific career
- Fields: Computer Science
- Workplaces: Ben-Gurion University of the Negev
- Academic advisors: Shlomo Moran, Amos Israeli
- Website: https://www.cs.bgu.ac.il/~dolev/

Shlomi Dolev (Hebrew: שלומי דולב; born December 5, 1958) is a Rita Altura Trust Chair Professor in Computer Science at Ben-Gurion University of the Negev (BGU) and the head of the BGU Negev Hi-Tech Faculty Startup Accelerator.

== Biography ==
Shlomi Dolev received B.Sc. in Civil Engineering in 1984, B.A. in Computer Science in 1985, and his M.Sc. and D.Sc. in computer science in 1990 and 1992 respectively from the Technion Israel Institute of Technology. From 1992 to 1995, he was at Texas A&M University as a visiting research specialist.

== Academic career ==
In 1995 Dolev joined the Department of Mathematics and Computer Science at BGU. He was the founder and first department head of the Computer Science Department, established in 2000. After 15 years, the department was ranked among the first 150 best departments in the world.

He is the author of Self-Stabilization published by MIT Press in 2000. From 2011 to 2014, Dolev served as Dean of the Natural Sciences Faculty. From 2010 he has served for six years, as the Head of the Inter University Computation Center of Israel.

He is a co-founder, board member and CSO of Secret Double Octopus. He is also a co-founder of Secret Sky (SecretSkyDB) Ltd. In 2015 Dolev was appointed head of the steering committee on computer science studies of the Israeli Ministry of Education.

Dolev together with Yuval Elovici and Ehud Gudes established the Telekom Innovation Laboratories at Ben-Gurion University. Dolev was instrumental in establishing the IBM Cyber Security Center of Excellence (CCoE) in Collaboration with Ben-Gurion University of the Negev, and JVP Cyber Labs. Several agencies and companies support his research including ISF, NSF, IBM (faculty awards), Verisign, EMC, Intel, Orange France, Deutsche Telekom, US Airforce and the European Union in the sum of several millions of dollars.

Dolev was a visiting professor at MIT, Paris 11, Paris 6 and DIMACS. He served in more than a hundred program committees, chairing two leading conferences in distributed computing, DISC 2006, and PODC 2014. Recently Prof. Dolev established and chaired the International Symposium on Cyber Security Cryptography and Machine Learning.

Dolev serves as an Associate Editor of the IEEE Transactions on Computers and PeerJ.

Dolev became a fellow of the European Alliance for Innovation in 2019, (EAI), and in 2020 became IEEE fellow.

== Research work ==
Dolev turned a workshop on self-stabilization (Austin, 1989) into a series of events on the subject.

Dolev's MA thesis, under the supervision of Shlomo Moran and Amos Israeli resulted in the most cited paper on self-stabilization, following the pioneering paper of Dijkstra introducing the concept of fair composition of self-stabilizing systems. Dolev's contribution to the investigation of self-stabilization spans several decades of research and publications, including research on randomized self-stabilizing algorithms, He has researched Super Stabilizing algorithms that react gracefully to dynamic changes while preserving the automatic recovery property offered by self-stabilizing systems. Dolev also introduced with co-authors, the concepts of, Silent Stabilization, Local stabilization, Practically Stabilizing, Self-stabilizing and Self-organizing, Transient Failure Detectors and yielding Labeling Schemes. He also presented the first silent self-stabilizing depth first search distributed algorithm.

Another research interest is mobile ad-hoc networks, including the use of messages random walks, GeoQuarum and virtual infrastructure, where mobile devices currently populating a geographic region implement virtual automata for the region, yielding a fixed infrastructure.

Dolev's research in cryptography and cyber security research contributions include the introduction of the xor-trees and buses, secret sharing communication and the accumulating automata and secret shared random-access machine, which evolved to patents and establishment of start-ups.

Research on optical computing and complexity complements Dolev's cryptographic research, searching for the use of computation gaps, and provable hard on average instances. Dolev initiated a series of four optical supercomputing workshops and several journal special issues (e.g., Optical High-Performance Computing—JOSA A and Applied Optics and Optical SuperComputing). Published several papers including a commentary in the Nature photonics journal, a nature communication contribution on reversible computing and a patent.

Dolev has also contributed to research in Complex Networks, Hash Function Data Structures, Brain Science, Real-time Computation, Compression, Game Theory, Erasure Correcting, Transactional Memory, Error Correcting Computations, Verification, Machine Learning, Nanotechnology and Cache replacement policy.
