= Strongtalk =

Smalltalk environment

- Paradigm: object-oriented
- Family: Smalltalk
- Designed by: Gilad Bracha, David Griswold
- Developers: Animorphic Systems, Sun Microsystems
- First appeared: 1 July 2002; 23 years ago
- Stable release: 2.0 / 9 August 2006; 19 years ago
- Typing discipline: dynamic, optional static (strong)
- Scope: Lexical (static)
- Implementation language: Smalltalk
- Platform: IA-32
- OS: cross-platform
- License: BSD revised
- Website: www.strongtalk.org

Influenced by
- Smalltalk, Self

Influenced
- Java HotSpot

In computing, Strongtalk is a Smalltalk environment with optional static typing support. Strongtalk can make some compile time checks, and offer stronger type safety guarantees; this is the source of its name. It is non-commercial, though it was originally a commercial project developed by a small startup company named LongView Technologies (trading as Animorphic Systems).

== History ==
David Griswold wanted to use Smalltalk more extensively, but then-extant implementations were insufficient for his needs. He wanted to improve the performance, add type-checking, and use native graphical user interface (GUI) widgets. His efforts resulted in the 1993 paper he co-authored with Gilad Bracha. This version was based on adding type-checking to the ParcPlace Systems implementation of Smalltalk. However, an implementation begun from scratch could gain a better typing system.

He became interested in the improvements that the team for the language Self had achieved, and envisioned the same methods used to improve Smalltalk. Urs Hölzle, who worked on the powerful Self compiler, spoke with Griswold about implementing the same type feedback in a Smalltalk compiler. Griswold, Hölzle, Lars Bak, and others formed a small company (LongView Technologies, doing business as Animorphic Systems) to re-implement Strongtalk. Work began in 1994 and they completed an implementation in 1996. The firm was bought by Sun Microsystems in 1997, and the team got focused on Java, releasing the HotSpot virtual machine, and work on Strongtalk stalled.

Sun released the 1997 re-implementation of Strongtalk as open-source software under a revised BSD license, including the Strongtalk system image in 2002, and the virtual machine in 2006. Strongtalk is touted as the fastest implementation of Smalltalk. Strongtalk is available for Windows XP (other ports are in the works) and includes a basic development environment.

== See also ==
- JavaScript
- HotSpot (Java virtual machine)
