= Lars Bak (computer programmer) =

Danish computer programmer

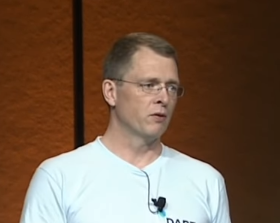
- Computer programmer Lars Bak
- Born: 1965; 61 years ago
- Occupation: Computer programmer
- Years active: 1988–present
- Known for: JavaScript expert, Virtual machine innovator
- Notable work: Dart
- Awards: Senior Dahl–Nygaard Prize

Lars Bak (born 1965) is a Danish computer programmer. He is known as a JavaScript expert and for his work on virtual machines. He formerly worked for Google, having contributed to the Chrome web browser as the lead developer of the V8 JavaScript engine.

== Professional life ==
Bak studied at Aarhus University in Denmark, receiving an MS degree in computer science in 1988 after which he became active in designing and implementing object-oriented virtual machines. He has been awarded the 2018 Senior Dahl–Nygaard Prize.

=== Virtual machines ===
After participating in the design and implementation of the BETA Mjølner System, in 1991 he joined the research group for the programming language Self at Sun Microsystems Laboratories in Palo Alto, California. During his time there, he developed a programming environment for Self, and added several enhancements to the virtual machine.

In 1994, he joined LongView Technologies LLC, where he designed and implemented high performance virtual machines for both Smalltalk and Java. After Sun Microsystems acquired LongView in 1997, Bak became engineering manager and technical lead in the HotSpot team at Sun's Java Software Division where he developed a high-performance Java virtual machine.

In 2002, after returning to Aarhus, Denmark, Bak founded OOVM, a company which developed software for mobile phones. In 2004, he sold it to a Swiss company, Esmertec.

In 2006, Bak joined Google to work on the Chrome browser. He did not return to the United States, preferring to work in Denmark where his daughters were also receiving their education. With a team of 12 engineers, Bak coordinated the development of the V8 JavaScript interpreter for Chrome, named after the V8 engine.

Bak co-developed the Dart programming language presented at the 2011 Goto conference in Aarhus, Denmark.

In 2017, Bak left Google and soon afterward co-founded a startup with Kasper Lund called Toit, which is building a new programming language called Toit and a platform for Internet of things systems.

== Patents ==
Bak holds 18 U.S. Patents for software, in the field of virtual machine programming. In 2010, after Oracle bought Sun and with Lars Bak working for Google, Oracle sued Google for infringing on several software patents and amongst them was the "Interpreting Functions Utilizing a Hybrid of Virtual and Native Machine Instructions" patent filed by Lars Bak et al.
