= Michael W. Sonnenfeldt =

American entrepreneur

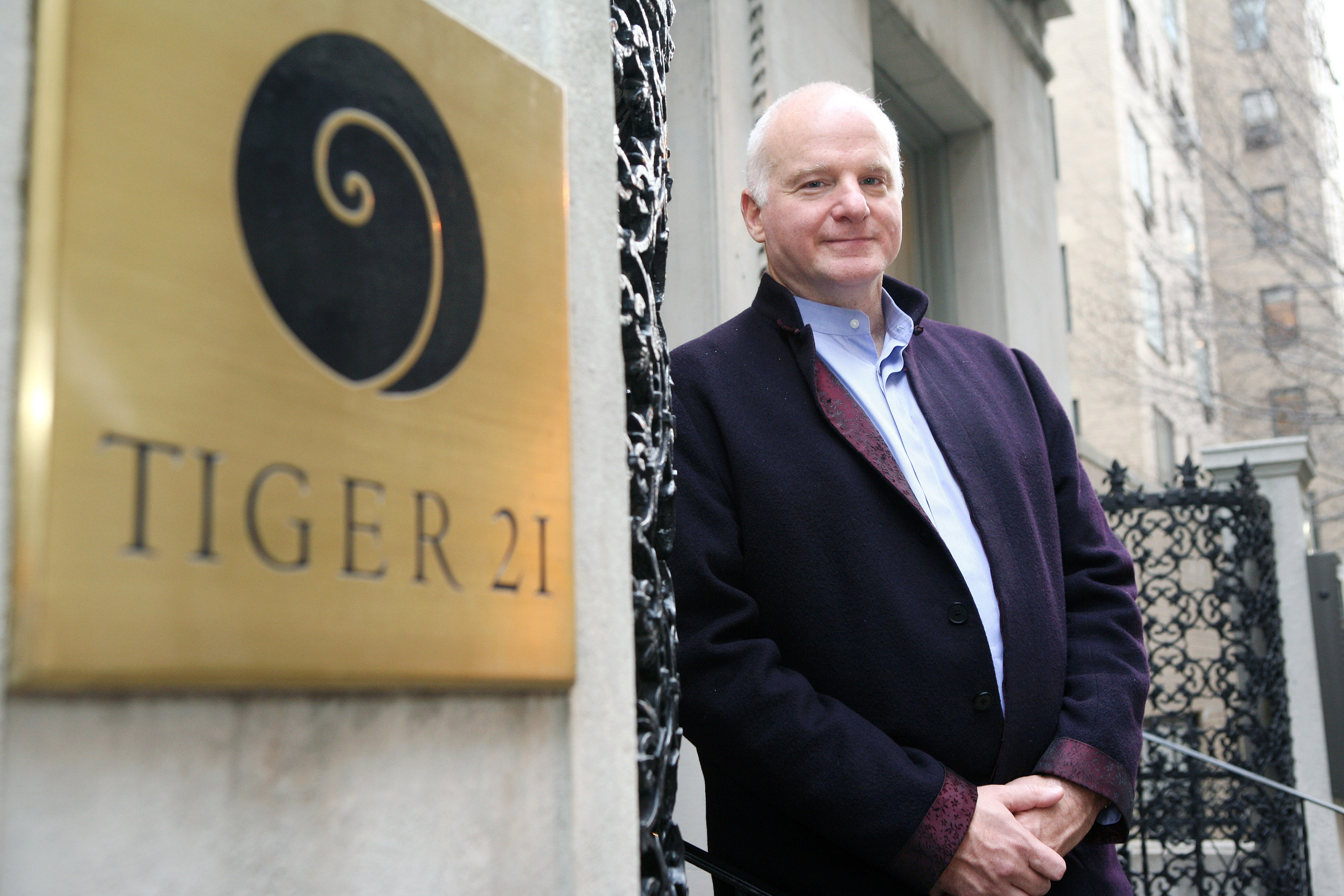
- Sonnenfeldt outside the TIGER 21 office
- Born: October 7, 1955 (age 70)
- Education: Massachusetts Institute of Technology; Ben Gurion University of the Negev
- Occupations: Entrepreneur and Philanthropist; Chairman, MUUS & Company; Chairman, MUUS Climate Partners; Co-Chair, Climate Pathways Project, Sloan School (MIT); Board Member, Center for New American Security (CNAS) Founder and Chairman of TIGER 21; President, Goldman-Sonnenfeldt Foundation

Michael W. Sonnenfeldt (born October 7, 1955) is an American entrepreneur, philanthropist, and political activist. Currently, he is the founder and chairman of TIGER 21, chairman of MUUS & Company and MUUS Climate Partners, Co-Chairman, Climate Pathways Project at the Sloan School, MIT, Board member Center for New American Security (CNAS), President, Goldman-Sonnenfeldt Foundation and author of “Think Bigger and 39 Other Lessons from Successful Entrepreneurs" published by Bloomberg/Wiley in 2017.

== Education ==
Michael Sonenfeldt attended the Massachusetts Institute of Technology (MIT) from 1974 to 1978, where he received Bachelor's and master's degrees in management. He is a member of Phi Beta Kappa society.

== Awards ==
Sonnenfeldt was awarded a degree of Doctor Philosophiae Honoris Causa from the Ben Gurion University of the Negev in 1995.

== Career ==
=== Early career ===
After graduating from MIT, Sonnenfeldt began his career as an associate at Goldman Sachs, from 1978 to 1979, in the Merger & Acquisitions Department and then transitioned to the Goldman Sachs Realty Corp.

In 1974, as a teenager working at the Harborside Terminal warehouse, Sonnenfeldt conceived, and then 7 years later with his new partner, David Fromer, acquired the building complex and initiated the then-largest commercial renovation in the country. They transformed the 2.4 million square foot facility in Jersey City, New Jersey into The Harborside Financial Center. They spearheaded a team of over 100 professionals working on the project.

Sonnenfeldt and his partner sold The Harborside Financial Center in 1986 for over $120 million to a major US pension fund, in what is considered to be one of the most successful real estate deals in the history of the New York metropolitan area. The Harborside Financial Center continues to operate as one of the top-performing assets in the New Jersey marketplace. At the time, the complex was believed to be the most valuable single commercial real estate asset in the state of New Jersey.

After the sale, Sonnenfeldt founded Real Estate Resources Corp, which created online databases of Real Estate information prior to the widespread use of the internet. The business was closed in 1990. In 1991, he founded Emmes & Company, a private real estate investment group based in New York City, to invest in the portfolios of distressed real estate being sold by the Federal Government, previously owned by banks the Federal Government had taken over in the savings and loan crises, peaking at that time. When Sonnenfeldt sold his interest in the business in 1998, Emmes had grown to own and control more than 200 properties from New York to Florida, consisting of 20+ million square feet of real estate valued at over $1B.

=== Current businesses ===
In June 1998, after selling his interest in Emmes & Company, Sonnenfeldt founded MUUS & Company, a private investment company. Sonnenfeldt directs the company's portfolio of financial, real estate and private equity investments.

In 1999, Sonnenfeldt founded TIGER 21 (The Investment Group for Enhanced Results in the 21st Century), a network of peer-to-peer learning groups for high-net-worth investors, after recognizing that the skills that made him a successful entrepreneur did not necessarily translate into successfully managing his own portfolio of investments. Sonnenfeldt continues to chair the company and is regularly used by news outlets as a resource to discuss investing and high-net-worth investor activity. TIGER 21's membership exceeded 1,000 Members as of January, 2022 and the combined net worth of those Members was approx $120 Billion.

In 2016, MUUS & Company began to focus its most active investing in climate related themes, adding Ben Wolkon as its first Manager of Sustainable Investments, leading to the development of a portfolio of 25 direct investments in companies focusing on various approaches to address the threat of climate change. In 2022 MUUS Climate Partners was established and its first fund for outside investors, MUUS Convergence Fund II, launched June 10, 2022.

== Philanthropy ==
Sonnenfeldt is an active philanthropist and has been involved for over 40 years at senior levels in numerous non-profit organizations. He focuses on national security, Middle East peace, international peacekeeping, the US/UN relationship, the removal of land mines and communal development. In recent years the environment and the potentially devastating effects of climate change have been an increasing focus of his philanthropic activities. In May 2022 the Goldman Sonnenfeldt School for Sustainability and Climate Change was named at Ben Gurion University in Israel.

=== Current ===
==== 1980’s ====
National president of American Associates Ben Gurion University (AABGU) from 1989 to 1991 and a national board member from 1991 to 2013. During that period he also served as a Vice Chairman for the university, serving for much of that time with Shimon Peres, as a fellow Vice Chair. Sonnenfeldt is currently a member of the board of governors of Ben-Gurion University of the Negev (BGU).

==== 1990’s ====
Sonnenfeldt has been a supporter of the Arnold P. Gold Foundation, an organization that works with healthcare professionals, since 1993 and became a trustee in February 2002, a position he held for approximately a decade. During that period, he served on various committees, including the Development, Investment and Nominating committees. The foundation is a non-profit organization dedicated to improving the quality of healthcare.

From 1997 to 2009, Michael Sonnenfeldt was a member of the board of directors of Synergos, a global nonprofit organization that tackles poverty and inequality by promoting and supporting collaborations among business, government, civil society, and marginalized communities. He was also a founding member of the Synergos Global Philanthropists Circle and a member since 2001.

In 1998, Sonnenfeldt founded the Humpty Dumpty Institute to strengthen the work he had been engaged in during the previous decade related to peacekeeping around the world. Sonnenfeldt was co-chair from 1998 to 2006. The organization focused on making UN peacekeeping more effective and bridging the gap between the UN and US Congress. The group also works to clear landmines and unexploded ordnance (UXO) around the world.

Sonnenfeldt was a board member and former chairman of the Resources Committee of Business Executives for National Security (BENS) from 1987 to 2000, during which time he was a member of the executive committee of the Board. Sonnenfeldt traveled extensively on behalf of BENS and worked directly with members of Congress to help shape policies supported by the organization.

==== 2000’s ====
In 2000, Sonnenfeldt and his wife launched the Goldman-Sonnenfeldt Foundation, through which he and his wife engage in philanthropic activities primarily focused on the environment, international security and peace, education and local communal activities. Sonnenfeldt serves as president of the foundation.

Since 2002 Sonnenfeldt has been a member of the international board of trustees of the Institute for National Security Studies in Israel.

==== 2010’s ====
From 2011 to 2020, Sonnenfeldt served as member of the board of trustees and, for an interim period, chair of the investment committee of Earthjustice, the nation's largest public interest legal firm with over 100 lawyers dedicated to protecting the environment. In addition he has served on the Development & Marketing Committee since 2011 and is currently on the International Review Task Force.

Sonnenfeldt also served as a member of the board and the chairman of the development committee of Securing America's Future Energy (“SAFE”), a non-partisan, non-profit organization committed to reducing America's dependence on oil in order to strengthen the country's national security and economy.

Sonnenfeldt was also the chairman of SOL, Inc. (formerly Solar Outdoor Lighting, Inc), North America's then largest and oldest dedicated manufacturer of commercial and industrial grade solar-powered outdoor lighting systems. SOL's systems were used to illuminate roadways, parking lots, jogging trails, billboards and transit shelters. From 2013 to 2019, Sonnenfeldt served as Chairman of Carmanah Technologies (LTD), a publicly traded company in Canada (CMH) that manufactures solar LED lights and solar power systems. Sonnenfeldt was the company's largest shareholder and during Sonnenfeldt's tenure the company grew in market capitalization from under $10 million to over $100 million and the stock grew in value from under $1 to $7.50.

==== 2020’s ====
In May 2022, The Ben-Gurion University announced they had received a $20 million donation from Michael Sonnenfeldt and Katja Goldman to aid in addressing climate change. The gift established the Goldman Sonnenfeldt School of Sustainability and Climate Change at Ben-Gurion University of the Negev (BGU) which is the first of its kind in Israel. The donation aids in enabling BGU to develop its research program across multiple disciplines, including agriculture, marine biology, and alternative energy across more than 150 research labs.

=== Non-active positions ===
Sonnenfeldt served on the board of the Marlene Meyerson JCC Manhattan from 1995 to 2009, served on the security committee during 2005 and was the former co-chair of the organization's Capital Campaign from 1995 to 2005. This 14-year campaign, spearheaded by Sonnenfeldt and his wife as well as one other couple, provided the initial funds to build the new $100 million home for the JCC on Manhattan's Upper West Side.

Sonnenfeldt was the former vice chairman and chairman of the executive committee of the United Nations Association of the United States of America (UNA-USA), which was then a preeminent non-governmental group which sought to strengthen the United Nations, and the United States’ role in it, through a combination of national public outreach, policy research and international dialogue. He conceived and led the Global Peacekeeping Inspection Team for nearly a decade, during which time his team visited and reported on UN Peacekeeping installations in over 25 sites around the globe. During Sonnenfeldt's tenure in which he served as Vice Chair and chairman of the executive committee, the UNA was the nation's largest foreign policy organization, with over 30,000 members and 130 chapters nationwide.

== Political activism ==
=== Current ===
Sonnenfeldt co-founded the Israel Policy Forum (IPF) in 1993 to support the Middle East peace process and promote Israel's future as a Jewish and democratic state by advancing a diplomatic resolution to the Arab-Israeli conflict. He served as chairman from 1997 until 2001.

Sonnenfeldt has served on the board of trustees of the Washington Institute for Near East Policy, a leading think tank focused exclusively on the Middle East, since 1998.

Sonnenfeldt was an early supporter of No Labels which was created with the intention of consensus building between parties and finding solutions to the nation's pressing problems.

In 2004, Sonnenfeldt was a New York co-chair of Senator Joe Lieberman's for Presidential Campaign.
