= Limor Shmerling Magazanik =

Israel expert in Tech policy and cybersecurity

- לימור שמרלינג מגזניק
- Education: L.L.B., Tel Aviv University; L.L.M. in public law, Tel Aviv University; M.A. in literature with a focus on women and gender studies, Tel Aviv University
- Occupations: Tech Policy Thought Leader and Director
- Employer(s): OECD Organisation for Economic Co-operation and Development
- Awards: Forbes Top 50 Women in Tech 2018

Limor Shmerling Magazanik (Hebrew: לימור שמרלינג מגזניק) is an Israeli lawyer and government advisor on data policy, governance and ethics.

== Education ==
Shmerling Magazanik has a Master of Law in public law, a Master of Arts degree in literature with a special focus on women and gender studies, and a Bachelor of Law from Tel Aviv University.

== Career ==
Shmerling Magazanik worked with the Israel Privacy Protection Authority (PPA) at the Ministry of Justice, as Director of Strategic Alliances and as Director of Enforcement and Regulation, focusing on policy initiatives and promoted compliance with data protection, privacy, cybersecurity and digital identity regulation.

Magazanik appeared on the World's Top 50 Women in Tech 2018 on Forbes List.

Magazanik has been the managing director of the Israel Tech Policy Institute (ITPI) and a Senior Fellow at the Future of Privacy Forum.

She is adjunct lecturer at the Hebrew University of Jerusalem.
