= Limor Blockman =

Israeli sexologist

Limor Blockman לימור בלוקמן
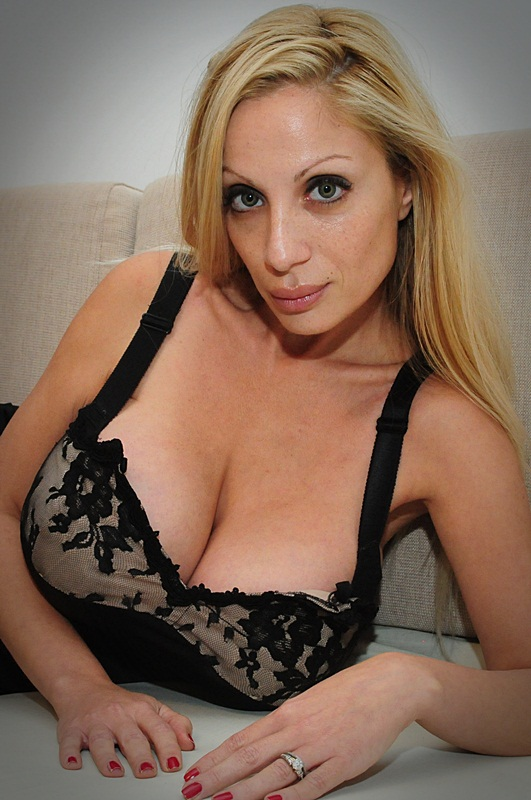
- Dr. Limor Blockman, at home in 2012
- Born: February 10, 1977 (age 49); Haifa, Israel
- Other names: Limor Blockman-Michelman, Limor Blockmanmichelman, Limor Michelman, Limor Michelman
- Occupations: Sexologist, glamour photography model, television personality
- Modeling information
- Height: 5 ft 3 in (1.60 m)
- Hair color: Blonde
- Eye color: Green
- Website: www.drlimor.com//

Limor Blockman (Hebrew: לימור בלוקמן; born February 10, 1977), also known as Dr. Limor, is an Israeli-American sex therapist, glamour model, and television personality.

== Education ==
Shortly after highschool graduation, Blockman joined and served the Israel Defense Forces, as part of her mandatory regular service. After leaving the Army, Blockman attended the Max Stern Academic College of Emek Yezreel where she earned a B.A. degree in Psychology and Behavioral Sciences. For her M.P.H. degree, Blockman attended the Hebrew University of Jerusalem, where she studied Community Medicine and Public Health. In 2006, Blockman earned a Ph.D. degree in Human Sexuality from the Institute for Advanced Study of Human Sexuality.

== Career ==
In 2002, Blockman established "Dr. L's Love Boutique" in Haifa, where she began her career as a sex and marriage counselor. In 2003, Blockman began hosting "Tayar Bareshet", a late night TV show on the Israeli Channel 2. Blockman is author of three bestselling books (published in Hebrew): 300 Tips for Better Sex, which earned her a platinum award for selling 40,000 copies in 2007; Gay Pride, the complete guide for the gay, bisexual, and transgender community; and Confessions, the true story of Blockman's search for love and honest relationship. Blockman appeared on many magazine covers globally and was noted as "The Sexy Sexologist" covered for her appearance at times more than her professionalism. Blockman has reached people worldwide through her presence on paper, TV, radio, video, internet, mobile applications, and professional conventions as a consultant.
