= Jiwchar Ganor =

Israeli researcher

- יבחר גנאור
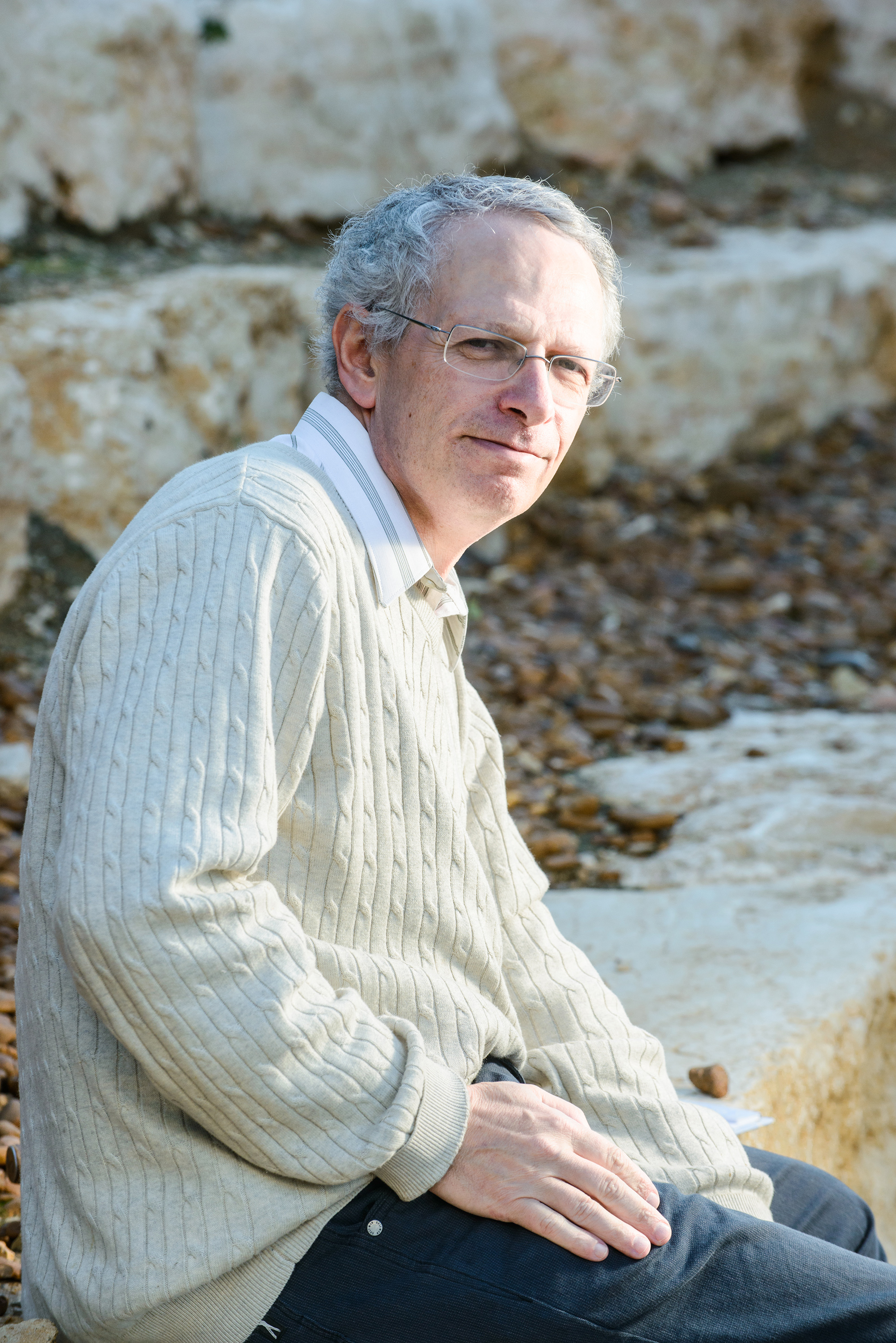
- Scientific career
- Fields: Geology, Environmental Sciences
- Institutions: Ben-Gurion University of the Negev
- Doctoral advisor: Prof. Alan Matthews and Prof. Zvi Garfunkel
- Website: in.bgu.ac.il/teva/geological/eng/ganor/Pages/default.aspx

Jiwchar Ganor (Hebrew: יבחר גנאור) is a professor in the Department of Geological and Environmental Sciences at Ben-Gurion University of the Negev, and has served as Dean of the Faculty of Natural Sciences.

== Education ==
Ganor received his B.Sc. (cum laude, 1983) in Geology and Biology and an M.Sc. in Geology (summa cum laude, 1986) from The Hebrew University of Jerusalem. The title of his M.Sc. thesis was Halite Islands in the Southern Basin of the Dead Sea. In his thesis, written under the supervision of Prof. Amitai Katz, he explored the formation of salt cones and mushroom-like structures in the southern basin of the Dead Sea. He showed that these structures were formed near depressions in the basin floor that contain warm and dense brines, which were formed by evaporation at the lake's surface. He suggested that bottom halite is dissolved in the warmer brines. Upon cooling, the extra load of halite is precipitated near the holes, forming the salt structure. Ganor earned his Ph.D. from The Hebrew University of Jerusalem (1991). The title of his Ph.D. thesis was The Influence of Fluids on Metamorphism in a Plate Collision Region (the Cycladic Massif, Greece). His research, conducted under the supervision of Prof. Alan Matthews and Prof. Zvi Garfunkel, studied metamorphic rocks on the Cycladic islands of Sifnos and Tinos (Greece). He showed that oxygen isotope compositional heterogeneities among high P/T rocks and retrograde overprinting assemblages reflect an original tectonostratigraphic signature and not the effects of fluid infiltration, as was previously thought. Based on the isotopic data, he concluded that outcrop- and layer-scale variations in the degree of retrograde metamorphic transformation were controlled by selective infiltration of small amounts of fluids. Ganor spent three years (1991–1994) as a postdoctoral associate in the group of Antonio C. Lasaga at Yale University's Department of Geology and Geophysics, where he studied the kinetics of dissolution of clay minerals.

== Career ==
Ganor joined BGU in 1994 as a lecturer in the Department of Geology and Mineralogy, which was later renamed the Department of Geological and Environmental Sciences. Within the department, he founded the Water-Rock Interaction Laboratory, where he studies, together with his students, the kinetics of dissolution and precipitation of minerals. Ganor was promoted to the rank of Associate Professor in 2006 and Full Professor in 2011. Between 2009 and 2013 he served as Chair of the Department of Geological and Environmental Sciences. In 2014 he was elected Dean of the Faculty of Natural Sciences. Ganor has also served as president of the Israel Geological Society (2007).

== Research and students ==
Ganor has published numerous scientific papers and has supervised Ph.D. and master's students. In order to understand the mechanisms that control water-rock interactions, his group conducted laboratory experiments studying sorption, dissolution and precipitation, as well as theoretical modeling. Among other things, he has conducted studies on weathering, precipitation and dissolution of various minerals and research on the coupling between dissolution of primary minerals and precipitation of secondary minerals. The studies are conducted both under conditions of natural weathering and under environmental conditions of geological sequestration of carbon dioxide. Ganor and his group developed a novel method to measure slow rates of dissolution and precipitation of silicates using stable isotopes of silicon. This innovative method was used to resolve the longstanding gap between laboratory and field rates of feldspar weathering. Although his research is of a basic nature, some of his studies have had important practical implications. These include studies on such topics as the kinetics of decomposition of two organic molecules that contaminate the ground water under the Industrial Zone of Neot Hovav, the salinity of the Nubian Sandstone groundwater in the Negev desert, the sources of radioactive isotopes of radium in Middle East aquifers that containing fresh water, precipitation of gypsum and aragonite in the Dead Sea. In his research, Ganor has collaborated with many other researchers and students. A partial list may be found on his research web page.

== Poetry ==
Poems written by Jiwchar Ganor have appeared in several literary journals. His first book of poetry, One Word Sometimes Suffices, was published with Pardes Publishing in 2017. Ganor's poem, "VEYADO SHLUCHA," was set to music by Israeli composer Amit Poznansky.
