= Leslie Lobel =

American-born Israeli virologist and physician

Leslie Lobel (Hebrew: לסלי לובל; deceased 2018) was an American-born Israeli virologist and physician at Ben-Gurion University in Israel, where he was a leading researcher attempting to develop a vaccine and cure for infectious diseases, primarily Ebola. He was Chair of their Department of Virology and Developmental Genetics, and Vice Chair of the Department of Microbiology, Immunology and Genetics.

Partnering with both the U.S. military and the Uganda Virus Research Institute, his focus since moving to Israel in 2002, had been on isolating human monoclonal antibodies as a drug which could be manufactured to give people immunity against a number of infectious diseases. With his co-investigator, Dr. Victoria Yavelsky, he had hoped to create a "passive" vaccine which would offer protection immediately after being given.

== Early years and education ==
Born in Queens, New York, Lobel received his B.A., summa cum laude, in chemistry, from Columbia College of Columbia University, followed by a Ph.D. in virology. He received an M.D. from Columbia University College of Physicians and Surgeons in 1988. He also did post-graduate work at M.I.T. in Boston. He stated that he went into virology since the field was small. Later, his interest shifted to oncology and the study of human immune response to cancer.

== Research career ==
Lobel had been working to isolate monoclonal antibodies for West Nile Fever, Hepatitis C, as well as Ebola, of which he was one of the world's few experts. “Ebola is the most lethal virus," he stated. "It can kill 90% of those afflicted. And there is no therapy to counter it. There is a vaccine thus far tested in animals, but it takes a relatively long time to build immunity.” As monoclonal antibodies are proteins that attack specific targets, including viruses, bacteria or other foreign bodies, “the antibodies will neutralize the virus, and avoid the dangerous side effects of the existing vaccine,” he said. He anticipated that they would also be useful for treating diseases like smallpox in the event of an outbreak, and would give protection immediately instead of weeks or the month required by typical vaccines.

For this research, he traveled to Uganda about four times a year, with the aid of U.S. and other foreign grants, where he studied a variety of infectious viruses. The research relied primarily on obtaining and analyzing blood samples from survivors of Ebola and other diseases. There were over 100 Ugandan survivors of Ebola that he used to contact during his visits, checking their blood antibody and immunity levels over time, trying to discover how their immune system helped them survive. He said that such personal surveys would be less possible had not Israel invested time and effort in partnering with African medical organizations over many decades and gained their trust. He noted that in some parts of Africa, neither the medical system nor foreigners are trusted: "They don’t trust white people coming from outside Africa to treat them."

For the 2014 Ebola outbreak in West Africa, Lobel blamed the fact that there had been a severe reduction of research into infectious diseases since the 1970s, leading to less surveillance or ability to properly control outbreaks after they start. He saw globalization and global warming as contributing factors, as they upset the ecological niches of bats, which he felt are the most likely viral reservoirs. The 2014 outbreak, in his opinion, represented a "perfect storm" for a disease such as Ebola, having erupted in poor countries with meager medical care and where governments have little control over their populations.

Lobel added that besides Ebola, there are other "bad" viruses out there, which the developed world prefers to ignore so long as they aren't affected. This has resulted in little research into other infectious diseases, with the Ebola outbreak becoming a "wake-up call": "Infectious diseases have not gone away," he claimed. "They continue to evolve. Viruses never sleep. It’s just that we have slept."
