= Chaim Hames =

Academic

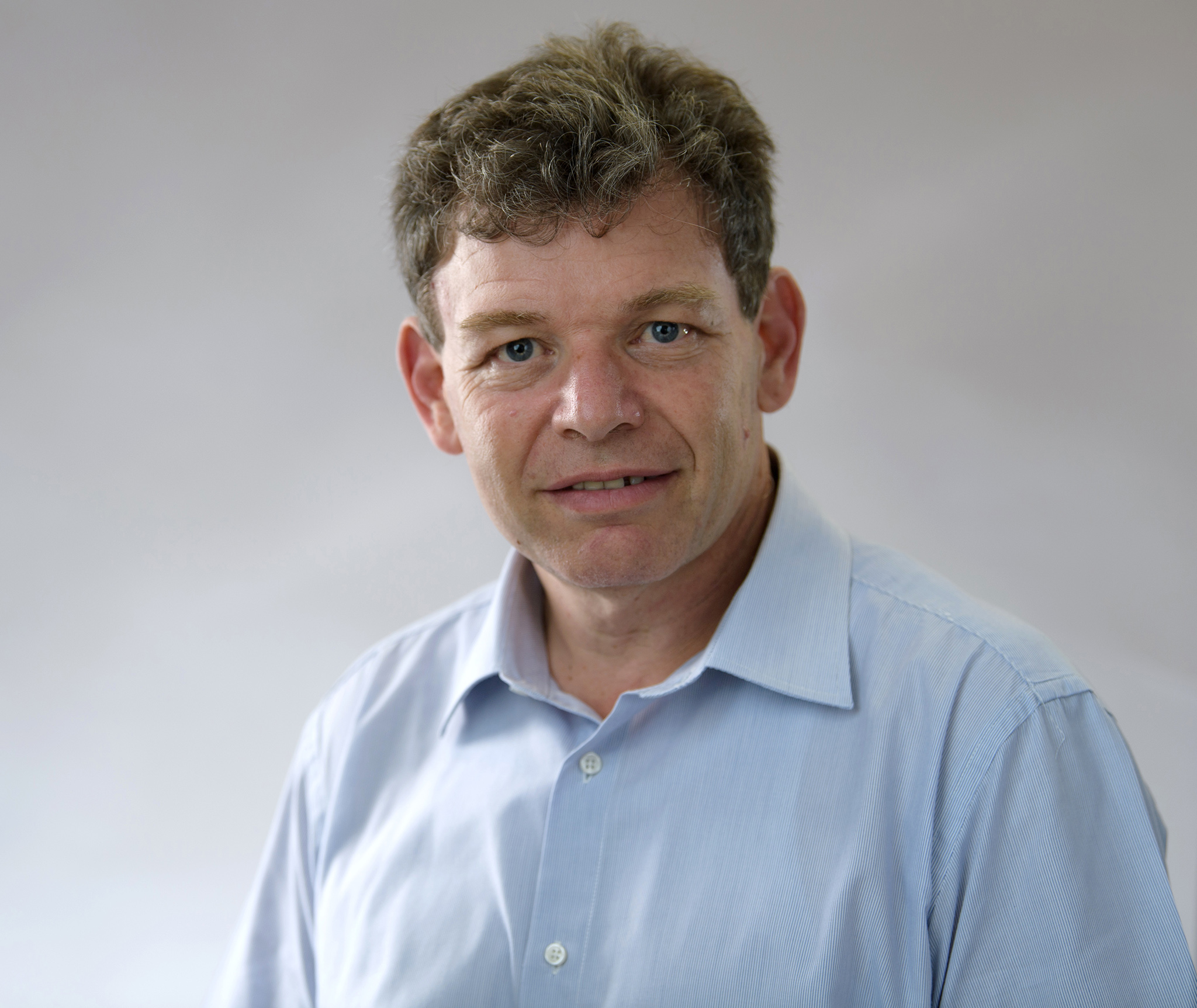
Chaim Hames

Chaim (Harvey) J. Hames (Hebrew: חיים היימס; born 8 July 1966) is a professor of history at Ben-Gurion University of the Negev (BGU), in Beer-Sheva, Israel, and the incumbent of the David Berg and Family Chair in European History. On 1 August 2018, he assumed office as Rector of BGU. He stepped down from being Rector after two terms of four years at the end of July 2026. Hames' research focuses on medieval history, with a particular interest in inter-religious encounters, particularly between Christianity, Judaism, and Islam. He also works on religious conversion, inter-religious polemics, mysticism, philosophy, apocalypticism, and magic.

== Early life and education ==
Chaim Hames was born in England in 1966 and immigrated with his parents to Israel in 1978 when he was 12. He grew up in a Religious Orthodox-Zionist household in Petah-Tikva and attended Midrashiat Noam, a Yeshiva High-School in Pardes Hanna.

Following three years of military service, Hames completed a B.A. in history at the Hebrew University of Jerusalem.

Hames received an M.Phil (Queens’ College) in 1992 and Ph.D (Sidney Sussex College) in Medieval History from the University of Cambridge in England in 1996 where his supervisor was the late Professor David Abulafia (Gonville and Caius College).

== Career ==
Hames joined the Department of History at BGU in October 1995.

In 2000, Hames spent six months as a fellow at the Center for Judaic Studies in Philadelphia. He is a Life Fellow of Clare Hall, Cambridge where he was on sabbatical in 2002-2003. In 2009, he spent a sabbatical year at the Universitat Autonoma de Barcelona where he worked with an ERC funded research group on medieval Hebrew translations of Latin texts. Together with Alexander Fidora (PI), he was also part of the ERC Consolidation Grant working on the Latin Talmud.

Hames served as Chair of the Department of History from 2011 to 2015. In 2013, he established the Center for the Study of Conversion and Inter-Religious Encounters as part of the I-CORE initiative. He was Dean of the Faculty of Humanities and Social Sciences from 2016 to 2018. He was Rector of Ben-Gurion University of the Negev from 1 August 2018 - 31 July 2026. He was elected a fellow of the Academy of Europe (Academia Europaea) in 2019.

Hames has published over 40 articles in peer-reviewed journals and collected volumes, as well as a number of books: The Art of Conversion: Christianity and Kabbalah in the Thirteenth Century (Brill 2000), a book about Ramon Llull (1232-1316), a Christian mystic, philosopher and missionary from the Balearic Islands who developed a method for converting Jews and Muslims utilizing Kabbalistic ideas; Like Angels on Jacob’s Ladder: Abraham Abulafia, the Franciscans and Joachimism (SUNY Press, 2007), which describes the encounter between Jewish mystic Abraham Abulafia and Christian followers, particularly Franciscans, of the teachings of Joachim of Fiore; and Ha-Melacha ha-Ketzara: Ramon Llull's Ars brevis in Hebrew (Brepols 2012), which presents a critical edition and translation into English of Ramon Llull’s Ars brevis which was translated into Hebrew in 15th century Italy and was considered by its Jewish readers as a book “small in quantity, but great in quality.

He was guest editor of two volumes of the Mediterranean Historical Review entitled Mediterranean Reflections: Studies in Honour of David Abulafia (2010-2011) and of Jews, Muslims and Christians in and around the Medieval Crown of Aragon: Studies in Honour of Elena Lourie (Brill 2004). Together with Alexander Fidora and Yossef Schwartz, he edited a volume entitled Latin into Hebrew: Vol. II: Texts in Contexts (Brill 2013) and was the editor of The Brighter Side of Medieval Inter-Religious Encounters which appeared as a special number of the journal Medieval Encounters (2016).

He has also written a book for general audiences in Hebrew dealing with Judaism in contemporary Israel entitled, I (do not) Believe: Judaism and Israel, Past, Present, Future (Tel Aviv: Ktav Publishing House 2011).

== Non-professional public and personal activities ==
In 2008, Hames joined Beer-Sheva Mayor Ruvik Danilovich's party and was a candidate for the City Council. He served on the town’s Education Committee, and represented the mayor on the executive board of Bet Yatziv, the Carasso Scientific Park and a member of the general assembly of the Beersheba Fund. In 2006, he founded Ohev, a non-profit organization that aimed to organize the purchase of the Hapoel Be'er Sheva soccer club by its fans (similar to the Barcelona model) before it was eventually purchased by Alona Barkat. From 2012-2017, he was head of scout troop Nitzanei Ha-Negev in Beer-Sheva. Haim took part in the 929 initiative and has also composed a number of prayers, one of which was used by ex-Knesset member, Ruth Calderon, in her famous maiden speech to the Knesset.

After stepping down as Rector of BGU, During August and the start of September 2026, Hames walked the Camino del Norte from Irun to Santiago de Compostella. Following that, he was a guest on Dr. Heather A. Warfield's podcast, The Psychology of Pilgrimage where he talked about his experience with some reflections on the concept of pilgrimage in general.
