= Ofer Zwikael =

Australian academic and author

- עופר צוויקל
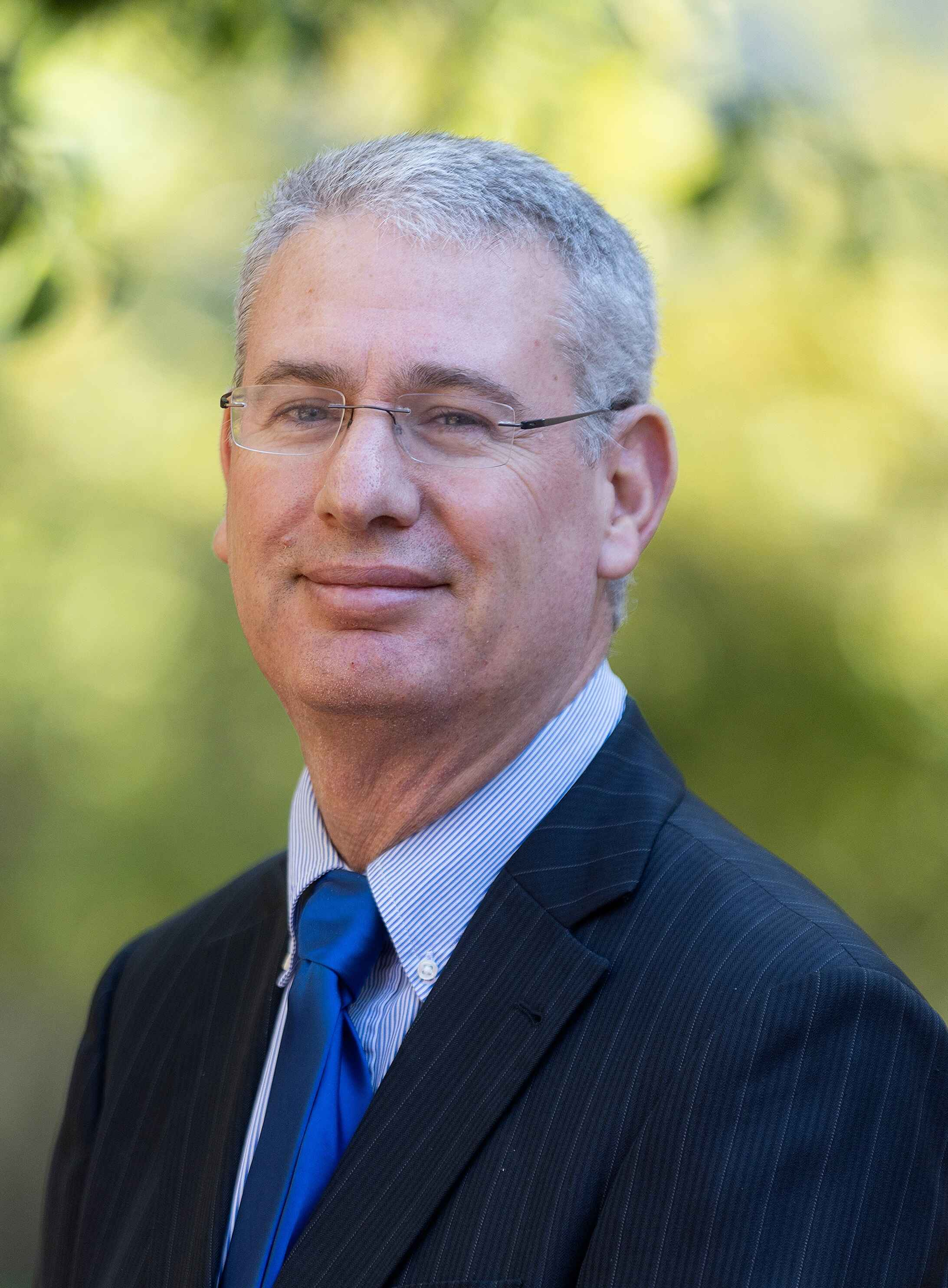
- Occupations: Management scientist; academic; author

Academic background
- Education: Ben Gurion University; Tel Aviv University

Academic work
- Institutions: Australian National University

Ofer Zwikael (Hebrew: עופר צוויקל) is an Australian management scientist, academic, and author. He is a professor in the Australian National University's Research School of Management.

Zwikael is most known for his work in the domain of project management, in particular for his contribution to the field of project benefits management, where he developed theories, models, and practices on how managers create project value that makes a positive impact on organizations and society. Among his authored works are his publications in academic journals, including International Journal of Project Management and Journal of Operations Management as well as books such as Project Management for the Creation of Organisational Value and Project Management: A Benefit Realisation Approach. Moreover, he is the recipient of 2016 International Project Management Association (IPMA) Research Award and the 2020 Project Management Institute's David I. Cleland Project Management Literature Award.

== Education ==
Zwikael earned his BSc, in Industrial Engineering from Ben Gurion University in 1993, followed by an MBA from Tel Aviv University in 1998 and a PhD in 2003 from the same institution.

== Career ==
From 2006 to 2008, Zwikael was a senior lecturer at Victoria University of Wellington's Victoria Management School. He then joined the Australian National University's Research School of Management as an associate professor, serving from 2008 to 2019 before being promoted to professor, a position he has held since then.

Zwikael served as associate dean for the ANU College of Business and Economics at Australian National University from 2014 to 2016. Additionally, he held the position of director of the Research School of Management at the same institution from 2019 to 2022.

== Books ==
In 2011, Zwikael co-authored the book Project Management for the Creation of Organisational Value, in which he analyzed the shortcomings of existing project management methods and proposed enhanced processes for greater project success. Joan Dobbie, in her review commended the author for his efforts in providing a comprehensive overview of the challenges encountered in the realm of project management, accompanied by a model for effectively addressing these concerns. In 2014, he co-authored the book Challenges and Best Practices of Managing Government Projects and Programs: Theory and Practices, analyzing why government projects in sectors such as infrastructure, information systems, and defense often fail and offering strategies for improving their management and success rates. The book was reviewed by Javed Azam, who said "The analysis and recommendations presented in the book reinforces the importance of utilizing project/program management principles and systems that would lead to successful implementation of projects and thereby, reduce and/or prevent waste of taxpayers' money in the process."

Zwikael's 2019 award-winning book Project Management: A Benefit Realisation Approach is key resource on project benefits management. The book provides a guide for the project owner (the individual held accountable for realizing the project business case) in leading the change, the project steering committee, and the project benefits management process. His 2022 book Effective Implementation of Transformation Strategies: How to Navigate the Strategy and Change Interface Successfully explored the processes and cognitions involved in implementing strategies amidst organizational change. The book conceptualized corporate strategy through four fundamental strategies, emphasizing the importance of integrating them to achieve successful strategic change and navigating various market and non-market influences. The book was reviewed by Zhou Jiang, who said "This is a must-read collection of papers from leading experts in strategy and change management, which bridges the worlds of academia and industry. The book is full of critical, cutting-edge and research-driven insights, enabling it to serve as a guide for leaders keen to formulate and implement strategies in dynamic business environments." Additionally, his work has attracted media attention, with interviews appearing in academic and practitioner magazines.

== Research ==
Zwikael has engaged in interdisciplinary management research. His early research on project management evaluated five forecasting models for project cost estimation using real project data, identified the most accurate model, and determined the point at which its forecasts became stable and accurate. His 2006 collaborative study with S Globerson analyzed the impact of specific planning processes on project success, identified Critical Success Processes (CSP), and suggested that traditional Critical Success Factors (CSF) may have been too general to effectively support project managers' decision-making. In 2009, he collaborated with W Lipke and others, proposing a method combining earned value management, earned schedule, and statistical prediction methods to improve forecasting accuracy for final project costs and durations. Furthermore, his joint 2011 study with M Ahn revealed that even moderate levels of risk management planning can significantly reduce the negative impact of risk on project success. Zwikael explored the effectiveness of formal planning in project management, comparing traditional strategic planning with newer tactical planning approaches. His study found that while strategic planning generally holds more value, tactical planning may be counterproductive in low-risk projects, thereby highlighting the importance of adapting planning approaches based on project context.

His most significant contribution to research is in the area of project benefits management. In his 2012 research, he challenged conventional project performance evaluation methods by introducing a novel framework across three distinct success dimensions, positing that this approach could enhance investment decision-making and project benefits realization. His 2015 work explored the formulation and appraisal of project target benefits, proposing a conceptual framework based on interviews with senior managers in Australia. The study also highlighted the importance of criteria such as strategic fit and measurability, as well as constructs such as formal benefit formulation processes and executive leadership, in improving organizational performance. Investigating the relationship between effective project governance, benefit management, and project success, his 2017 study proposed a model based on empirical evidence that demonstrated how effective project governance enhances project success and facilitates the achievement of strategic objectives through project benefits management. Later, together with Jack R. Meredith, he published a series of papers on the role of the project owner and their accountability for benefits realization and the delivery of the business case. First, in 2018, in their paper entitled "Who's who in the project zoo?", they defined the ten core project roles, including the key role of the project owner. Then, in 2019, his paper set the responsibilities of the project owner in benefits management throughout all project phases. In 2021, they developed models that evaluate the performance of the project leaders (project owner and project manager) and distinguished these performance evaluation models from measuring the success of a project. In 2023 he co-wrote an Editorial that summarized the research to date on project benefits management, identified enablers and inhibitors of project benefits management implementation, and proposed a framework for future research. Moreover, in 2024 he identified the 10 groups of project benefits to support their setting, management, and realization.

== Awards and honors ==
- 2008 – Outstanding Research Contribution, International Project Management Association
- 2015 – Emerald Citations of Excellence Award, Emerald
- 2016 – IPMA Research Award, International Project Management Association
- 2016 – Project Management Research Award, Australian Institute of Project Management
- 2020 – David I Cleland Project Management Literature Award, Project Management Institute

== Bibliography ==
=== Selected books ===
- Project Management for the Creation of Organisational Value (2011) ISBN 9781849965156
- Challenges and Best Practices of Managing Government Projects and Programs (2014) ISBN 9781628250657
- Project Management A Benefit Realisation Approach (2019) ISBN 9783030031732
- Effective Implementation of Transformation Strategies: How to Navigate the Strategy and Change Interface Successfully (2022) ISBN 9789811923357

=== Selected articles ===
- Zwikael, O., & Globerson, S. (2006). From critical success factors to critical success processes. International journal of production research, 44(17), 3433–3449.
- Zwikael, O., Sadeh, A. (2007). Planning effort as an effective risk management tool. Journal of Operations Management, 25(4), 755–767.
- Lipke, W., Zwikael, O., Henderson, K., & Anbari, F. (2009). Prediction of project outcome: The application of statistical methods to earned value management and earned schedule performance indexes. International journal of project management, 27(4), 400–407.
- Zwikael, O., & Ahn, M. (2011). The effectiveness of risk management: an analysis of project risk planning across industries and countries. Risk Analysis: An International Journal, 31(1), 25–37.
- Zwikael, O., & Smyrk, J. (2012). A general framework for gauging the performance of initiatives to enhance organizational value. British Journal of Management, 23, S6-S22.
- Ul Musawir, A., Serra, C. E. M., Zwikael, O., & Ali, I. (2017). Project governance, benefit management, and project success: Towards a framework for supporting organizational strategy implementation. International Journal of Project Management, 35(8), 1658–1672.
- Zwikael, O., Meredith, J. (2018). Who's who in the project zoo? The ten core project roles. International Journal of Operations & Production Management, 38(2), 474–492.
- Zwikael, O., Meredith, J., Smyrk, J. (2019). The responsibilities of the project owner in benefits realization. International Journal of Operations & Production Management, 39(4), 503–524.
- Zwikael, O., Meredith, J. (2021). Evaluating the success of a project and the performance of its leaders. IEEE Transactions on Engineering Management, 68(6), 1745–1757.
- Zwikael, O., Huemann, M. (2023). Project benefits management: Making an impact on organizations and society through projects and programs. International Journal of Project Management, 41(8), 102538.
- Zwikael, O. (2024). Benefits classification to enhance project value creation. International Journal of Project Management, 42(2), 102574.
