= Zvi HaCohen =

Israeli scientist and university official

- צבי הכהן
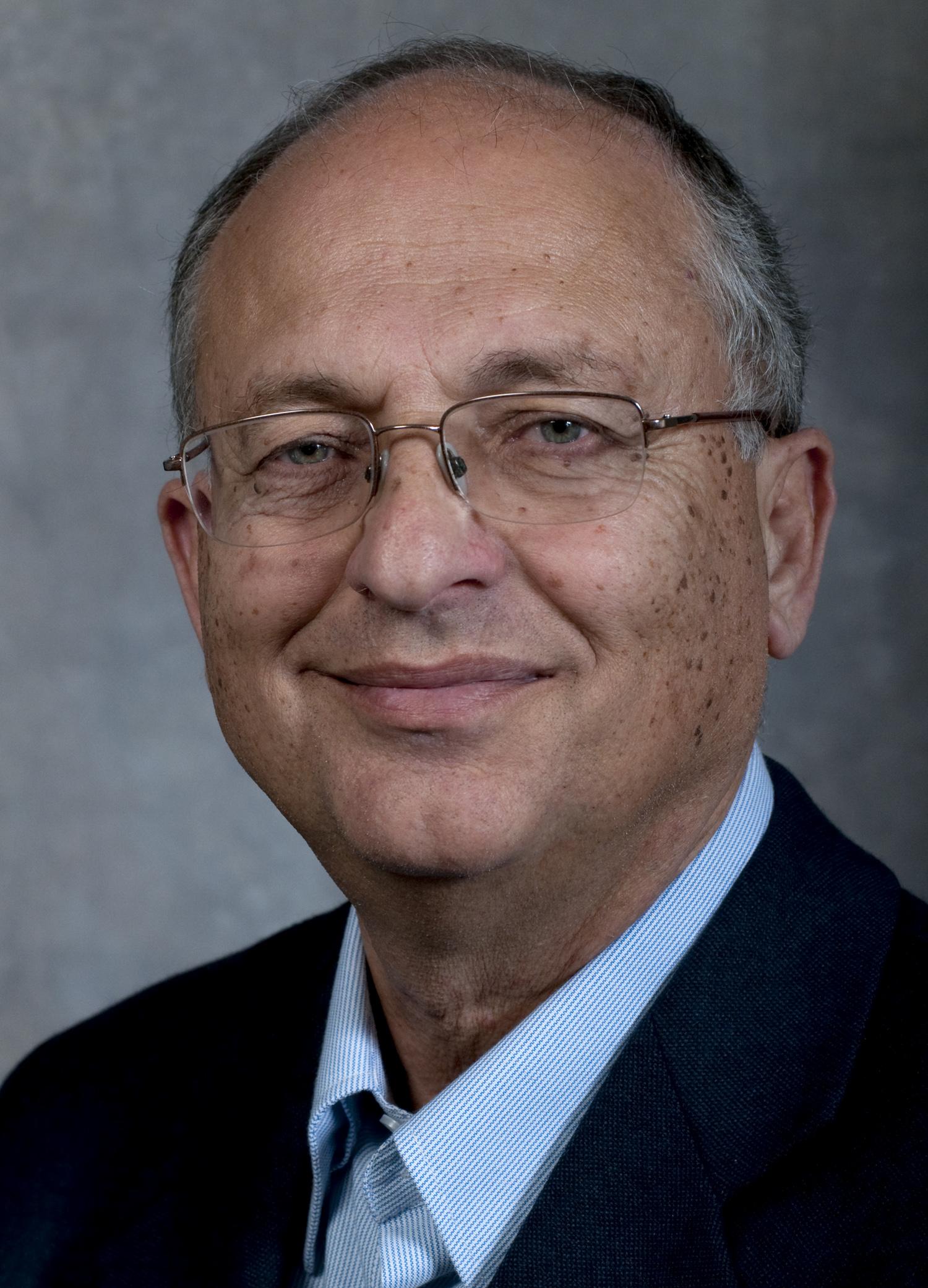
- Born: 1947 (age 78–79); Dăbuleni, Romania
- Scientific career
- Fields: Organic Chemistry
- Institutions: Ben-Gurion University of the Negev
- Website: in.bgu.ac.il/en/Pages/management/rector.aspx

Prof. Zvi HaCohen (last name HaCohen or Cohen, Hebrew: צבי הכהן, born 1947) is an Israeli scientist who, since August 2010, has served as Rector of Ben-Gurion University of the Negev (BGU) until 2018.

== Early life and education ==
HaCohen was born in Cluj, Romania in 1947, immigrated to Israel in 1950 and was raised in Rehovot. He received a BSc Degree in chemistry in 1970, an MSc Degree in organic chemistry in 1974, both from Bar-Ilan University and a PhD in organic chemistry in 1978, from the Weizmann Institute of Science. Between 1978 and 1981, he was a post doctoral fellow in the Department of Radiology at Harvard Medical School.

== Professional career ==
HaCohen published over 120 scientific papers, registered 8 patents and edited 3 books. During his PhD studies he developed a method for dry ozonation, which enabled regioselective hydroxylation of tertiary carbon atoms of hydrocarbons, with a yield of 100%, in comparison to a few tenths of a percent, previously. As a postdoctoral fellow, he designed a new contrast agent for computed tomography of liver metastasis, made of iodinated starch particles, which enabled the detection of liver metastasis, smaller than 2 mm. During his career at BGU, he studied the biochemistry and developed the biotechnology of the production of several omega 6 and omega 3 polyunsaturated fatty acids (e.g., arachidonic acid, eicosapentaenoic acid, dihomogammalinolenic acid) from micro algae and was involved with the development of the biotechnology of the micro alga Haematococcus pluvialis, culminated in the establishment of a commercial facility in Ketura, Israel.

== Academic and related positions ==
Between 1980 and 1981, . Hacohen had an appointment of assistant professor at the University of Massachusetts Medical School at Worcester, Massachusetts. In 1981, he moved to the Desert Research Institute of Ben-Gurion University at Sde Boker. Between 1996 and 2010, he served as chairman of the faculty association of the university and from 2005 to 2010, also as the chairman of Coordination Council of the Faculty Associations of the Israeli Universities. In 2010, he was elected as Rector of Ben-Gurion University of the Negev. In 2015 he was elected to chair the Rectors' Forum of Israeli Universities.

== Honors ==
1986–97 – Incumbent of the Sonnefeldt Career Development Chair in Desert Research.

1998 – Recipient of the Pasternak prize for Agricultural Research.

2005 – incumbent of the Maks and Rochelle Etingin Professorial chair in Desert Research.

2016 – Honorary professorship recipient, Babes-Bolyai university, Cluj, Romania.

== Books ==
•Cohen Z. (Ed.) (1999) Chemicals from micro algae.London: Taylor and Francis.

•Cohen Z. & Ratledge C. (Eds.) (2005) Single cell oil. Champaign Il.: American Oil Chemists' Society.

•Cohen Z. & Ratledge C. (Eds.) (2010) Single cell oils II. Champaign Il.: American Oil Chemists' Society.
