= Yuval Shahar =

Israeli computer scientist

- יובל שחר
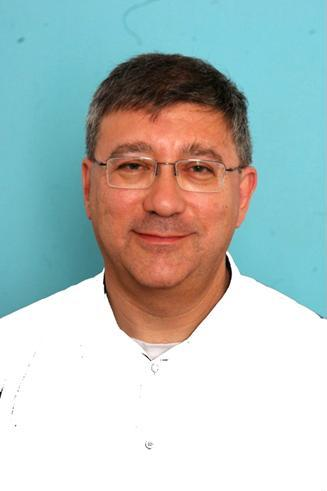
- Born: 1958 (age 67–68); Jerusalem
- Scientific career
- Fields: Artificial intelligence, medical informatics
- Institutions: Ben-Gurion University of the Negev
- Doctoral advisor: Mark Musen
- Website: ise.bgu.ac.il/faculty/shahar

Yuval Shahar (Hebrew: יובל שחר; born 1958) is an Israeli professor, physician, researcher, and computer scientist.

Shahar served as chair of the Ben Gurion University (BGU) Department of Software and Information Systems Engineering, the Josef Erteschik Chair in Information Systems Engineering, and head of the BGU Medical Informatics Research Center.

Shahar's research is on artificial intelligence in medicine with a focus on medical decision-support systems for physicians and patients, and automated knowledge discovery from time-oriented clinical data.

== Biography ==
Shahar was born in 1958 in Jerusalem. He studied medicine at the Hebrew University (1975–1981), while also taking courses in mathematics and computer science.

After an internship in the Soroka Medical Center (1982–1983), Shahar served as a physician in the Israel defense forces (IDF) Medical Corps. He was the head of the Medical Corps' Medical Informatics Section (1983–1988), and founded its Medical Informatics Branch. During that time, he pursued graduate studies in Mathematics and Computer Sciences at Bar-Ilan University (1985–1988). Shahar headed a 50-person team that, among other tasks, designed the Medical Corps' emergency-situations strategic decision-support system connecting 32 hospitals, and an early version of the IDF electronic medical record.

Shahar was the recipient of the 1988 US-Israel Fulbright Fellowship in the Natural Sciences area. He then traveled to Yale University, joining the Computer Science department. Shahar then worked on mobile-robot planning with Drew McDermott and received (1990) an M.Sc. in Computer Science (with a focus on Artificial Intelligence).

Shahar then went to Stanford University, where he obtained (1994) a Ph.D. (focusing on temporal reasoning in medicine) in the medical information sciences program.

== Scientific career ==
After a short post-doctoral period(1994–1995), Shahar stayed as a senior research scientist (1995–1997), and then (1997–2000) as an assistant professor of medicine (biomedical informatics) and as an assistant professor of computer science. Shahar worked on temporal reasoning and planning in medical domains

Shahar returned to Israel in 2000 and joined BGU, to found and head its Medical Informatics Research Center. He also became the second chair of the new department of information systems engineering at BGU's faculty of engineering.

== Career ==
Shahar's research has focused on temporal reasoning, temporal information visualization, temporal data mining, automated therapy administration, knowledge acquisition and representation, personal decision analysis, and group decision making. He has applied his work mostly in biomedical domains, as well in domains such as homeland security and information security.

Shahar served (2005–2008) as the Chair of the BGU Department of Information and Software Engineering and as the Deputy Dean for Research & Development of BGU's Faculty of Engineering (2003–2008). Since 2000, he is the head of the BGU Medical Informatics Research Center, which he had founded. In 2014, he was nominated as the Josef Erteschik Chair in Information Systems Engineering at BGU.

Since 1996, Shahar has served on the editorial boards of Artificial Intelligence in Medicine, The Journal of BioMedical Informatics, Methods of Information in Medicine, Applied Ontology, and (as Associate Editor) Knowledge and Information Systems. He was the Scientific co-chair of the international Artificial Intelligence in Medicine (AIME) conference in 1999 (Aalborg) and in 2009 (Verona).

== Awards ==
Shahar was granted in 1995 a NIH 5-year FIRST career award and an NSF award to explore the theoretical and practical implications of the temporal-reasoning methodology he had developed; in 2005 an IBM Faculty Award, and in 2008 an HP Worldwide Innovation Program award. During 2004 to 2007, He was the principal investigator and recipient of an IBM Shared University Research (SUR) equipment, software, and technical support award for academic centers of excellence, in collaboration with Prof. Shimon Slavin of the Department of Bone-Marrow Transplantation, Hadassa Medical Center.

In 2005, Shahar was elected as an International Fellow of the American College of Medical Informatics (ACMI). In 2015, he was awarded a Special Merit Award from the Israeli Chamber of Information Systems Analysts. In 2017, Shahar was elected as one of the 100 founding members of the International Academy of Health Sciences Informatics (IAHSI).
