= Limor Aharonson-Daniel =

Israeli Academic (born 1963)

- לימור אהרונסון-דניאל
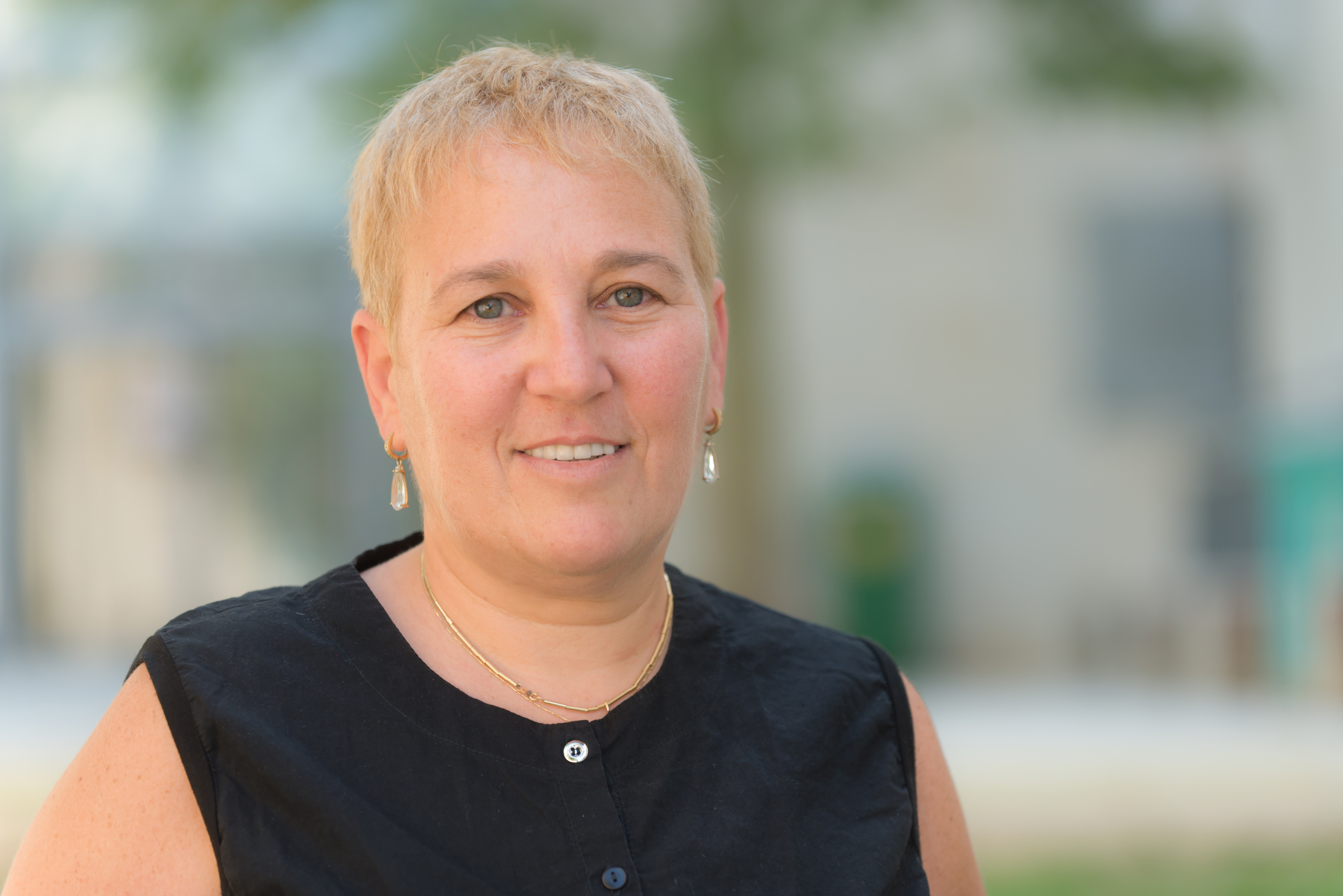
- Born: 1963 (age 62–63); Israel
- Scientific career
- Fields: Injury epidemiology
- Workplaces: Ben-Gurion University of the Negev
- Website: https://bgu.academia.edu/LimorAharonsonDaniel

Limor Aharonson-Daniel (Hebrew: לימור אהרונסון-דניאל) is an Israeli emergency preparedness and community resilience expert.

== Biography ==
Limor Aharonson-Daniel was born in Israel to Nurit and Ephraim Aharonson, a direct descendant of the Aharonson family of Zichron Yaakov. Married to Shlomo Daniel and mother to Edan Daniel-Hertz, Atai, Ohad and Eilam Daniel.

== Academic career ==
Aharonson-Daniel is the incoming Vice President for Global Engagement at Tel-Hai, University of Kiryat Shmona in the Galilee. Previously she served at Ben-Gurion University of the Negev (BGU) as Vice President for Global Engagement between 2019-2023, and Vice Rector for international academic affairs 2016-2019 . She is a full Professor in the Faculty of Health Sciences, School of Public Health. Limor is an international expert on injury epidemiology and played a significant role in the academization of the field of emergency preparedness and response and in the development of innovative approaches and tools for the study of emergency situations. Among these are the Barel body region by nature of injury diagnosis matrix, Multiple Injury Profiles and the Conjoint Community Resiliency Assessment Measure (CCRAM). She is the founding director of the PREPARED Center for Emergency Response Research at BGU.

Aharonson-Daniel joined BGU in 2008 after being the deputy director of The Israel National Center for Trauma and Emergency Medicine Research. In 2009 she founded the master's program in Emergency Medicine and the adjacent PREPARED research center at BGU. She headed the Department of Emergency Medicine between 2011 and 2016 when she was nominated as vice rector. Limor contributed to the field of coding and classification of injury. Several of her studies resulted in the development of innovative approaches and tools to facilitate practically oriented studies of disasters and emergency situations. Among these are the Barell Matrix Multiple Injury Profiles and the Conjoint Community Resiliency Assessment Measure. Other studies she led improved the provision of care during emergency situations to vulnerable populations, particularly deaf persons and chronically ill patients.

She has published extensively in leading peer-reviewed journals and authored several book chapters both on Injury Research Methods and on Disaster Preparedness Assessment. Prof. Aharonson-Daniel served on the editorial board of Injury Prevention journal for eight years and now serves on the editorial board of Injury Epidemiology journal and as a reviewer for several other journals. Prof. Aharonson-Daniel is a member of the CDCs' International Collaborative Effort (ICE) on injury statistics, core member of the Global Burden of Disease study 'Injuries Expert Group', the Society for the Advancement of Violence and Injury Research (SAVIR), the World Association of Disaster and Emergency Medicine (WADEM) where she served on the board of directors and as co-chair of the psychosocial section (2015-2017). Prof. Aharonson-Daniel is a member of the American Public Health Association (APHA) section on Injury Control and Emergency Health Services (ICEHS).
