= Eliahu Stern =

Israeli geographer (born 1948)

- אליהו שטרן
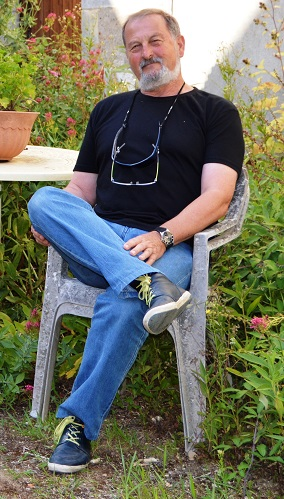
- Born: January 5, 1948 (age 78); Tel Aviv, Israel
- Scientific career
- Fields: Geography
- Institutions: Ben-Gurion University of the Negev
- Website: in.bgu.ac.il/humsos/geog/Pages/staff/eliyahu.aspx

Eliahu "Eli" Stern (Hebrew: אליהו שטרן; born January 5, 1948) is a professor emeritus of geography and planning in the Department of Geography & Environmental Development at Ben-Gurion University of the Negev, Israel, and former secretary of the IGU Commission of Applied Geography.

== Biography ==
Eliahu Stern, the oldest son of Debora and Itshak Stern, was born in Tel Aviv and grew up in Petach Tiqva and Ramat Gan, Israel. He completed both his undergraduate (in geography and archaeology) and graduate studies (M.A. in urban geography) at Tel Aviv University. His doctorate is from the University of Minnesota, involving three disciplines: geography, urban planning, and transport planning. This background directed his interdisciplinary research career as an applied geographer. While studying in Minnesota, he worked as a private planner on the land use scheme around Minneapolis–Saint Paul International Airport, and as an academic researcher at the University of Minnesota, he mapped for NASA the lakes of Minnesota using Satellite imagery. In 1976 he joined the department of geography at Ben-Gurion University and served as its chair twice, 1981–1982 and 1984–1988. Together with Avinoam Meir, he established the journal Geography Research Forum, which he edited for ten years (1983–1993).

He lectured and conducted research in several universities, including the University of Texas, Pretoria University, the University of New South Wales, and Delft University. Alongside his academic career, he was a researcher in the Chief Scientist's office of the Ministry of Transportation, assisted in establishing the Israeli Association of Transport Planning and Research and served as its third president for three years (1985–1987). Later, he was the president of the Israeli Geographical Association (1990–1992), and the Chair of Israel's Planners Association (2001–2005).

During the period 1980–2000, Stern was an active member and a group chair in the European Science Foundation NECTAR, a research network in transportation as well as in the American-European research network Stella, both dealing with behavioural aspects in transport.

Since 2003, he has also served as a member of the Israeli World Heritage Committee for UNESCO. During 2014 and 2015, he chaired the committee and assisted in nominating many of the Israeli sites to the World Heritage list. Since 2000, he has been the Israeli representative to the IGU Applied Geography Commission. In 2012, he was elected as Secretary of the commission. Currently, he is a member of the pioneering team for the preparation of the "Israel 100 strategic plan" for the year 2048.

== Research ==
Stern has been active mainly in three research areas: transportation, applied geography and urban & regional planning.

=== Transportation ===
The early studies of Stern in transportation dealt with the spatial patterns and the service level of urban and regional public transport, but his main contribution in this field was in the area of transport behaviour. He is among the first to study route choice, and jointly with Piet Bovy (from the Netherlands), they published one of the first leading books on that subject. The book is based on their various studies in which Stern developed research methodologies for choice behaviour as well as the principles and the applied implications which later have been adopted in the development of the current vehicle navigation systems. Another contribution is the wide study he conducted on drivers' choice mechanisms in congested situations using the American-developed Decision Field Theory. The theory served as a process-type framework within which he studied the effects of time pressure, accumulated experience, information, physical and behavioural thresholds, social norms, and cultural traits on the individual's choice behaviour.

=== Applied geography ===
As an applied geographer, Stern developed spatial models among which the most acknowledged are those based on micro-simulation. Two of them are worth mentioning.

The first is an evacuation model in situations of radiological threats.The model simulates the evacuation of the Israeli city of Dimona, with which decision-makers can evaluate the efficiency of evacuation strategies. Apart from its publicity in the literature, the model has been recognised by the Israeli civil emergency agencies and by the European network of risk evaluation.

The second model examines the effects of information on the travel and driving patterns as a way to ease congestion. A comparative study was conducted simultaneously in Israel, the Netherlands and Sweden to examine the role of culture and infrastructure quality on the simulated reactions of drivers to information.

In addition, Stern contributed to other applied topics among which are the allocation of subsidies to inter-city public transport, delineating registration zones for high schools, a scheduling model for urban development projects which has been adopted in South Africa and in China, and a location model for regional service centres. Lately he developed spatial search models for the location of new settlements and advanced the integration of GIS in spatial decision making.

=== Urban and regional planning ===
Stern is also known for his contributions in urban and regional planning and research. Jointly with Dalia Lichfield from London, they developed a method for dynamic master planning based on the concepts of functional areas and policy zones. The aim is to replace the zoning system with spatial policy. The method was successfully examined in the Israeli city of Ashkelon, and its principles were assimilated in the reform of the Israeli law of planning & construction.

Another breakthrough is the study and its consequence method for delineating and intra-zoning of biosphere reserves. This method and its guidelines were the basis for the preparation of a 'local masterplan for development and preservation' of the Lachish region. Other major contributions include the vision-based strategic plan for the city of Tel Aviv, Web-based public participation in planning, an international comparative study on planning tools, many regional and urban master and structure plans, and the preservation of urban historic landscapes and heritage sites.

== Consulting and public activity ==
Parallel to his academic career, he was a consultant to the economic division of the Ministry of Transportation, educational television, the banks union, the UNEP "Blue Plan", the Cross Israel Highway company, and he has served in numerous governmental and other public committees.

In 1988, he established a consulting company named EnviroPlan with Shaul Krakover. The projects conducted by the company were highly evaluated, and they have won the Local Israeli Government Award twice. In 2012, Stern received the Israel Planners Award from the Israel Planners Association.

== Publications ==
Stern's scientific publications include over 120 refereed articles in journals and edited volumes, over 100 research & planning reports and nine books:

- Gradus, Y. and Stern, E. (eds.), Beer Sheva, Keter Press Ltd., Jerusalem, 1979,(in Hebrew).
- Stern, E., Gradus, Y. Meir, A., Krakover, S., and Tzoar, H. (eds.), Atlas of the Negev, Keter Publishing House, Jerusalem, 1986, (in Hebrew and English).
- Stern, E. and Urman, D. (eds.), Man and Environment in the Southern Shefela, Massada Press, Givataaim, 1988, (in Hebrew).
- Stern, E. and Meir, A. (eds.), International Aspect of Metropolitan Systems, GRF 9, Transaction Books, New Jersey, 1989.
- Stern, E. and Bovy, P., Theory and Models of Route Choice Behaviour, (a shortened version of the following book number 6), Delft University Press, Delft, Netherlands, 1989.
- Bovy, P. and Stern, E., Route Choice: Wayfinding in Transportation Networks, Kluwer Academic Publishers, Dordrecht, 1990.
- Stern, E., Caravansaries: Roads and Inns, Karta Publishing House, Jerusalem, 1997.
- Stern, E., Salomon, I. And Bovy, P. (eds.), Travel Behavior – Spatial Patterns, Congestion and Modeling, Edward Elgar Publishing Co., Cheltenham. UK, 2002.
- Lombard, J., Stern, E., Clarke, G. (eds.), Applied Spatial Modelling and Planning, Routledge, Taylor & Francis Group, London and New York, 2017.
