= Hershkowitz =

Hershkowitz is a surname. Notable people with the surname include:

- Allen Hershkowitz, American environmentalist
- Daniel Hershkowitz (born 1953), Israeli politician, mathematician, rabbi and academic
- Fishel Hershkowitz (1922–2017), American Hasidic rabbi
- Marvin Hershkowitz (1931–2020), American basketball player and coach
- Noah Hershkowitz (1941–2020), American plasma physicist
- Sara Hershkowitz (born 1980), American soprano
- Vic Hershkowitz (1918–2008), American handball player
- Zeev Hershkowitz, Israeli footballer
- Yankele Hershkowitz, street singer during the Holocaust

== See also ==
- Hershkovits
- Hershkovitz
- Hershkovich
- Herschkowitz
- Hirschovits
- Hirschowitz
- Hirszowicz
- Herskovic
- Herskovits
- Herskovitz
- Herskowitz
- Herscovici
- Herscovics
- Herchcovitch
- Gershkovich
- Gershkovitch
- Geršković
- Girshovich
