= Hirschowitz =

Hirschowitz is a surname. Notable people with the surname include:

- Basil Hirschowitz (1925–2013), American gastroenterologist and academic
- Gabé Hirschowitz, Australian-American art dealer, author and lifestyle journalist

== See also ==
- Alexander–Hirschowitz theorem

- Hirschovits
- Hirszowicz
- Hershkowitz
- Hershkovits
- Hershkovitz
- Hershkovich
- Herschkowitz
- Herskovic
- Herskovits
- Herskovitz
- Herskowitz
- Herscovici
- Herscovics
- Herchcovitch
- Gershkovich
- Gershkovitch
- Geršković
- Girshovich
