= Herskowitz =

Herskowitz is a surname. Notable people with the surname include:

- Carol Herskowitz (died 2007), American politician
- Ira Herskowitz (1946–2003), American geneticist
- Mickey Herskowitz (born 1933), American journalist and biographer
- Moti Herskowitz, Israeli chemical engineer and academic

== See also ==
- Hershkovits
- Hershkovitz
- Hershkovich
- Hershkowitz
- Herschkowitz
- Hirschovits
- Hirschowitz
- Hirszowicz
- Herskovic
- Herskovits
- Herskovitz
- Herscovici
- Herscovics
- Herchcovitch
- Gershkovich
- Gershkovitch
- Geršković
- Girshovich
