= Herscovici =

Herscovici (Romanian: Herșcovici) is a surname. Notable people with the surname include:

- Andrée Geulen-Herscovici (1921–2022), Belgian teacher and resistance fighter
- Henry Herscovici (1927–1922), Israeli sports shooter
- Paul Păun (born Zaharia Herșcovici; 1915–1994), Romanian-Israeli poet and visual artist

== See also ==
- Herscovici classification

- Hershkowitz
- Hershkovits
- Hershkovitz
- Hershkovich
- Herschkowitz
- Hirschovits
- Hirschowitz
- Hirszowicz
- Herskovic
- Herskovits
- Herskovitz
- Herskowitz
- Herscovics
- Herchcovitch
- Gershkovich
- Gershkovitch
- Geršković
- Girshovich
