= Hershkovits =

Hershkovits is a surname. Notable people with the surname include:

- David Hershkovits, American writer and publisher
- Nitai Hershkovits (born 1988), Israeli pianist and composer

== See also ==
- Hershkowitz
- Hershkovitz
- Hershkovich
- Herschkowitz
- Hirschovits
- Hirschowitz
- Hirszowicz
- Herskovic
- Herskovits
- Herskovitz
- Herskowitz
- Herscovici
- Herscovics
- Herchcovitch
- Gershkovich
- Gershkovitch
- Geršković
- Girshovich
