= Hershkovitz =

Hershkovitz is a surname. Notable people with the surname include:

- Henry Hershkovitz (1927–1922), Israeli sports shooter
- Israel Hershkovitz (born 1950), Israeli anthropologist and anatomist
- Mark Alan Hershkovitz, American biochemist and taxonomist
- Philip Hershkovitz (1909–1997), American mammalogist

== See also ==
- Hershkowitz
- Hershkovits
- Hershkovich
- Herschkowitz
- Hirschovits
- Hirschowitz
- Hirszowicz
- Herskovic
- Herskovits
- Herskovitz
- Herskowitz
- Herscovici
- Herscovics
- Herchcovitch
- Gershkovich
- Gershkovitch
- Geršković
- Girshovich
