= Herskovitz =

Herskovitz is a surname. Notable people with the surname include:

- Marshall Herskovitz (born 1952), American film director, writer and producer
- Paula Ackerman (née Herskovitz; 1893–1989), first American female rabbi

== See also ==
- Hershkowitz
- Hershkovits
- Hershkovitz
- Hershkovich
- Herschkowitz
- Hirschovits
- Hirschowitz
- Hirszowicz
- Herskovic
- Herskovits
- Herskowitz
- Herscovici
- Herscovics
- Herchcovitch
- Gershkovich
- Gershkovitch
- Geršković
- Girshovich
