= Gershkovich =

Gershkovich is a surname. Notable people with the surname include:

- Evan Gershkovich (born 1991), American reporter covering Russia
- Mikhail Gershkovich (born 1948), Soviet and Russian football player and coach
- Mikhail Makarenko (born Moishe Gershkovich; 1931–2007), Romanian-born Soviet human rights activist
- Philip Gershkovich (1906–1989), Romanian-born Soviet composer and music theorist

== See also ==
- Gershkovitch
- Geršković
- Girshovich
- Hershkovits
- Hershkovitz
- Hershkowitz
- Herschkowitz
- Hirschovits
- Hirschowitz
- Hirszowicz
- Herskovic
- Herskovits
- Herskovitz
- Herskowitz
- Herscovici
- Herscovics
- Herchcovitch
