= Herskovic =

Herskovic (Serbo-Croatian: Heršković) is a surname. Notable people with the surname include:

- Adolf Herskovic (1916–2011), Croatian and Yugoslav table tennis player
- William Herskovic (1914–2006), Hungarian-born Holocaust survivor and humanitarian

== See also ==
- Hershkowitz
- Hershkovits
- Hershkovitz
- Hershkovich
- Herschkowitz
- Hirschovits
- Hirschowitz
- Hirszowicz
- Herskovits
- Herskovitz
- Herskowitz
- Herscovici
- Herscovics
- Herchcovitch
- Gershkovich
- Gershkovitch
- Geršković
- Girshovich
