= Herskovits =

Herskovits is a surname. Notable people with the surname include:

- Jean Herskovits (1935–2019), American historian and academic
- Melville J. Herskovits (1895–1963), American anthropologist

== See also ==
- Hershkovits
- Hershkovitz
- Hershkovich
- Hershkowitz
- Herschkowitz
- Hirschovits
- Hirschowitz
- Hirszowicz
- Herskovic
- Herskovitz
- Herskowitz
- Herscovic
- Herscovics
- Herchcovitch
- Gershkovich
- Gershkovitch
- Geršković
- Girshovich
