= Papirosn =

Yiddish song

External videos
- "Papirosn" by Dudu Fisher, YouTube video

Original cover

"Papirosn" (Yiddish: פּאַפּיראָסן, transl. Cigarettes) is a Yiddish song that was written in the 1920s. The song tells the story of a Jewish boy who sells cigarettes to survive on the streets. He depicts his tragic fate; having lost his parents, his younger sister has died on the bench, and eventually he loses his own hope.

The song's author Herman Yablokoff was a member of the Yiddish theater that was active in Lithuania and Poland in the years following World War I. He was inspired by children who tried to make a living selling cigarettes in the streets. The sight of the children reminded him of his childhood in World War I in Grodno, where he tried selling cigarettes to passers-by.

Yablokoff emigrated to the United States in 1924; the song was published in an American radio program in Yiddish in 1932 and became a hit as part of a musical of the same name that premiered in 1935, which interpolated a silent movie in which Sidney Lumet played the Jewish boy. Many music sheets of the song were sold.

The song was not officially prohibited in the Soviet Union but it was usually played at private events—it was seldom allowed to be played in public because it was argued that the lyrics were not about Soviet Jews.

== Contrafact ==
The song was originally a contrafact, and this practice continued in ghettos and camps during the Second World War. The melody of the song was first documented as an “unnamed melody” recorded in 1929 by Russian ethnomusicologist Moisei Beregovsky (track 25 of Historical Collection of Jewish Musical Folklore 1912-1947 Vol 6). It was also published in 1920 by Abe Schwartz as “Freilach #317”. It is nearly identical to the Bulgarian folksong Аз съм Гошо Хубавеца ("I am Gosho, the handsome one"). Ethnomusicologist Gila Flam found out that two songs with different lyrics but the same melody were published by Nachum Shternheim in Prague during and after World War I, titled "Dos Redl" (The wheel) and "Di Parodye Zum Redl" (Parody on the wheel).

"Papirosn" was later amended to mirror the tribulations of the Holocaust in the ghettos of Poland and Lithuania. The song was used as a base for many Holocaust songs in the Lodz and Vilna Ghettos, among others. Shmerke Kaczerginski found two alternate versions of the song, both of which share the tune of the original but have different stories: One version was written by Yankele Hershkowitz, a famous street singer from the Lodz Ghetto; it follows the story of the original song but tells a story about ration coupons in the Ghetto. The other version, written by Jewish poet Rikle Glezer, describes the Ponary massacre. An additional version from the Warsaw Ghetto makes a direct allusion to the original but the boy sells ghetto black bread instead of cigarettes. There have been other versions of the song, including non-Yiddish versions.
