= Sternheim =

Sternheim or Shternheim is a German and Yiddish (שטרנהיים) surname. Notable people with the surname include:

- Alfredo Sternheim (1909–1996), Brazilian film director and screenwriter, journalist, and writer
- Arie Goral-Sternheim (1878–1942), German painter and publicist
- Carl Sternheim (1878–1942), German playwright and short story writer
- Julius Sternheim (1881–1940), German screenwriter, film producer and production manager
- Maria Anna Antonia Sternheim, pen name of Marianne Ehrmann (1755–1795), one of the first women novelists, publicists and journalists in the German-speaking countries
- Mopsa Sternheim (1905–1954), German stage and costume designer and World War II resistance fighter in France
- Nachum Shternheim (1879–1942), Jewish poet, composer, and songwriter who wrote in Yiddish
- Thea Sternheim (1883–1971), German author
