= Bučje, Croatia =

Bučje, Croatia may refer to:

- Bučje, Pleternica
- Bučje, Pakrac
