= Vladislav Soyfer =

Ukrainian classical composer (1961–2021)

- Russian: Владислав Анатольевич Сойфер
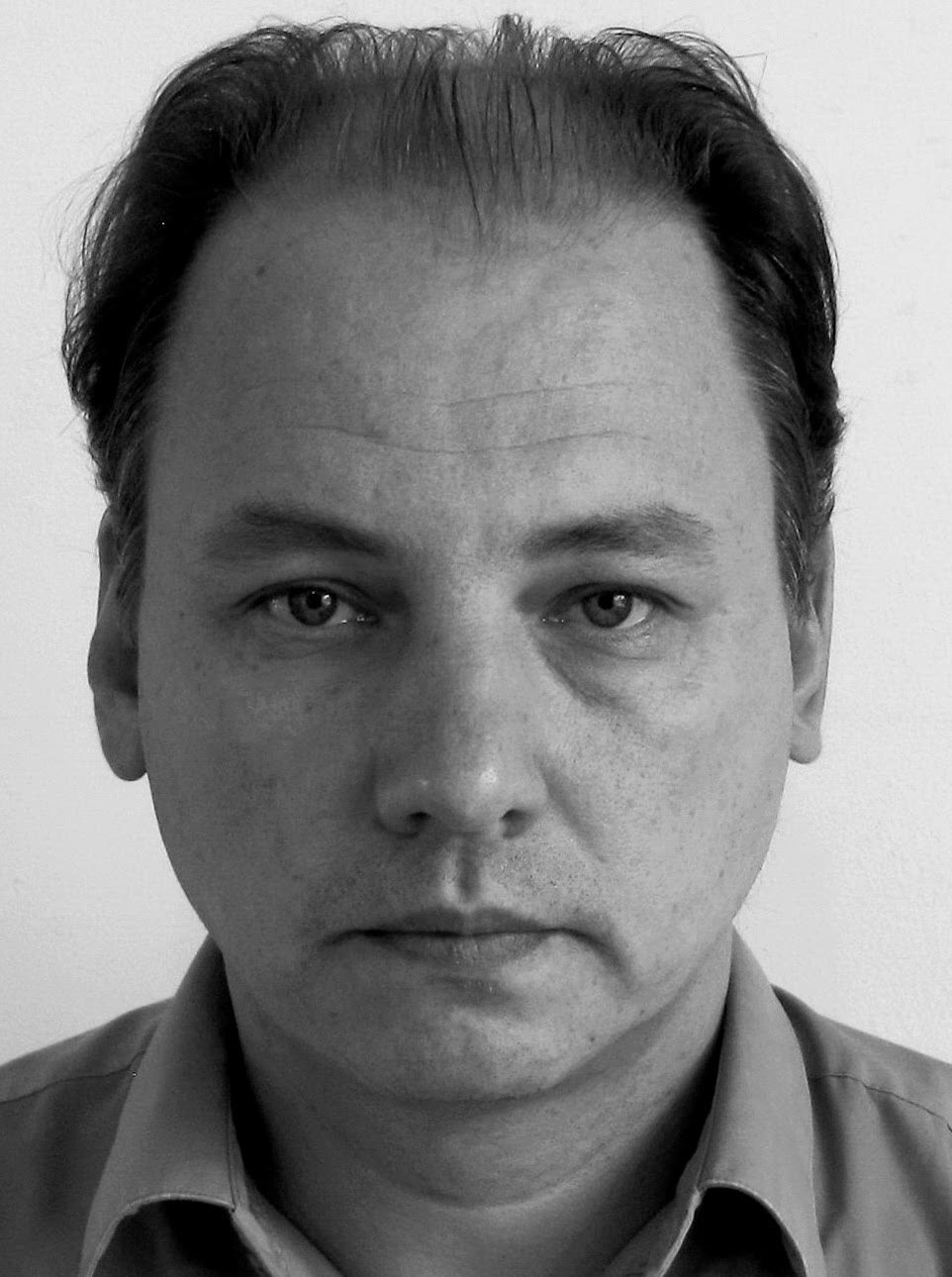
- Born: July 16, 1961; Kharkiv, Ukraine
- Died: July 31, 2021 (aged 60); Playas del Coco, Costa Rica
- Other name: Soifer
- Education: Moscow Conservatory
- Occupations: Composer, music teacher, arranger, translator
- Style: Twelve-tone technique

Vladislav Soyfer (Russian: Владисла́в Анато́льевич Со́йфер, 16 July 1961 — 31 July 2021) was a composer, music teacher, arranger, and translator.

== Biography ==
Born in Kharkiv, Ukrainian SSR (present-day Ukraine), Soyfer spent his childhood in Tashkent before moving to Moscow. He initially enrolled at the Moscow Land Development Institute but later followed his passion for music by entering the October Revolution Music School. (Note: Now Moscow Schnittke State Institute of Music) There, he studied under Vasily Gorbatov, a blind musician and music theorist. Concurrently, Soyfer served in a military band.

From 1984 to 1989, Soyfer studied composition at the Moscow Conservatory under Edison Denisov, Nikolai Sidelnikov, and others. His most significant musical development, however, came through private lessons with the Romanian-born composer Philip Herschkowitz between 1986 and 1989. A student of Alban Berg and Anton Webern, Herschkowitz had a profound influence on Soyfer, who dedicated his work to continuing the traditions of the Second Viennese School.

From 1989 to 1996, Soyfer also attended lectures as a non-degree student in the philosophy and philology faculties at Moscow State University. These included lectures by Mikhail Gasparov, Sergey Averintsev, and Alexander Dobrokhotov.

In Moscow, Soyfer collaborated as an arranger with the "Studio of New Music" and the "Premiere ensemble" (Note: formerly called "the New Names") In 2004, Soyfer, he and his friend composer Faraj Garayev participated in the project “Russia-Austria: 100 Years of Modernity”, organized by the Moscow Forum Festival.

In 2007, Soyfer relocated to Costa Rica with his daughter. There, he taught solfeggio, harmony, counterpoint, composition, orchestration, musical form, and piano. He also created musical arrangements and edited scores for several Costa Rican orchestras, including the Symphonic Orchestra of Heredia (from 2012) and the National Symphonic Orchestra of Costa Rica. His arrangements of five Schubert songs for children's choir and chamber orchestra were performed by the SINEM (Note: National System of Musical Education) choir and orchestra in April 2017.

According to the composer and conductor Eddie Mora, Vladislav Soyfer had the ability to incorporate the essential elements for creating a musical score, presenting it in any musical format with the necessary clarity.

In early 2021, Soyfer and his daughter moved to Playas del Coco, a coastal town on the Pacific. He died of a heart attack at his home on 31 July 2021, at the age of 60.

== Selected compositions ==
Vladislav Soyfer's compositions encompassed various genres and instrumentations. Notable works include:

=== Orchestral Works ===
- "7 Haikus", a suite for orchestra consisting of seven movements: "Rain in the bamboo forest", "The ivy twines around the hanging bridge", "The cicada is floating down the river on a yellow leaf", "The song and the death of the cicada", "The moon is rising over the abandoned village", "Sparrows in the storm", and "Autumn evening". First performed in April 2024. According to the author's note, the composition is an homage to the 17th-century Japanese poet Matsuo Bashō and the pieces reproduce images from his haikus; however, they aren't directly related to any particular poems "shouldn't be treated as illustrations". The structure of each piece reflects the metrical structure of haiku poems.
- "A song with movement" (Canción con movimiento), for soprano and orchestra, set to the verses of Federico García Lorca (2014).

=== Ensemble and Other Works ===
- Postludio for violin and piano, (written in 1986, first performed the same year, first published in 2025)
- "3 old-style polyphonic miniatures", for oboe and clarinet (written in 2011, first published in 2025).
- "Adagio", for 17 string instruments (2006).
- "Fantasia and scherzo", for piano and violin (written in 1983-1986, first performed in 1986, edited in 2010 and published in 2025).
- "Langsam und Schmachtend", a postlude for bass clarinet and cello (2010, first published in 2025).
- "A vocal poem" on the verses of J. R. Jiménez (1984).
- "Invention - duet" for viola and cello (1998).
- "Flute variations" for flulte and piano (1999).

=== Piano Works ===
- "Piano variations" (2014).
- "Selected piano music" (2010), a collection including "Little sonata for piano", "Three eleven-bar bagatelles", and "Five motives". This collection was published in 2023.
- "5 piano miniatures" (2012).

=== Choral Works ===
- "The storm has passed" (Гроза прошла), a choral piece set to the verses of A. Blok (1992).
- Two canons, a setting of verses by Mikhail Lomonosov, including "Narcissus over clear water" (Нарцисс над ясною водою) and "Is it not Orpheus himself striking the harp?" (Не сам ли в арфу ударяет Орфей) - written in 1993-1994.
- Two choirs on the verses by M. Lomonosov (1993), a composition of the same name on the verses by F. Tyutchev (1993) and Three choirs on the verses by A. Fet.
- Three little canons on Latin texts (1997-1998).

=== Other Instrumental Works ===
- "Three little poems", for flute (written in 1997, reviewed in 2011, first published in 2025).
- "Three Greek poems", for cello (2010).

The author's note to "7 Haikus" gives some instructions on how it should be performed:

"...The pieces were composed in a manner that doesn't leave much liberty to performers. The key to a good performance is precision. The utmost attention should be paid to the indications of dynamics, which are usually divided into several layers. The technique of orchestration used in this score requires very clear distinguishing between "real sounds" and "subsounds" or "aftersounds". The latters are always marked sotto voce."

== Performances ==
In 1986, a recording was made of several Soyfer's compositions, performed by himself and several other ensemblists; this appears to be the only remaining performance by the author himself.

During his time in Costa Rica, many of Soyfer’s arrangements, including those of Bach and Schubert, were performed at various venues throughout the country.

On April 20, 2015, the Azerbaijan State Symphonic Orchestra performed Soyfer’s “Canción con movimiento” at the Qara Qarayev Music Festival. Additionally, in December 2016, Soyfer's "reconstruction" of Mozart's concerto for four wind soloists and orchestra was performed at the Moscow Conservatory.

Following Soyfer's death, several of his works received their premiere performances. On September 21, 2022, "Three eleven-bar bagatelles" were performed in Moscow at the Bogolyubov Art Library, and "Five motives" were performed in April 2023. Both pieces were also performed at various Moscow venues in 2024. On June 4, 2023, "Three bagatelles", arranged for orchestra by Faraj Garayev, were performed at the Beethoven Hall of the Bolshoi Theatre by the theater's chamber orchestra, conducted by Mikhail Tsinman.

Further performances of Soyfer's work include an arrangement of Grieg's "Eight lyric pieces" which was performed in Italy in 2023. In 2024, Soyfer’s "7 haikus" for orchestra were premiered in Costa Rica, conducted by Alejandro Gutiérrez. This performance was particularly significant as Soyfer had given the score to Gutiérrez before his death; it was performed by the OSUCR, the professional orchestra of the University of Costa Rica.

== Teaching legacy ==
Vladislav Soyfer's teaching had a significant impact on many students, some of whom have pursued international careers. Pianist and conductor Luis Castillo-Briceño, reflecting on Soyfer's influence in a 2022 interview, said:

"One of the people who influenced me a lot was my teacher, Vladislav Soyfer – who is no longer alive, who introduced me to the world of conducting when I was 14 years old. We come from a tradition that stretches back to Schönberg; so this way of thinking and seeking knowledge has always shaped my position in art."

Notable pupils of Soyfer include the conductor and pianist Luis Castillo-Briceño, composer Gianca Liano, cellist Marco Gutierrez; he has taught the pianists Giuseppe Gil, César Salazar, and Rodrigo Picado, as well as many others. For some time he maintained a close relationship with double bass virtuoso Rinat Ibragimov, who was the principal bass of the London Symphony Orchestra. Although not a formal student, his daughter Alina Ibragimova also received lessons from Soyfer. Following Ibragimov's death from COVID-19 on September 2, 2020, Soyfer translated a short Chinese poem as a tribute to his friend.

== Literary work ==
Beyond his musical pursuits, Vladislav Soyfer was also a writer and translator. He produced original poetry and translated literary works from multiple languages into Russian. In December 2022, a collection of his essays, translations, and poems was published in Jerusalem under the title "Jacob's ladder". According to Rachel Torpusman, the book’s publisher, Jacob’s Ladder is "not a religious book" but rather "an essay about culture and civilization – and about falling out of them; some parodic retellings of biblical and ancient Greek verses; some very deep reflections on Chinese philosophy, on Shakespeare and Lorca, on politics and history of the past and the present…"

Soyfer's translations encompassed a wide array of literary works:

- From English: Fragments of plays by William Shakespeare (including Hamlet, Macbeth, King Lear, and others) and works by other English poets such as P.B. Shelley, Edward Lear, T.S. Eliot, Alfred Tennyson, William Blake and Emma Lazarus.
- from German: Works by Paul Gerhardt, Paul Celan, Stefan George, Martin Luther, Mathilde Wesendonck, Georg Trakl, Friedrich Rückert, Heinrich Heine, Rainer Maria Rilke, Hans Bethge, Johann Burmeister, Johann Rist, Georg Christian Lehms, Caspar Neumann, Johann Franck, and fragments from Bach’s St Matthew Passion (author unknown).
- from Spanish: Poems by Federico García Lorca and Spanish romances.
- From Italian: Works by Torquato Tasso and Lorenzo Da Ponte (fragments from two opera librettos);
- From Latin: Works by Catullus and Virgil.
- From ancient Greek: Works by Simonides and Heraclitus.

In his later years, Soyfer began studying Chinese and translated poems and philosophical texts by various ancient Chinese poets and philosophers, including Confucius, Laozi, Mencius, Sun Tzu, Du Fu, Li Bai, Li Yu, Wang Wei and Pei Di. One of his final projects was an analysis and translation of the first chapter of the Lun Yu. Many of these translations were published in his blogs on Dreamwidth and Blogger platforms.

== Memory ==
In 2022, Gianca Liano, one of Vladislav Soyfer's former students, composed a tombeau titled Orilla ("The shore") in his memory. This piece was premiered at the Milan Conservatory "Giuseppe Verdi" on March 12, 2022.

== Bibliography ==
=== Books ===
- Soyfer, Vladislav (2020a). Конфуций. Лунь Юй. Глава 1. Разбор и перевод на русский ["Lun Yu" by Confucius, 1st Chapter. Analysis and Translation into Russian] (PDF) (in Russian).
- Soyfer, Vladislav (2022a). Soyfer, Varvara (ed.). Лестница Иакова: эссе, переводы, стихи [Jacob's Ladder: Essays, Translations, Poems] (in Russian). Jerusalem: Rachel Torpusman (published 2022). ISBN 978-965-7006-11-5.
- Soyfer, Vladislav (2023a). Selected Piano Music. Compozitor Saint-Petersburg. ISMN 979-0-3522-1990-8.
- Soyfer, Vladislav (2023b). "Selected Piano Music". compozitor.spb.ru. Compozitor Saint-Petersburg. Archived from the original on 2025-02-01.
- Soyfer, Vladislav (2025a). Chamber music. Selected composition. Compozitor Saint-Petersburg. ISMN 979-0-3522-2160-4.

== Sources ==
- Studio New Music (2002). "Музыка России и Германии первой половины ХХ века" [Music of Russia and Germany in the First Half of the 20th Century]. studionewmusic.ru (in Russian). Archived from the original on 2021-07-30.
- Moscow Forum (2004). "Moscow Forum: Selected projects" (PDF). mosforumfest.ru. Archived (PDF) from the original on 2025-02-04.
- Studio New Music (2011). "Европа глазами россиян. Россия глазами европейцев" [Europe through the eyes of Russians. Russia through the eyes of Europeans]. studionewmusic.ru (in Russian). Archived from the original on 2022-07-03.
- Platonov Fest (2011). "Музыка воздуха и металла" [Music of Air and Metal]. platonovfest.com (in Russian). Archived from the original on 2025-02-01.
- Qara Qarayev Music Festival (2015a). "The 6th Qara Qarayev International Contemporary Music Festival. Program". Archived from the original on 2025-01-14.
- Qara Qarayev Music Festival (2015b). "The 6th Qara Qarayev International Contemporary Music Festival. Press". Archived from the original on 2025-01-24.
- La Nación (2017). "Eddie Mora estrena disco, obra y edición de 31 partituras" [Eddie Mora premieres album, work and edition of 31 scores]. nacion.com (in Spanish). Archived from the original on 2025-02-01.
- GAM Cultural (2017). "Schubert cantado por niños". gamcultural.com (in Spanish). Archived from the original on 2025-02-04.
- Orquesta Sinfónica Nacional (2018). "Orquesta Sinfónica Nacional tocará nuevas obras de compositores costarricenses". cnm.go.cr (in Spanish). Archived from the original on 2022-07-03.
- GAM Cultural (2019). "10 Canciones Espirituales de Bach" [10 Spiritual Songs by Bach]. gamcultural.com (in Spanish). Archived from the original on 2024-11-27.
- Premiera. Discography (2020). "Дискография. Премьера" [Discography. Premiera]. amupremiere.ru (in Russian). Archived from the original on 2025-02-01.
- Premiera. Repertoire (2020). "Репертуар. Премьера" [Repertoire. Premiera]. amupremiere.ru (in Russian). Archived from the original on 2025-02-02.
- Slippedisc (2020). "London Mourns a Prominent Double Bass". slippedisc.com. Archived from the original on 2025-01-24.
- Sinfonica de Heredia (2021). "Costa Rica Bicentenaria". sinfonicadeheredia.com (in Spanish). Archived from the original on 2024-09-15.
- Castillo-Briceño, Luis (2022). "…να έχω το προνόμιο να απολαμβάνω τη μουσική στο έπακρο…" ["...To have the privilege of enjoying music to the fullest..."]. naftemporiki.gr (in Greek). Archived from the original on 2023-06-09.
- Liano, Gianca (2022). "World Premiere "Orilla, tombeau pour Vladislav Soifer" at the Conservatorio di Milano "Giuseppe Verdi"". giancaliano.com. Archived from the original on 2022-07-03.
- Bolshoi (2023). "Dedication to Anton Webern". bolshoi.ru. Archived from the original on 2023-08-27.
- Gutiérrez, Alejandro (2024). "Haikus: A Musical Tribute to Vladislav Soyfer". alejandrogutierrezcr.com. Archived from the original on 2025-02-02.
- Soyfer, Vladislav (2016). "die Jakobsleiter". dreamwidth.org.
- Soyfer, Vladislav (2020b). "Profile". Blogger.com.
