= Chaim Noy =

Professor of media and communication

- חיים נוי
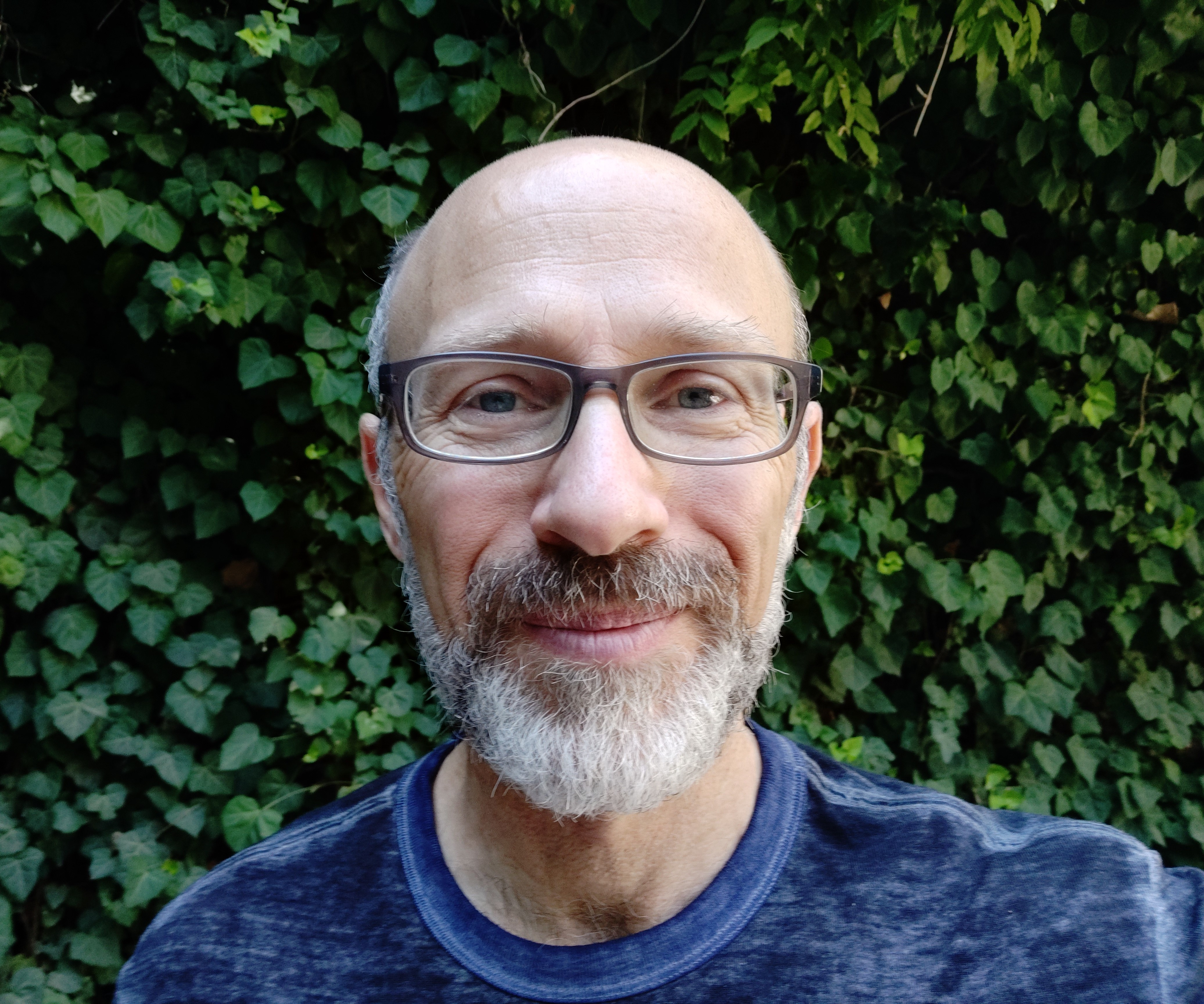
- Born: 1 July 1968 (age 58)
- Education: Bar-Ilan University, Hebrew University
- Scientific career
- Fields: media Communication; Discourse
- Workplaces: Bar-Ilan University, University of South Florida
- Thesis: The Great Journey: Narrative Analysis of Israeli Trekking Stories (2002)

Chain Noy (Hebrew: חיים נוי; born: 1 July 1968) is an Israeli media and communication professor and the Chair of the School of Communication at Bar-Ilan University. He is the immediate past Chair of the Israeli Communication Association (ISCA), and the Vice President – International Association for Dialogue Analysis (IADA). Noy previously taught at the Department of Communication at the University of South Florida.

Noy's research employs qualitative, discursive and ethnographic approaches to mediated and face-to-face communication events and environments. His foci are on affordances of communication and in older and newer media, which he studies in contexts of contemporary travel, tourism, museums, and political activism.

Noy has written three books, published over 80 academic publications, as well as contributed numerous conference papers. For his book, Thank You for Dying for Our Country: Commemorative Texts and Performances in Jerusalem (Oxford University Press, 2015), Noy received the Best Book Award by the Israeli Communication Association.

== Early life and education ==
Chaim Noy was born in Jerusalem, to his parents Prof. Dov Noy, and Dr. Tamar Noy. He studied at Gymnasia Rehavia, and served in the IDF in the Intelligence Corps. He received his B.A. in Psychology and Biblical Studies from Bar-Ilan University (summa cum laude) in 1994, and his M.A. in Clinical Psychology, Department of Psychology, The Hebrew University of Jerusalem (summa cum laude) in 1996.

Noy earned his Ph.D. degree in 2002 from the Department of Psychology, The Hebrew University of Jerusalem. Title: “The Great Journey: Narrative Analysis of Israeli Trekking Stories”. Advisors: Prof. Amia Lieblich, Prof. Yoram Bilu. In 2001–2002, Noy was a Rothschild's (Yad Hanadiv) Post-Doctorate Fellowship Tenure.

== Academic career ==
During 2003 – 2008 Noy was a Visiting Lecturer at the Noah Mozes Department of Communication and Journalism, and the Department of Sociology and Anthropology, The Hebrew University of Jerusalem. In 2009–2012 he worked as a Senior Lecturer at the School of Communication, Sapir Academic College. During 2011 – 2012, Noy was on the Ruth Meltzer Distinguished Fellowship at the Herbert D. Katz Center for Advanced Judaic Studies, University of Pennsylvania, USA.

In 2012 Noy became an associate professor at the Department of Communication, University of South Florida. He returned to Israel in 2015 and worked as an associate professor at the Department of Tourism Studies, Ashkelon Academic College. In 2018 Noy joined the School of Communication at Bar Ilan University as an associate professor.

== Research ==
Noy's research areas include Media and Communication Studies, Language and Social Interaction, Linguistic Anthropology, Discourse Analysis and Writing Practices, and Tourism and Museum Studies. He often makes use of qualitative approaches and Ethnography of Communication.

== Professional Experience ==
- 2019 – Present: Vice President – International Association for Dialogue Analysis (IADA)
- 2019 – Present: Founder and (co-)Chair (together with Prof. Miriam Eliav-Feldon, Tel Aviv University) of the Forum of Heads of Academic Associations in the Social Sciences, Humanities and the Arts in Israel
- 2018 – Present: Chair, Israel Communication Association (ISCA)
- 2016 – Present: Executive Board Member: The Israeli Anthropological Association
- 2016 – Present: Executive Board Member: The Israeli Center for Qualitative Research of People and Societies (ICQM), Ben-Gurion University of the Negev
- 2015 – Present: Editorial Board Member: International Journal of Social Research Methodology: Theory and Practice (Routledge/Taylor Francis).
- 2007 – Present: Associate Editor: Annals of Tourism Research (Elsevier).

== Publications ==
Prof. Noy has authored over 80 scientific publications and has written 3 books. His book “Thank You for Dying for Our Country” (New York: Oxford University Press) has won the Best Book Award by the Israeli Communication Association (ISCA) in 2016. The Award Committee noted that “the book expands the scope of the field of Media and Communication Studies beyond mass communication” and that it “embodies a rigorous and well-founded ethnographic approach, which brings together various means through which data is collected”. His article “Mediation Materialized: The Semiotics of a Visitor Book at an Israeli Commemoration Site” won the Jean Widmer Award by Fribourg University, Switzerland, in 2010.

=== Books ===
- Noy, C. (2015). “Thank You for Dying for Our Country: Commemorative Texts and Performances in Jerusalem.” New York: Oxford University Press.
- Noy, C. (2007). “Narrative Community: Voices of Israeli Backpackers.” Detroit: Wayne State University Press.
- Noy, C. and Cohen, E. (Eds.), (2005). “Israeli Backpackers: From Tourism to a Rite of Passage.” A co-edited volume. Albany, N.Y.: State University of New York Press.

=== Selected articles ===
- Navon, S., and Noy, C. "Conceptualizing social media sub-platforms: The case of mourning and memorialization practices on Facebook." New Media & Society
- Noy, C. (2021). "Theorising comment books as historical sources: towards a performative and interpretive framework." Studies in Travel Writing, 25(3), 235-255
- Noy, C. (2020). "Museum Audience’s Texts: Toward a Contextual Conceptual Reading." Visitor Studies, 24(1), 38-57
- Noy, C. 2020). "Gestures of closure: A small stories approach to museumgoers' texts." Text & Talk, 40(6), 733-753
- Noy, C. (2019). "Voices on display: Handwriting, paper, and authenticity, from museums to social network sites." Convergence, 26(5-6), 1315-1332
- Noy, C. (2017). “Participatory Media and Discourse in Heritage Museums: Co-constructing the Public Sphere?” Communication, Culture & Critique, 10(2): 280-301
- Noy, C. (2016). “Participatory Media New and Old: Semiotics and Affordances of Museum Media.” Critical Studies in Media Communication, 33(4): 308–323.
- Noy, C. (2016). “’My Holocaust Experience was Great!’”: Entitlements for Participation in Museum Media.” Discourse & Communication, 10(3): 274–290.
- Noy, C. (2015). “Writing in Museums: Towards a Rhetoric of Participation.” Written Communication, 32(2): 195–219.
- Hercbergs, D., and Noy, C. (2015). “Mobile Cartographies and Mobilized Ideologies: The Visual Management of Jerusalem.” Antipode, 47(4): 942–962.
- McIlvenny, P. and Noy, C. (2011). Co-edited Special Issue of Social Semiotics, 21(2), titled “Interdisciplinary Approaches to Spaces of Multimodal Discourse.”
- Noy, C. (2011). “’I Worship You - Israeli Soldiers’: Gender-cum-national Performances at an Israeli Commemoration Site.” Israel: Studies in Zionism and the State of Israel, 18-19: 211-236. [in Hebrew].
- Noy, C. (2009). “’I WAS HERE!’: Addressivity Structures and Inscribing Practices as Indexical Resources.” Discourse Studies, 11(4): 421-440.
- Noy, C. (2008). Mediation Materialized: The Semiotics of a Visitor Book at an Israel Commemoration Site. Critical Studies in Media Communication, 25(2): 175-195.
- Noy, C. (2007). “Sampling Knowledge: The Hermeneutics of Snowball Sampling in Qualitative Research.” International Journal of Social Research Methodology, 11(4), 327–344.
- Noy, C. (2004). “’The Trip Really Changed Me’”: Backpackers’ Narratives of Self-Change.” Annals of Tourism Research, 31(1): 78-102.
- Noy, C. (2003) “Narratives of Hegemonic Masculinity: Presentations of Body and Space in Israeli Backpackers’ Narratives.” Israeli Sociology, 5(1): 75-120. Special Issue on Masculinity. [in Hebrew]
- Noy, C. (2002). “‘You MUST go Trek There’: The Persuasive Genre of Narration among Israeli Backpackers.” Narrative Inquiry, 12(2): 261-290.

== Media ==
Prof. Noy’s research and opinions on media and tourism are featured on Israeli and international media organizations.

== Personal life ==
Noy is married to Orly. They have two daughters and live in Jerusalem. Noy is also an Aikido instructor (Sensei) (Dan 5), at the Jerusalem Aikido at Mt. Scopus Dojo.
