= Dov Noy =

Israeli folklorist (1920–2013)

- דב נוי
- Dov Noy
- Born: Dov Neuman; 20 October 1920; Kolomyia, Galicia, Poland
- Died: 29 September 2013 (aged 92); Jerusalem
- Occupation: Folklorist
- Known for: Founding the Israel Folktale Archives
- Spouse: Tamar Noy
- Children: Amos Noy; Izhar Noy; Chaim Noy
- Awards: Israel Prize (2004); Bialik Prize (2002)

Academic background
- Education: Hebrew University of Jerusalem (MA); Yale University; Indiana University Bloomington (PhD)
- Thesis: Motif-Index of Talmudic-Midrashic Literature (1954)
- Doctoral advisor: Stith Thompson

Dov Noy (Hebrew: דב נוי; 20 October 1920 – 29 September 2013) was an Israeli folklorist. He is considered one of the most important researchers in the field of Jewish folk tales.

== Early life and education ==
Dov Noy was born as Dov Neuman on 20 October 1920, in Kolomyia, Galicia (then Poland, now Ukraine). He got a traditional Jewish education and had a private tutor, Jewish poet Shimshon Meltzer. He emigrated to Palestine in 1938 and studied Talmud, Jewish history and the Bible at the Hebrew University of Jerusalem. He served as a volunteer for the British Army Royal Engineers from 1941 to 1945. Most of Noy's family were killed in the Holocaust, with the exception of himself and his brother Meir, who emigrated to Israel in 1948.

After the war, in 1946, Noy got his MA from the Hebrew University. He then worked as a teacher in British internment camps for Holocaust survivors in Cyprus in 1947–1949, where he met his brother Meir. From 1949 to 1952, he was part of the editorial team of a children's weekly magazine Davar Le'yeladim.

He studied in the United States from 1952 to 1954, first studying comparative literature under René Wellek at Yale University before moving to Indiana University Bloomington. There, he completed his doctoral dissertation under the supervision of folklorist Stith Thompson. Titled "Motif-Index of Talmudic-Midrashic Literature", Noy's dissertation analyzed motifs in rabbinic literature. This work was later included into Thompson's six-volume Motif-Index of Folk-Literature, "greatly raising the status of Jewish folklore in the field". Noy was the first folklorist who applied the Aarne-Thompson classification to Jewish folklore. Thompson called Noy "one of the most brilliant disciples I have ever had".

== Career ==
Upon returning to Israel in 1955, Noy began teaching at the Hebrew University of Jerusalem, focusing on aggadah. The same year, he founded the Israel Folktale Archives in Haifa, which would go on to collect more than 25,000 Jewish folktales from around the world. The archive was later renamed in Noy's honor. Noy collected and analysed folk tales of multiple Jewish communities, including Ashkenazi, Sephardi and Middle Eastern Jews. The collection of the Israel Folktale Archives have been published in English translation in the series Folktales of the Jews, edited by Noy's student Dan Ben-Amos.

To collect the folktales, Noy created "a network of narrative "collectors"" in Israel. In 1977, he started the "Beit She'an Project", a fieldwork study focused on the Moroccan Jewish community in Beit She'an. Noy called it "the second Jewish expedition" after S. An-sky's Jewish Ethnographic Expedition to Ukrainian shtetls in 1912-1914.

He also founded the Folklore Research Center at the Hebrew University and taught Jewish Folklore course there. Noy travelled a lot, giving lectures and attending conferences. In 1985–92, he was also the Professor of Yiddish Folklore at Bar-Ilan University.

== Recognition ==
In 2004, Noy was awarded the Israel Prize, the country's highest honor, for his folklore research. In 2002, he got the Bialik Prize. He was called "The Doyen of Jewish Folkloristics", and that he "single-handedly established the study of Jewish Folklore in Israel".

Noy died on 29 September 2013, in Jerusalem.

== Family and students ==
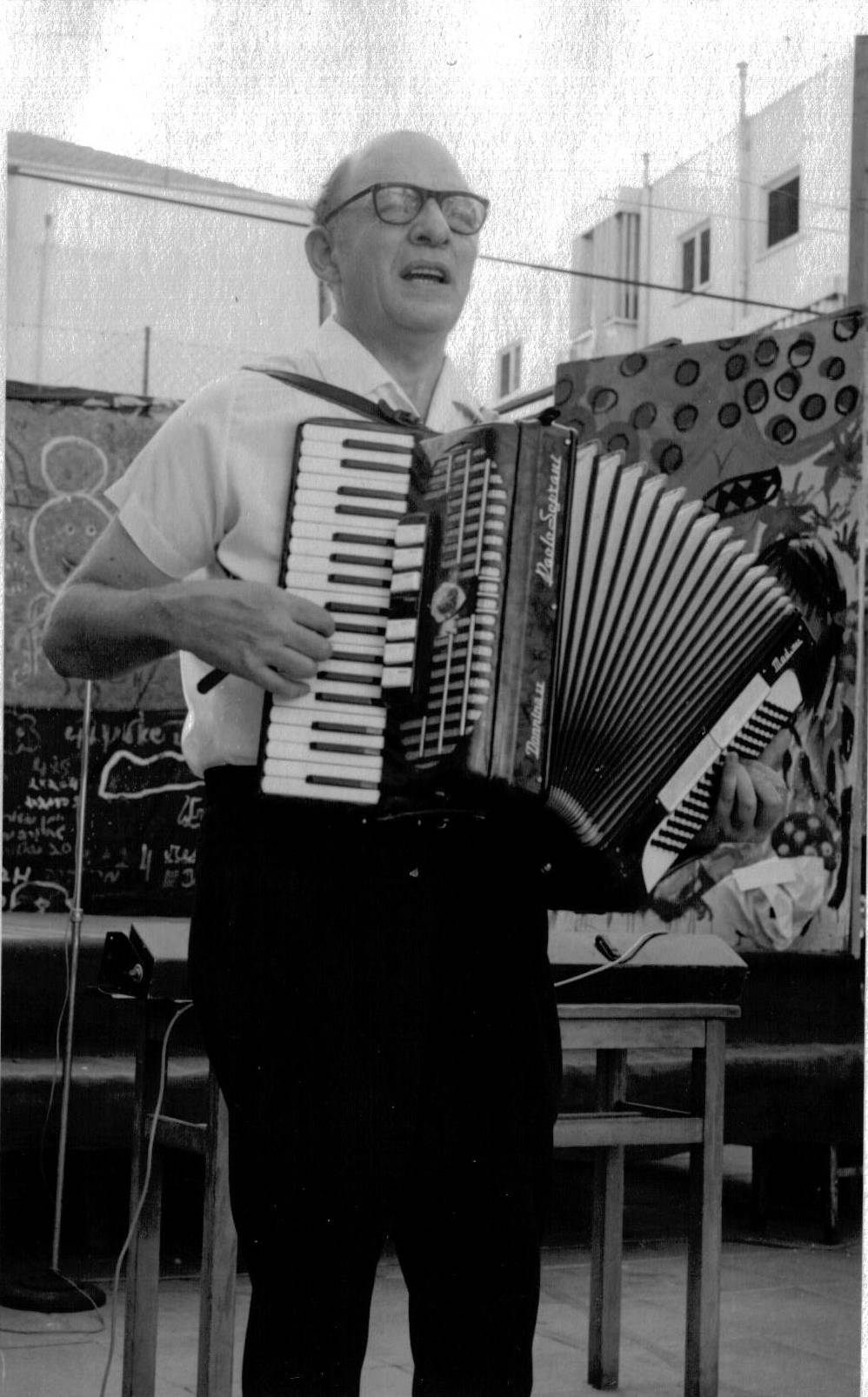
Meir Noy

Composer and ethnomusicologist Meir Noy (1922–1998), Dov Noy's brother, founded a music archive, the "Hebrew Song Collection", in Tel Aviv.

Noy was married to historian Tamar Noy; their son Chaim Noy is a media and communication professor. He was married before, and had two sons, poet Amos Noy and Izhar.

Among his students are Heda Jason, Dan Ben-Amos, Aliza Shenhar, Eli Yassif, Tamar Alexander, Haya Bar-Itzhak, and Galit Hasan-Rokem. Noy was known for his "astounding memory" and good sense of humor. Noy was fluent in English, Hebrew, Yiddish, Polish, Russian, and German.

== Publications ==
- Neuman (Noy), Dov (1954). Motif-Index of Talmudic-Midrashic Literature (PDF) (PhD). Indiana University.
- Noy, Dov (1961). "The First Thousand Folktales in the Israel Folktale Archives". Fabula. 4 (1): 99–110. doi:10.1515/fabl.1961.4.1.99.
- Noy, Dov (1963). Folktales of Israel. University of Chicago Press.
- Noy, Dov; Ben-Amos, Dan; Frankel, Ellen (2006). Folktales of the Jews, Volume 1: Tales from the Sephardic Dispersion. Jewish Publication Society. ISBN 978-0-8276-0829-0.
- Ben-Amos, Dan; Noy, Dov (2006). Folktales of the Jews, Volume 2: Tales from Eastern Europe. Jewish Publication Society. ISBN 978-0-8276-0830-6.
- Ben-Amos, Dan; Noy, Dov (2011). Folktales of the Jews, Volume 3: Tales from Arab Lands. Jewish Publication Society. ISBN 978-0-8276-0871-9.
- Flam, Gila; Noy, Dov (2018). Hobn Mir a Nigndl (We Have a Little Tune). The song of the Yiddish "Troubadour" Nokhem Shternheim. (a collection of Nachum Shternheim's works, which includes a short biographical notice.)
