= Rikle Glezer =

Polish-born Israeli World War II partisan and composer

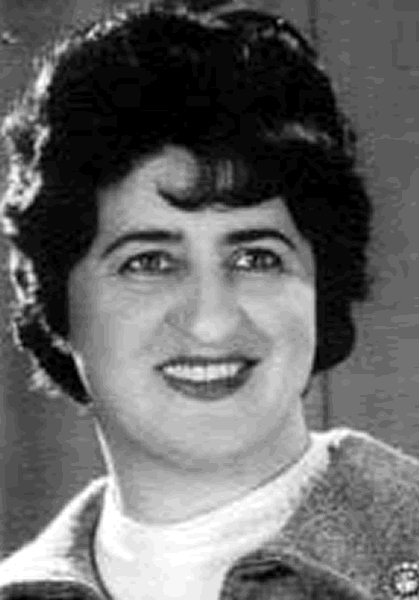
Rikle Glezer

Rikle (Ruth) Glezer-Kaplan (Yiddish: ריקלע גלעזער-קאַפּלאַן; December 17, 1924 - January 12, 2006) was a World War II partisan who composed popular songs about The Holocaust during the war.

== Early life ==
Glezer was born to a Jewish family in Vilnius (then Poland, now Lithuania) on December 17, 1924. The daughter of a jeweler, she studied in the Yiddish Sh. Frug School of the Central Education Committee and then in a Polish School. Glezer started writing poems at the age of 12, was active in school circles, and belonged to the SKIF, the Socialist Children's Association - a Bundist Children's organization. In 1941, when she was 16-years-old, Nazi Germany occupied the city, and deported Glezer and all other Jews to the Vilna Ghetto.

The Nazis took Glezer's father at the very beginning of the occupation. Glezer, her mother, and her younger sister lived until the liquidation of the ghetto in September 1943, and they were deported from the ghetto together. However, Glezer jumped out of the train when it was 15 kilometers from Vilnius and reached the forest where she became a Soviet partisan.

== Music ==
Glezer wrote several songs during her years of imprisonment in the ghetto. Most of her compositions were lyrics set to the melodies of popular songs: for example, her song "My Ghetto" was composed to the tune of the Russian song "My Moscow" ("Моя Москва") by the Soviet composer Isaak Dunayevsky. Rather than depicting Vilnius' beauty, however, Glezer’s lyrics tell of the grim reality of smuggling food under conditions of disease, exhaustion and starvation.

Glezer’s best-known song was the popular "S'iz geven a zumertog" ("It Was a Summer’s Day"). The song chronicles in painful detail how Jews were driven into the Vilna ghetto, their pleas for help, and the killings that were taking place both en route to the ghetto, and in the nearby forest of Ponar. The forest of Ponar was the site of the Ponary massacre, one of the most notorious sites of Nazi mass murder, where thousands of men, women and children from Vilnius and the surrounding towns were shot and buried in mass graves. The simple and evocative lyrics were set to the melody of a popular Yiddish theatre song of the inter-war years, ‘Papirosn’ (Cigarettes), composed by Herman Yablokoff. In 1999, the song was recorded and sung by Israeli singer Chava Alberstein under the name "Zumer Tag".

"It was a summer's day, sunny and lovely as always/And nature then had so much charm.

Birds sang, hopped around cheerfully. We were ordered to go into the ghetto.

Oh, just imagine what happened to us! We understood: everything was lost.

Of no use were our pleas that someone should save us/We still left our home.

The road stretched far; it was difficult to walk/I think that, looking at us, a stone would have cried.

Old people and children went like cattle to be sacrificed/Human blood flowed in the street." - It was a Summer's Day, 1941.

== Partisan activities ==
In 1941, when Glezer was 18, shortly after composing the song "It was a Summer's Day", Glezer was put on a train to be deported. Sources differ whether she was to be deported to Nazi camps or the forests of Ponar. Glezer managed to escape from the train and joined the Fareynikte Partizaner Organizatsye. She joined the Soviet partisans in the Rūdninkai forest south of Vilnius, as a fighter in the "Death to Fascism" regiment. The youngest member of the partisan group, Glezer continued to write between military actions.

She returned to Vilnius with the Soviet partisans and army units that occupied the city in July 1944.

== After World War II ==
Of Vilnius' 60,000 Jews in 1939, she was one of approximately 3,000 who survived to see the end of Nazi German occupation, when Vilnius was occupied by the Soviet Red Army.

In December 1948, she emigrated to Israel with her family, including her husband who was also a former partisan, on the ship Nagba.

In 1991, a book of her poems, "Leader von Life" (Leader of the Heart, 'Songs of Life') was published by Tarklin Publishing in Tel Aviv.

In 1996, Glezer, now going by her married name Kaplan, spoke about her experience to the Survivors of the Shoah Visual History Foundation.

== Known songs ==
Sources:

- "My Ghetto" Du Geto Mayn—דו געטאָ מײַן
  - Composer: Isaak Dunayevsky
- "It was a Summer's Day" Es Iz Geven A Zumertog—עס איז געװען אַ זומערטאָג
  - Composer: Yablakoff, Herman—יאַבלאַקאָף, הערמאַן
  - Set to melody of "Papirosn"
- “It is Gray and Dark in the Ghetto" Gro un fintster iz in geto
- “The Last Night" Di letste nakht
- “Jewish laughter" Der yidisher gelekhter
- “I’m free" Ikh bin fray

== Published works ==
- Leader of the Heart, Songs of Life. A book of poems. Tel Aviv: Lounge, 5791/1991.
