= Nachum Shternheim =

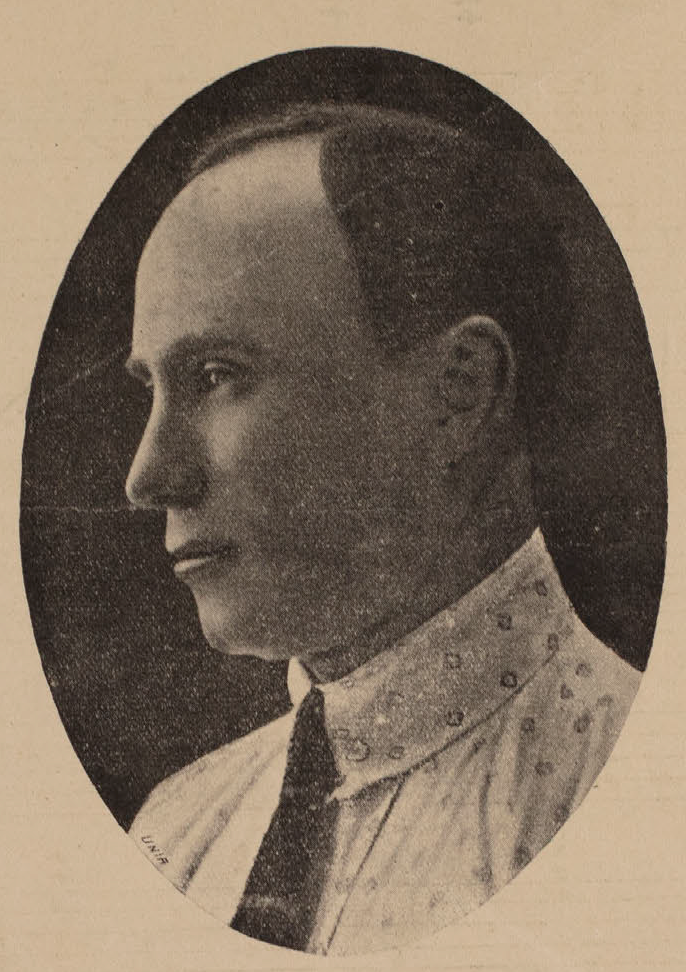
Nachum Sternheim, 1930

Nachum Shternheim or Nochem Sternheim (Yiddish: נחום שטרנהיים; December 7, 1876 - 1942) was Jewish poet, composer, and songwriter who wrote in Yiddish.

== Biography ==
Nachum Sternheim was born in Rzeszów, Austrian partition of Poland. to the family of Jehaj Natan Sternheim and Chaja née Bilder. Some sources claim the family was Hasidic, but there is no evidence that he was raised in Hasidic tradition. He became a Zionist and was an activist of Poale Zion in Rzeszów. In 1908 he moved to the United States and worked at a factory in New York. After some time he moved to the West Coast and started writing as a musician and composer in the emerging film industry. For unknown reasons, in 1912 he returned to Rzeszów. Upon return lectured on Jewish national poetry, wrote songs and performed in Jewish communities of Galicia. His first songs were published in the Wachenblatt newspaper, later by Goldberg printing house, Rzeszów.

The circumstances and even year of his death is uncertain: 1942 or 1943.

Gila Flam and Dov Noy published a collection of Shternheim's works, Hobn Mir a Nigndl (We Have a Little Tune). The song of the Yiddish „Troubadour” Nokhem Shternheim, which includes a short biographical notice.

== Known songs ==
- Onzer Nigundel (Yiddish: אונדזער ניגונדל "Our Little Nigun"); for a long time considered to be a folk song.
- Friday Night (פֿרײַטיק אױף דער נאַכט). It may be heard on the 1993 album Ałef-Bejs by Sława Przybylska
- Gila Flam found that Shternheim published two songs, "Dos Redl" (The wheel) and "Di Parodye Zum Redl" (Parody on the wheel), to the same tune as Papirosn (which was a contrafact itself).
- "Malkele" or "Tayere Malkele" (טײַערע מלכּהלע) ("Dear Malkele") (Malkele is a diminutive of Malka)
- "Legionen Marsch" (לעגיונען מארש)

== Family ==
Nachum had brother, Efraim, born on July 14, 1879, and a sister, Riwa, born on November 1, 1891. On March 21, 1926, Nachum Sternheim married Ernestyna née Rabb, and despite lack of children and him being over 20 years older than his wife, the marriage was successful.
