= Gila Flam =

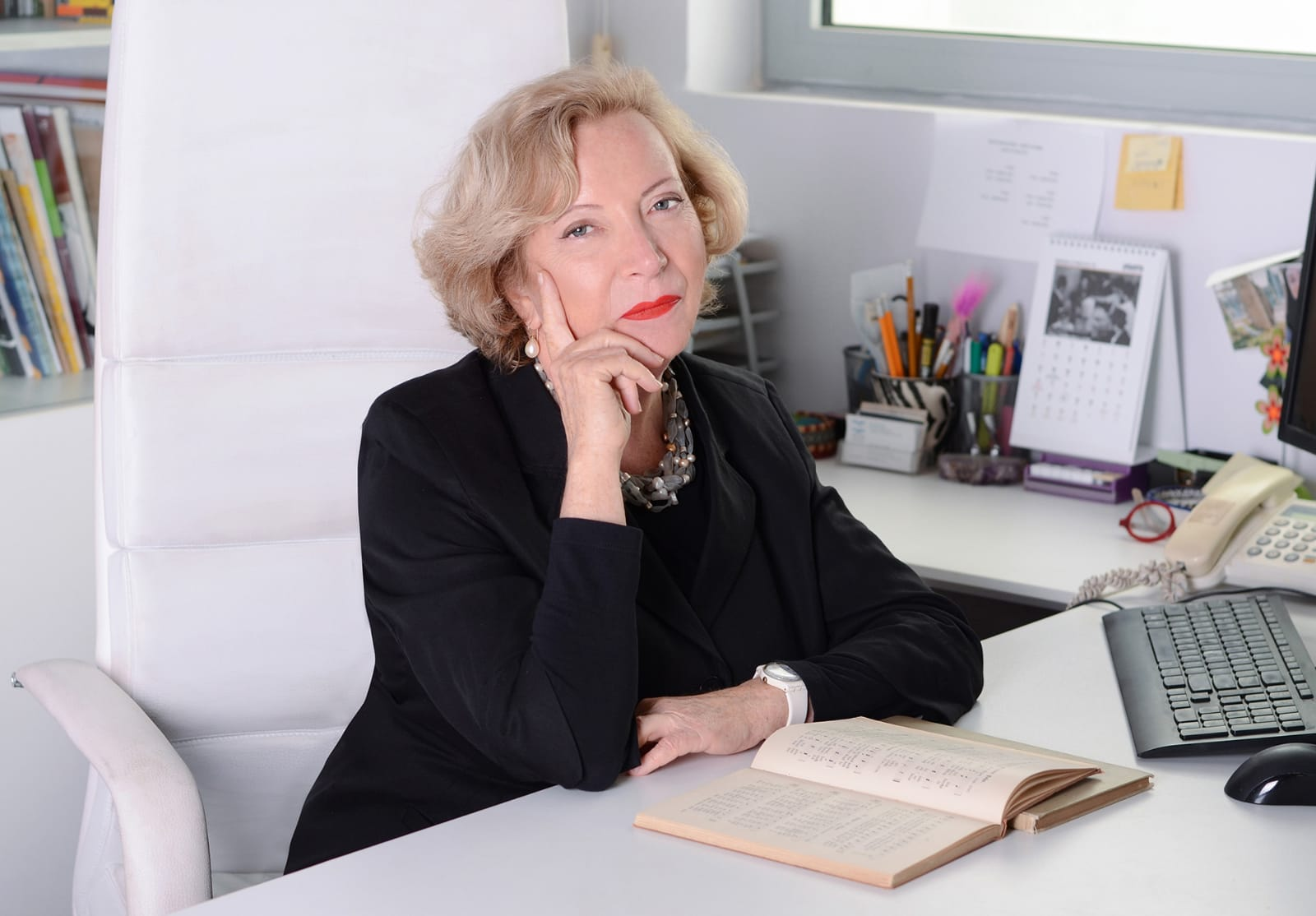
Gila Flam

Gila Flam (born 1956, Hebrew: גילה פלם) is an Israeli musicologist, ethnomusicologist, educator, and a librarian. Her reseatrch is focused on Jewish music, with an emphasis on the music of Eastern European Jews.

== Biography ==
Gila Flam was born in Haifa, Israel. She earned her Master's degree at the Hebrew University of Jerusalem, Department of Musicology, with the thesis "The Musical Activity of Bracha Zefira in the 1930s and 1940s in Palestine". Her Ph.D. thesis (1988, University of California, Los Angeles) was published as a book in 1992. In 1999 she also received a degree in Archival studies from the Hebrew University of Jerusalem.

Her work and positions include founder of the Ethnomusicology Archives and director of the ethnomusicology department at the US Holocaust Memorial Museum (from 1989 to 1992) and director of the music department and sound archive at the National Library of Israel (since 1994).

She has lectured at various conferences and taught classes on Yiddish song and music of the Holocaust at Tel Aviv University, the Hebrew University of Jerusalem, Bar-Ilan University, Levinsky College of Education, and the Jerusalem Academy of Music and Dance. She also performs songs she researches.

== Works ==
- 1992: Singing for Survival: Songs of the Lodz Ghetto, 1940-45
  The book is a pioneering work based on author's interviews with the survivors of the Łódź Ghetto and her research of library and archival materials.
- 2018: Gila Flam, Dov Noy, Hobn Mir a Nigndl (We Have a Little Tune). The song of the Yiddish „Troubadour” Nokhem Shternheim
  A collection of Nachum Shternheim's works, which includes a short biographical notice.

She also authored a number of articles on Israeli popular music and Yiddish song.
