= Alexander–Hirschowitz theorem =

The Alexander–Hirschowitz theorem shows that a specific collection of k double points in the projective space P^{r} will impose independent types of conditions on homogenous polynomials and the hypersurface of dimension d with many known lists of exceptions. In which case, the classic polynomial interpolation that is located in several variables can be generalized to points that have larger multiplicities.
