= Allen Hershkowitz =

American environmental scientist

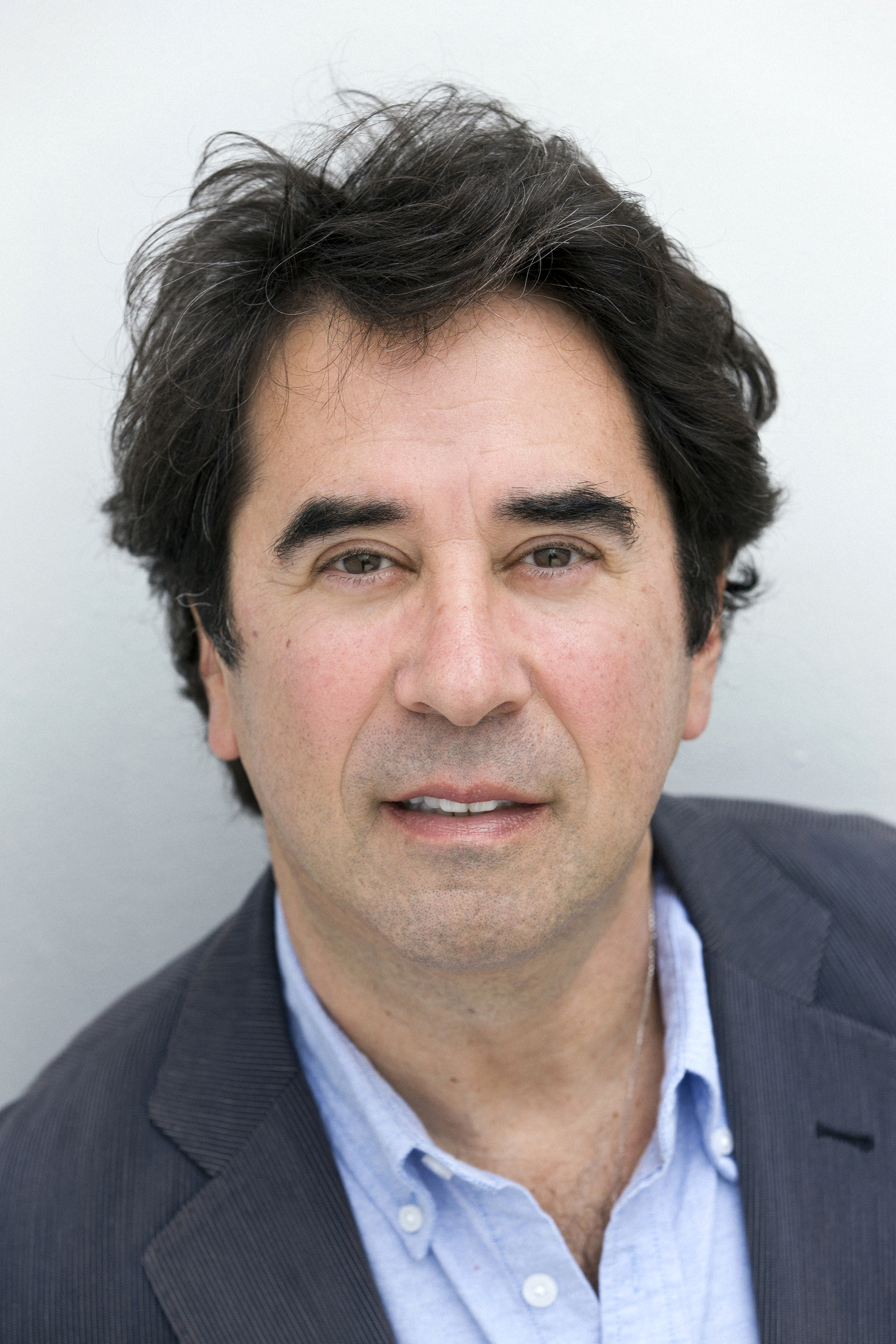
Allen Hershkowitz, 2013

Allen Hershkowitz is an American environmental scientist who worked as a senior scientist at Natural Resources Defense Council from 1988 to 2016, and at the Green Sports Alliance until 2017, when he left to become a Founding Director and Chairman of Sport and Sustainability International. Hershkowitz is currently Environmental Science Advisor to the New York Yankees, the first role of its kind in professional sports, as well as Environmental Advisor to the NBA, and Co-Chair of the WELL Health-Safety Rating for Facility Operations and Management of Sports and Entertainment Venues, created by the International WELL Building Institute (IWBI).

== Career ==
Hershkowitz started working at the Natural Resources Defense Council (NRDC) in 1988.

At an NRDC staff retreat in 2004, board member Robert Redford suggested that the NRDC establish more of a presence at professional sporting events; Hershkowitz told a reporter from Mother Jones: "We were trying to figure out how to reach out to untraditional allies, and Redford says to us, 'You know, if you want to meet Americans, you’ve got to go to a baseball game or a football game. You’ve got to go to one of these stadiums. That’s where America is.'" Hershkowitz met with Bud Selig of Major League Baseball (MLB) shortly after that, and soon the NRDC was creating white papers and teams to advise all the major sports leagues about environmental sustainability initiatives that addressed each sport's needs and could help them save money. Hershkowitz directed the Sports Greening Initiative at the NRDC.

In 2007, the Academy of Motion Picture Arts and Sciences approached the NRDC for advice about how to reduce the carbon footprint of the Oscar Awards show, after the academy was asked to do so by one of the producers of An Inconvenient Truth. Hershkowitz, in his role as a senior scientist at the NRDC, helped them from 2007 to 2011. Similarly, The Recording Academy asked the NRDC for help greening the Grammy Awards starting in 2008, and Hershkowitz led that effort as well.

In 2008, the United States Environmental Protection Agency (EPA) New England awarded the NRDC an Environmental Merit Award for its work with Major League Baseball (MLB). Under Hershkowitz's direction, NRDC developed a “Greening Advisor” for MLB to use and apply across the country.

Hershkowitz was dubbed "The Godfather of Greening" in a 2009 article by Yoga International writer Anna Dubrovsky.

In 2012, The NRDC Sports Greening Project, under Hershkowitz's leadership, won the Sport for the Environment Award from the organization Beyond Sport.

In 2014, Hershkowitz received the Rick Best Environmental Advocacy Award from the California Resource Recovery Association (CRRA), which, "honors lifetime environmental stewardship achievements and recognizes individuals who effectively advocate for Earth's natural systems. The award is for achievements that go beyond reuse, recycling and composting to encompass air and water quality, resource protection, and climate protection."

Hershkowitz was listed as the 50th most influential person in the field of sports business by Sports Business Journal in December 2015. By the time of the listing, he had provided environmental sustainability advice to the NBA, the NHL, MLB, Major League Soccer, and the U.S. Tennis Association that, according to the listing, had saved the leagues millions of dollars. In 2016, Worth Magazine listed Hershkowitz No. 48 in its article, "The 60 Most Powerful People in Sports."

In Episode 1 of GreenSportsPod, Host Lew Blaustein said that Hershkowitz was "singularly instrumental" in creating the environmental programs at MLB, the NBA, the NHL, and MLS.

The Green Sports Alliance got started in the late 2000s as informal discussions among management of the six major professional league sports teams in the Pacific Northwest, about how to improve their operations' sustainability. The idea of formalizing an alliance was generated in a meeting between Hershkowitz and representatives of sports teams owned by Paul Allen via Vulcan Inc., and GSA formally launched in the spring of 2011, with NRDC as one of the founding organizations. In 2016 Hershkowitz left the NRDC and became president of the GSA.

In December 2015, the GSA under Hershkowitz's leadership helped organize two summits on sports sustainability at the 2015 United Nations Climate Change Conference The participation of representatives from major American professional sports associations marked the first time the sports industry were directly involved with climate change initiatives by the United Nations.

In June 2016 Hershkowitz left the GSA to focus on more global issues. In December 2016 Sport and Sustainability International was formally launched; Hershkowitz was a member of its organizing committee, along with four other founding directors.

In a 2017 profile following the launch of Sport and Sustainability International, writer Lew Blaustein said about Hershkowitz, "Having created the greening programs at MLB, NBA, NHL, the USTA, and co-founded and served as President of the Green Sports Alliance, it is no exaggeration to say that Hershkowitz is the most consequential environmentalist in the history of North American sports. Hershkowitz is now globalizing his scope of influence as he helps develop Sustainability and Sports International (SandSI)."

On January 27, 2019, a Holocaust Remembrance Day public reading of Hershkowitz’s memoir “Finding My Father’s Auschwitz File” took place in NYC at the Sheen Center for Thought and Culture: https://www.youtube.com/watch?v=oXVo92EzTS0&t=14s&ab_channel=SheenTalks

In October 2019, Hershkowitz received the Green Shovel Award from The Center for Discovery at the 2019 Michael Ritchie Big Barn Event for a Sustainable Future. One month later, in November 2019, Hershkowitz received a Townsend Harris Medal from his alma mater, The City College of New York, which are awarded for "recognition of outstanding postgraduate achievement in their chosen fields."

In 2022, Dr. Hershkowitz was listed by Sports Business Journal among its list of “Executives To Know in Sports Sustainability.”

In a June 2024 column, Los Angeles Times Climate Columnist Sammy Roth wrote, "Hershkowitz has done more than anyone to clean up the sports business.”

In October 2024, Dr. Hershkowitz became the 1st recipient of the Sport Positive Regional Leader Award for North America.

In April 2026, Vert Media described Hershkowitz as "one of the most respected environmental scientists in the sports world.”

== Publications ==
- Hershkowitz, Allen (1986). Garbage burning : lessons from Europe: consensus and controversy in four European states. New York, N.Y.: INFORM. ISBN 978-0918780348.
- Hershkowitz, Allen; Salerni, Eugene (1987). Garbage management in Japan : leading the way. New York, NY: INFORM. ISBN 978-0918780430.
- Underwood, Joanna D.; Hershkowitz, Allen; Kadt, Maarten de (1988). Garbage : practices, problems & remedies. New York, N.Y.: INFORM. ISBN 9780918780478.
- Hershkowitz, Allen (1997). Too Good to Throw Away: Recycling's Proven Record. Natural Resources Defense Council, Incorporated. ISBN 9781893340138.
- National Research Council (1999). Waste Incineration and Public Health (Note: Hershkowitz was a member of the Committee on Health Effects of Waste Incineration that produced this). National Academies Press. ISBN 9780309063715.
- Hershkowitz, Allen (2002). Bronx ecology : Blueprint for a new environmentalism. Washington: Island Press. ISBN 978-1559638647.
- Hershkowitz, Allen (2011). "Life is God's Masterpiece". In J. Henry Fair (ed.). The Day After Tomorrow: Images of Our Earth in Crisis. PowerHouse Books. ISBN 9781576875605.
- Hershkowitz, Allen (23 February 2015). "Selig's legacy as environmental advocate is unmatched". SportsBusinessJournal. Leaders Group.
- Hershkowitz, Allen (29 June 2015). "How sports can shift attitudes toward global sustainability". SportsBusinessJournal. Leaders Group.
- Hershkowitz, Allen (12 December 2016). "Sports and sustainability: Tracking progress in 2016". SportsBusinessJournal. Leaders Group.
- Hershkowitz, Allen (13 February 2017). "Concessionaires seeing environmental value in menu options". SportsBusinessJournal. Leaders Group.
- Hershkowitz, Allen (20 March 2017). "Sustainability leadership in sports is needed more than ever". SportsBusinessJournal. Leaders Group.
- Hershkowitz, Allen (17 April 2017). "NBA's new campaign seeks to shift environmental behavior". SportsBusinessJournal. Leaders Group.
- Hershkowitz, Allen (29 May 2017). "Sports sustainability Congress in Paris a historic gathering". SportsBusinessJournal. Leaders Group.
- Hershkowitz, Allen (26 June 2017). "Sustainability essentials: Measure, reduce and offset". SportsBusinessJournal. Leaders Group.
- Hershkowitz, Allen (7 August 2017). "Essentials of sustainability in sports: Protecting biodiversity". SportsBusinessJournal. Leaders Group.
- Hershkowitz, Allen (28 August 2017). "Guest Blog: Allen Hershkowitz on Ten Years of Sustainability at the US Open". GreenSportsBlog.
- Hershkowitz, Allen (9 October 2017). "Social, ecological progress through sport as necessary as ever". SportsBusinessJournal. Leaders Group.
- Hershkowitz, Allen (18 December 2017). "Sports and sustainability in 2017: Women leading the way". SportsBusinessJournal. Leaders Group.
- Hershkowitz, Allen (12 November 2018). "Hockey Hall of Fame gains environmental steward in Bettman". SportsBusinessJournal. Leaders Group.
- Hershkowitz, Allen (2019). Finding My Father's Auschwitz File. New York, N.Y.: Shakespeare & Co. ISBN 9781948582704.
- Hershkowitz, Allen. "Making climate history: From the New York Yankees to Roland Garros". The Sustainability Report.
- Hershkowitz, Allen. "David Stern: A tribute to a green sports champion". The Sustainability Report.
- Behar, Doug, Hershkowitz, Allen (25 February 2021). "Yankee Stadium, Other Sports Venues Can Be Arenas To Defeat The Pandemic". Sportico-The Business of Sports. PMC.
