= Bučje, Pleternica =

Bučje
- Village
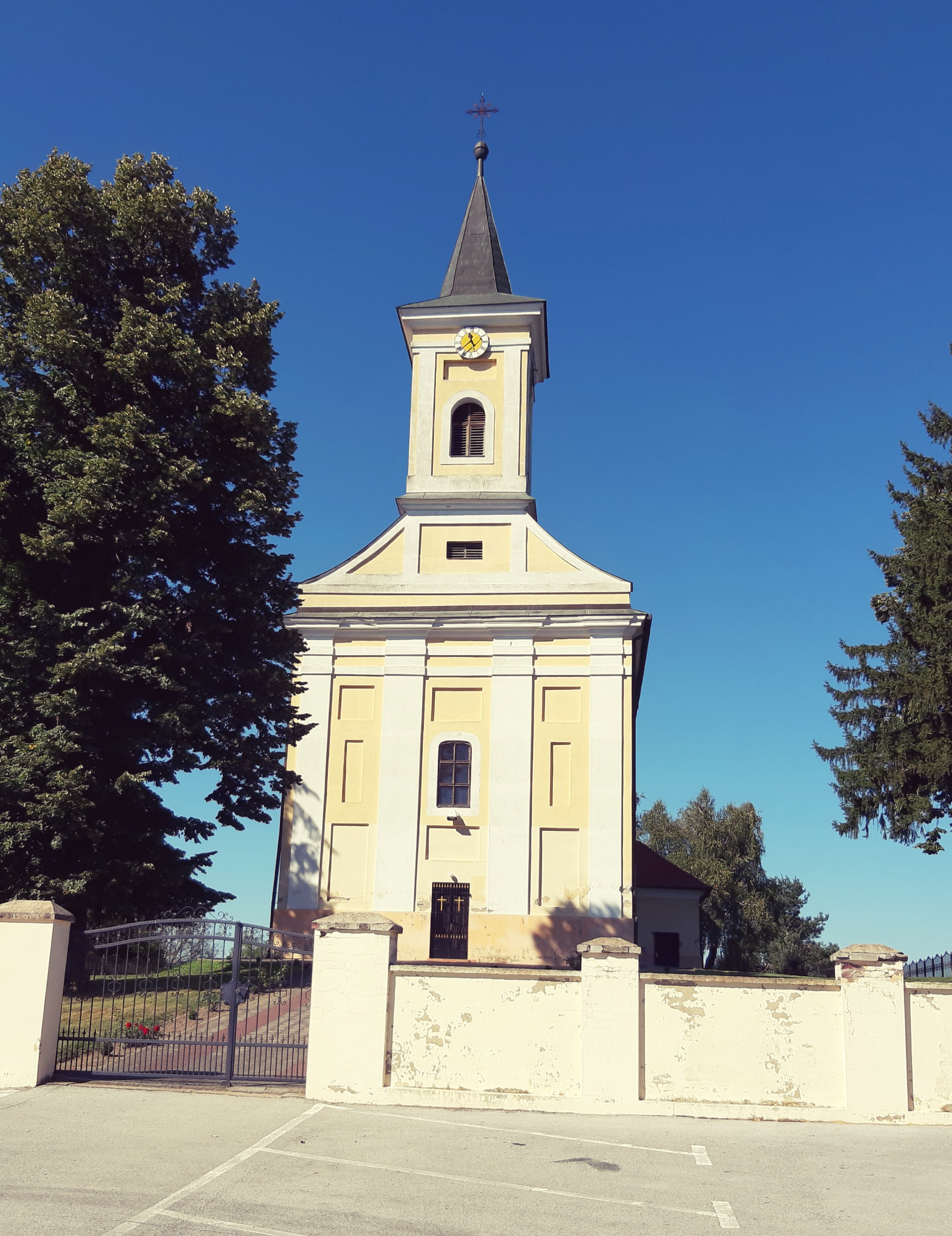
- Church in area

- Location within Croatia
- Coordinates: 45°13′51″N 17°46′58″E
- Country: Croatia
- Region: Slavonia
- County: Požega-Slavonia County
- City: Pleternica

Area
  - Total: 9.9 km^{2} (3.8 sq mi)
- Elevation: 135 m (443 ft)

Population (2021)
  - Total: 253
  - Density: 26/km^{2} (66/sq mi)
- Time zone: UTC+1 (CET)
  - Summer (DST): UTC+2 (CEST)
- Postal code: 34310
- Area code: 034

Bučje is a village in Požega-Slavonia County, Croatia. The village is administered as a part of the City of Pleternica. According to national census of 2011, population of the village is 318. The village is connected by the D38 state road.

== Notable people ==
- Leon Geršković - lawyer, legal scholar and politician
