= Zeev Hershkowitz =

Israeli footballer

Zeev Hershkowitz זאב הרשקוביץ
Personal information
- Full name: Zeev "Zevik" Hershkowitz
- Place of birth: Jaffa, Israel

Senior career*
Years	Team	Apps	(Gls)
- Maccabi Jaffa
1957–1963	Maccabi Netanya	75	(13)
- * Club domestic league appearances and goals

Zeev Hershkowitz (Hebrew: זאב הרשקוביץ) is a former Israeli footballer who played in Maccabi Jaffa and Maccabi Netanya in the 1950s and 1960s.
