= Moti Herskowitz =

- מוטי הרשקוביץ
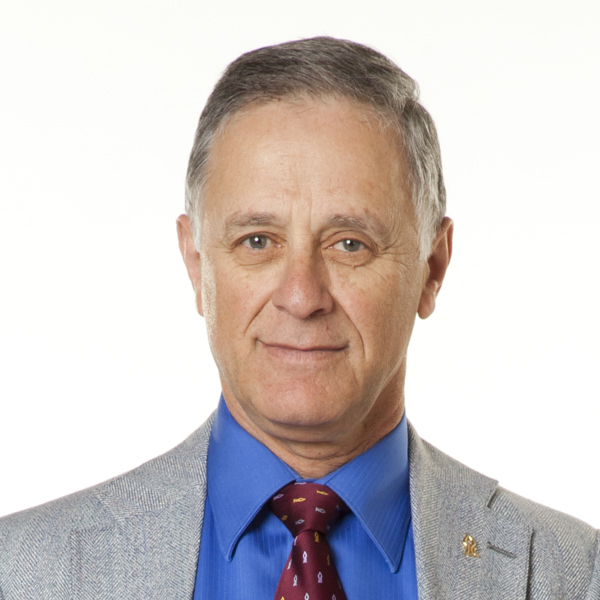
- Scientific career
- Fields: Engineering
- Institutions: Ben-Gurion University of the Negev
- Doctoral advisors: Ruben G. Carbonell and J. M. Smith
- Website: in.bgu.ac.il/en/indcat/Pages/default.aspx

Moti Herskowitz (Hebrew: מוטי הרשקוביץ) is a professor of Chemical Engineering, the incumbent of the Israel Cohen Chair in Chemical Engineering and researcher in the fields of advanced materials, catalysis and multiphase reactors. He is the founder (1995) and director of the Blechner Center for Industrial Catalysis and Process Development.

== Career ==
Herskowitz joined the Department of Chemical Engineering at BGU in 1979 as lecturer and was promoted to Full Professor in 1992. He served as the chairman of the Department of Chemical Engineering (1989-1993) and the vice-president and Dean for Research and Development (2003-2014). He also served as the director of the Ilse Katz Institute for Nanoscale Science & Technology (2009-2010) and as acting director of the National Institute of Biotechnology in the Negev (2015-2016). Herskowitz has consulted and collaborated with multi-national and national companies in a wide range of innovative projects, which resulted in commercial applications and joint patents and publications.

== Research ==
Herskowitz focused, early in his career, on multiphase reactors research with specific contributions in the area of trickle-bed reactors. The emphasis then shifted to advanced catalytic materials and catalytic processes, combining fundamental research with applications that resulted in various discoveries and inventions. With the establishment of the Blechner Center, most of the research was focused on environmental catalysis, including wastewater and polluted air treatment and the production of renewable and fungible liquid fuels by eco-friendly catalytic processes. The research was funded by national and international foundations, including the Israel Science Foundation, FP5 and Horizon 2020 programs of the European Community, Israel-Strategic Alternative Energy Foundation, Israel Ministry of Science and Technology, Israel Ministry of Energy as well as significant funding from industry. The research findings were published in scientific papers and patents. Some of the discoveries and inventions that were published in the media included the development of on-vehicle hydrogen fuel system, aroma fine chemicals, production of advanced, green diesel fuel from vegetable oils and animal fats and carbon dioxide hydrogenation to renewable liquid fuels.
