= Yankele Hershkowitz =

Polish street singer

Yankele Hershkowitz was a street singer during the Holocaust in the Łódź Ghetto.
