= Jacques Gershkovitch =

Russian conductor and musician

- Born: 1884; Irkutsk, Siberia, Russian Empire
- Died: 1953 (aged 68–69); Portland, Oregon, U.S.
- Occupations: Conductor; musician
- Known for: First conductor of the Portland Youth Philharmonic
- Spouse: Lucia Gershkovitch (m. 1918)

Jacques Gershkovitch (Russian: Жак Гершкович; 1884–1953) was a Russian conductor and musician who became the first music director of the Portland Junior Symphony (now known as the Portland Youth Philharmonic), the first youth orchestra in the United States, based in Portland, Oregon. Born to a musical family in Irkutsk, Gershkovitch was sent to Saint Petersburg in his late teens to study at the Imperial Conservatory. In 1913, he graduated with honors in flute and conducting, and was awarded the Schubert Scholarship for a year of study under German conductor Arthur Nikisch in Berlin. Gershkovitch returned to Irkutsk to enlist during World War I, and by 1916 he had become head of the Imperial Russian Army's military symphony orchestra. He held this position through the Russian Revolution and thereafter, as concerts were often presented as benefits for orphans and the Red Cross.

Gershkovitch married in Irkutsk in 1918. There, he established a fine arts conservatory and symphony orchestra which continued under the Bolshevik regime. In 1921, he and his wife crossed the border in China to escape from Russia. Ballerina Anna Pavlova offered Gershkovitch the assistant conductor position with her orchestra, which was touring throughout Asia. Gershkovitch remained in Japan to lead the newly organized Tokyo Symphony Orchestra. However, the 1923 Great Kantō earthquake disrupted the organization and caused Gershkovitch and his wife to emigrate to the United States. The couple arrived in San Francisco in November 1923 and made their way to Portland in 1924. There, Gershovitch was approached to lead the Portland Junior Symphony. Known for his discipline and high performance standards, Gershkovitch conducted the orchestra for twenty-nine years, gaining national attention for the ensemble and pioneering the youth orchestra movement until his death in 1953.

== Early life and education ==
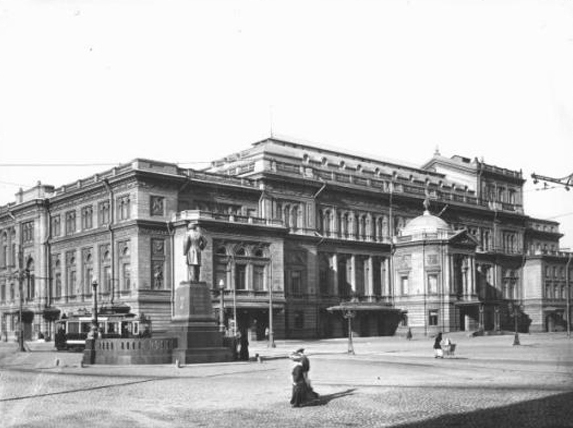
The Saint Petersburg Conservatory in 1913, the year Gershkovitch graduated from the renowned institution

Jacques Gershkovitch was born in 1884 to a Jewish family in Irkutsk near Lake Baikal in Siberia, Russia. His father, an amateur violinist "who made up in enthusiasm what he lacked in skill", and mother had seven children, six of whom became professional conductors or singers. Chamber music was a common activity in the household.

Gershkovitch was sent to Saint Petersburg in his late teens to study at the Imperial Conservatory. The 4,000-mile (6,400 km) journey took two weeks via the newly constructed Trans-Siberian Railway, and Gershkovitch arrived with "17 rubles in his pocket and his flute under his arm". He auditioned and was awarded a scholarship. There he learned from respected Russian composers such as Alexander Glazunov, Nikolai Rimsky-Korsakov and Nikolai Tcherepnin, and completed coursework in opera and ballet production. To pay his own expenses, and to assist in paying the expenses of two of his siblings who were also studying at the Conservatory, Gershkovitch performed with bands and orchestras. This delayed his undergraduate work, but in 1913 he graduated with the title of "laureate" (the conservatory's highest honor) with honors in flute and conducting, and was awarded the Schubert Scholarship for a year of study under German conductor Arthur Nikisch in Berlin. However, this period was shortened due to World War I, and Gershkovitch returned to Irkutsk to enlist.

== Early career ==
In 1916, Gershkovitch became head of the Imperial Russian Army's military symphony orchestra, a position he held through the Russian Revolution. Army duties continued after the war as concerts were often given as benefits for orphans and the Red Cross, and it was during this period that Gershkovitch met his future wife Lucia. Then an engineer working on a construction project near Khabarovsk, she had previously been a piano student at the Conservatory during the same period Gershkovitch was there. The two met in 1917, and in 1918 they married in Irkutsk. In Irkutsk, he organized a fine arts conservatory and symphony orchestra. The institute was successful, and by 1920 enrollment had reached more than 1,550 students. Following a successful takeover of the city by the Bolsheviks, Gershkovitch conducted bands for funeral services under the new regime. During a service rehearsal, Gershkovitch removed a man causing numerous interruptions. As a result, Gershkovitch was commanded to visit the Cheka, the presiding chief of which was the victim of the previous day's incident. However, the chief was a devotee of music and requested that Gershkovitch produce a grand opera. He provided a collection of musical instruments previously confiscated by the Bolsheviks. Gershkovitch's conservatory, orchestra, and newly established opera continued under the Bolshevik regime.

== Relocation ==
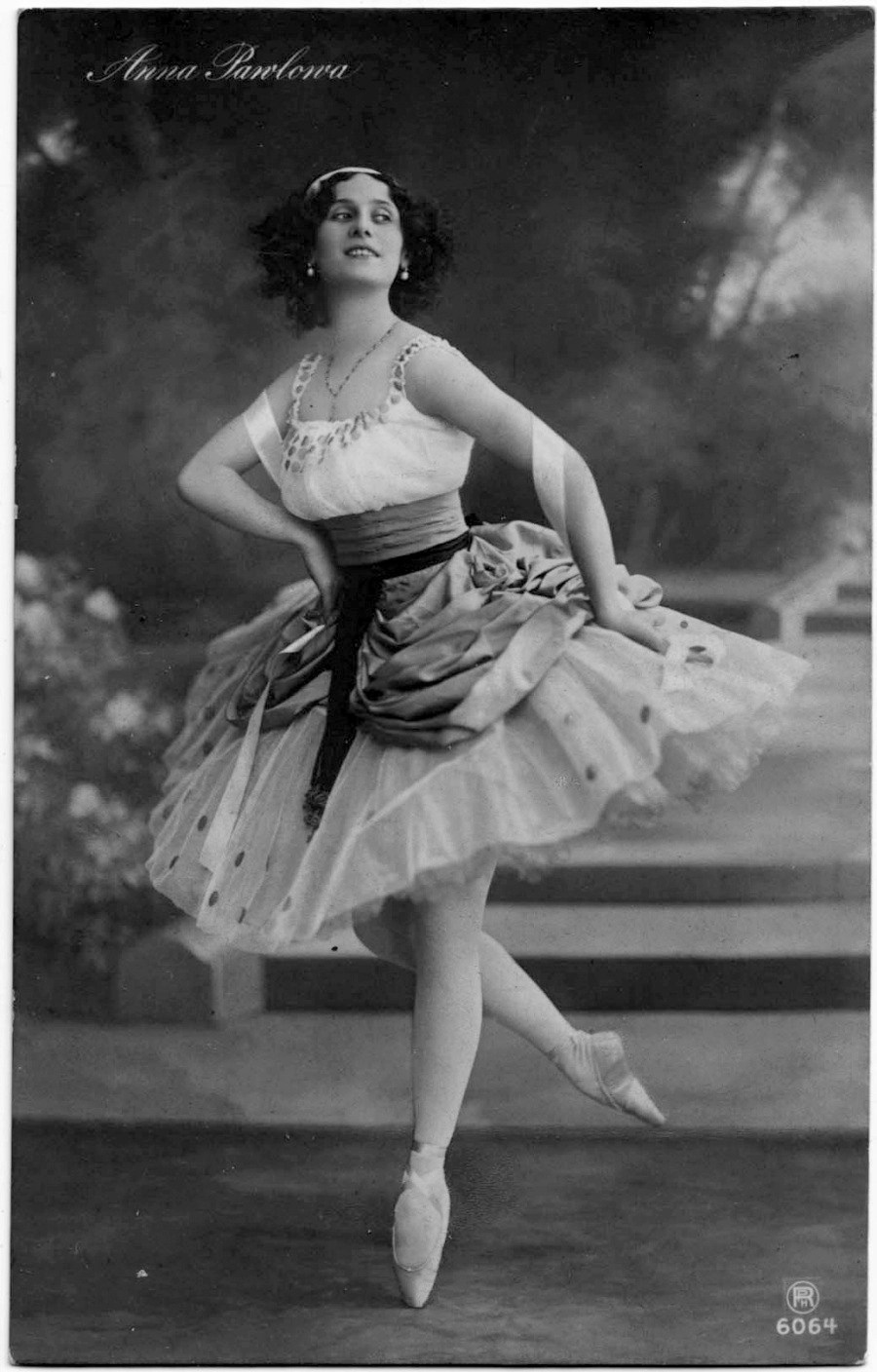
Anna Pavlova (pictured in 1912) offered Gershkovitch a position as assistant conductor with her orchestra.

When living conditions deteriorated, Gershkovitch traveled to China and obtained permission to visit Vladivostok via Manchuria. After crossing the border to China in 1921, he remained in Harbin, where he met Lucia, who had also escaped from Russia. Together they made their way to Tientsin, where they met and became close friends with composer Aaron Avshalomov. When ballerina Anna Pavlova heard that Gershkovitch had escaped from Russia, she offered him a position as assistant conductor with her orchestra, which was touring throughout Asia. Following three months of touring, Gershkovitch settled in Tokyo to undertake the newly organized Tokyo Symphony Orchestra under the patronage of Baron Okura, a wealthy nobleman and relative of the Mikado.

The orchestra's premiere concert took place at the Imperial Hotel auditorium; many concerts followed and were well received until the Great Kantō earthquake of 1923 "disorganized all the business and musical interests of the city". Gershkovitch and his wife, guests at Baron Okura's home, endured the earthquake for six days before leaving for Kobe. With assistance from Americans, the Norwegian consul, and financial aid from Baron Okura, the couple left for San Francisco, arriving in November 1923. Following the advice of San Francisco Symphony conductor Alfred Hertz, Gershkovitch and his wife made their way to Portland, Oregon, in 1924. It was here that Gershkovitch was approached by Mary Dodge and two of her students to lead the Portland Junior Symphony (PJS). He taught flute and conducted the Ellison-White Conservatory's student orchestra, at the time directed by Jacob Avshalomov, until the PJS duties required his full attention.

== Portland Youth Philharmonic ==
To command attention, maintain discipline, and secure the maximum results he resorted to sarcasm, praise, ridicule, humor, flattery, scolding, dirty looks and the highest commendation—all in a quaint and very special brand of English. The children loved it, for it always had an element of the unexpected.

— Jacob Avshalomov, later the orchestra's conductor and music director, on Gershkovitch's style

Under Gershkovitch's leadership, the Portland Junior Symphony (now known as the Portland Youth Philharmonic) was founded in late 1924 as the first youth orchestra in the United States. The symphony performed for the first time on February 14, 1925, at the Lincoln High School Auditorium (which later became Portland State University's Lincoln Hall), playing Schubert's Unfinished Symphony. Gershkovitch allegedly introduced the composition and stated "You play, or I keel [sic] you" in his heavy accent at the ensemble's first rehearsal. Concert attendees reportedly surged the stage after the concert to congratulate the musicians, Gershkovitch and Dodge, who was present and called to the stage. One reviewer for the Oregon Sunday Journal wrote the following day that the "audience that almost filled the auditorium to capacity broke into storm upon storm of applause". According to Ronald Russell, author of A New West to Explore (1938), the audience "had experienced a new emotional thrill, and forthwith became strong advocates and supporters of the junior symphony cause".

Gershkovitch, known for his discipline and high performance standards, conducted the orchestra for twenty-nine years, gaining national attention for the ensemble and pioneering the youth orchestra movement. By the 1930s, PJS concerts were broadcast nationally on the CBS Radio Network. In 1956 and 1958 both NBC and CBS transmitted broadcasts of the orchestra's programs across the United States, and three transcribed programs were broadcast overseas from Voice of America in Washington, D.C. Gershkovitch was also responsible for adding a Preparatory Orchestra (later renamed the Conservatory Orchestra) due to increased membership. He tried to incorporate at least one American composition in each concert. Gershkovitch had a distinctive personality and a unique way with words, using expressions such as "More nicely, can't you more?" and "Debussy is beauty, French beauty" (as recollected in one former student's diary). For twenty-five years, David Campbell served as Master of Ceremonies for the Children's Concerts since Gershkovitch "never gained a command of English sufficient enough for public use". Gershkovitch's often-quoted philosophy was that he did "not teach music", but rather he taught "young people through music". Though there were times he desired to conduct professional ensembles, Gershkovitch's primary concern was educating the youth. Apart from music education, he stressed the importance of proper conduct, manners, and "values in life and art" in order to build character. Following Gershkovitch's death in 1953, guest conductors led the orchestra for its thirtieth season – one conductor was Jacob Avshalomov, a Columbia University teacher and PJS alumnus who had studied under Gershkovitch while a student at Reed College (1939–1941).

== See also ==
- List of Jews born in the former Russian Empire
- Military history of the Russian Empire
- Music education for young children
- Music education in the United States
- Music of Russia
