= Łukasz Hirszowicz =

Polish historian

Łukasz Hirszowicz (1920–1993) was a Polish historian, associate professor of the Institute of History, and expert on Middle East and Jewish issues in central and eastern Europe.

Hirszowicz was born in Grodno and left "just before the war" to study at the Hebrew University of Jerusalem. He studied physics and Arabic as well as history. When he returned to Poland in 1948, he went to work at the Polish Institute of International Affairs, Szkoła Główna Służby Zagraniczne, which is the Main School of Foreign Service. He earned his doctorate at the Institute of History PAN and began working there in 1954.

== Personal ==
His wife Maria was a sociologist.

== Selected publications ==
- Iran 1951-1953: nafta, imperializm, nacjonalizm, Warszawa: Książka i Wiedza 1958.
- III Rzesza i arabski Wschód, Warszawa: Książka i Wiedza 1963 (The Third Reich and the Arab East, London: Routledge and Kegan Paul - Toronto: University of Toronto Press 1966).
- Problematyka współczesnego Egiptu: stenogram wykładu wygłoszonego w Stołecznym Ośrodku Propagandy Partyjnej, Warszawa: Wydział Propagandy i Agitacji KW PZPR 1963.
- Kořeny antisemitismu a politika : případ Polska : polská židovská komunita po druhé světové válce [w:] Antisemitismus v posttotalitní Evropě: sborník z Mezinárodního semináře o antisemitismu v posttotalitní Evropě, který uspořádala Společnost Franze Kafky 22.-24. května 1992 v Praze pod záštitou Václava Havla, odp. red. Hana Bílková a Jan Hančil, Praha: Nakl. Centrum Franze Kafky Praha 1993.
