= Kim Hirschovits =

Finnish ice hockey player

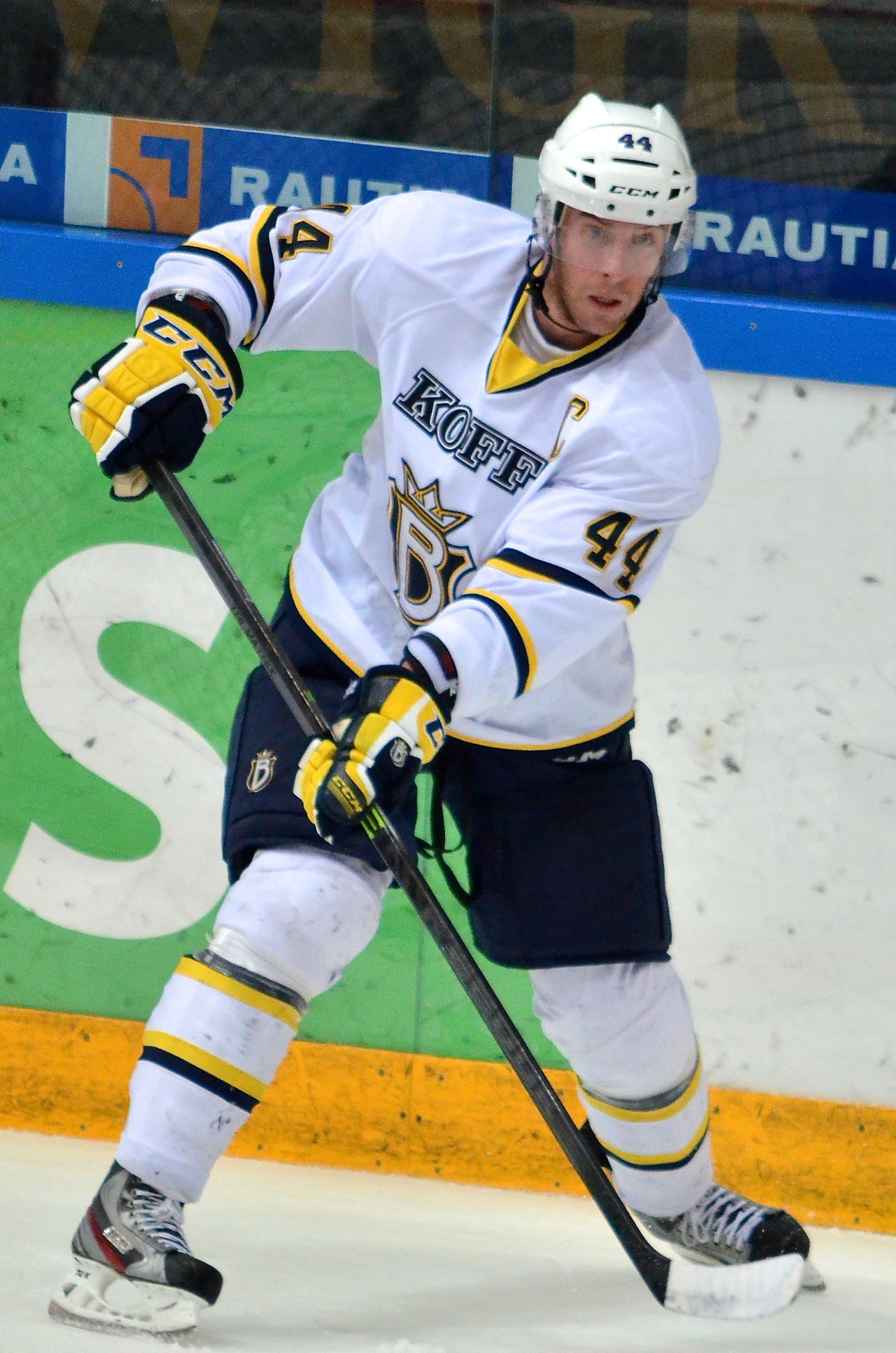
- Hirschovits with the Espoo Blues in 2013
- Born: 9 May 1982 (age 43) Helsinki, Finland
- Height: 6 ft 1 in (185 cm)
- Weight: 196 lb (89 kg; 14 st 0 lb)
- Position: Centre
- Shot: Left
- Played for: HIFK; Jokerit; Timrå IK; Torpedo Nizhny Novgorod; Luleå HF; HC Dinamo Minsk; Espoo Blues; Oulun Kärpät; Espoo United; Kiekko-Espoo
- Coached for: Kiekko-Espoo
- National team: Finland
- NHL draft: 194th overall, 2002; New York Rangers
- Playing career: 2001–2019
- Coaching career: 2019–present

Kim Michael Hirschovits-Gerz (born 9 May 1982) is a Finnish former professional ice hockey forward and current sports manager of Kiekko-Espoo in the Liiga. During his playing career, he skated in the Finnish Liiga (called SM-liiga until 2013) with HIFK, Jokerit, the Espoo Blues, and Oulun Kärpät; in the Swedish Elitserien with Timrå IK and Luleå HF; and in the Kontinental Hockey League (KHL) with Torpedo Nizhny Novgorod and Dinamo Minsk. Hirschovits was drafted by the New York Rangers as their sixth-round pick, 194th overall, in the 2002 NHL entry draft.

Following his retirement in 2019, Hirschovits stepped into the role of sports manager at Kiekko-Espoo. He also served as the team's head coach during the 2019–20 season and 2021–22 season.

== Playing career ==
Hirschovits started his professional playing career with HIFK in the 2000–01 SM-liiga season, but his career took off in the 2005–06 season, when he scored 40 points. Hirschovits then created controversy by signing with HIFK's local rival Jokerit, following in the footsteps of coach Doug Shedden. Hirschovits's career included a brief visit to North America in 2002, when he played six games with the Chicago Steel of the United States Hockey League (USHL).

In September 2006, he was the SM-liiga Player of the Month. In the 2008–09 season he led the SM-liiga in assists (48) and points (Veli-Pekka Ketola Trophy; 66) and was the January 2009 SM-liiga Player of the Month. In the 2014–15 season, he was named the Liiga Best Player of the regular season (Lasse Oksanen Trophy), won the Liiga Golden Helmet, led the Liiga in assists (45) and points (Veli-Pekka Ketola Trophy; 58), and was the February 2015 Liiga Player of the Month.

== International play ==
Hirschovits made his international debut on Team Finland on the Euro Hockey Tour's Moscow tournament in December 2006.

== Career statistics ==
=== Regular season and playoffs ===
			Regular season					Playoffs
Season	Team	League	GP	G	A	Pts	PIM	GP	G	A	Pts	PIM
1998–99	HIFK	FIN U18	31	19	11	30	22	3	2	0	2	2
1999–00	HIFK	FIN U18	6	6	3	9	6	3	0	5	5	2
1999–00	HIFK	Jr. A	40	10	10	20	45	3	0	1	1	0
2000–01	HIFK	Jr. A	35	24	20	44	41	9	6	6	12	6
2000–01	HIFK	SM-l	2	0	0	0	0	—	—	—	—	—
2001–02	HIFK	Jr. A	5	4	7	11	8	4	3	6	9	0
2001–02	HIFK	SM-l	45	6	10	16	24	—	—	—	—	—
2001–02	KJT	Mestis	3	1	2	3	6	—	—	—	—	—
2001–02	Chicago Steel	USHL	6	2	2	4	6	—	—	—	—	—
2002–03	HIFK	SM-l	55	4	11	15	26	4	0	0	0	0
2003–04	HIFK	SM-l	56	7	12	19	56	13	1	3	4	8
2004–05	HIFK	SM-l	55	8	13	21	61	5	0	1	1	16
2005–06	HIFK	SM-l	53	14	26	40	69	12	4	1	5	16
2006–07	Jokerit	SM-l	54	19	40	59	62	10	2	3	5	14
2007–08	Jokerit	SM-l	54	17	24	41	99	7	0	2	2	10
2008–09	HIFK	SM-l	58	18	48	66	54	2	0	0	0	12
2009–10	HIFK	SM-l	54	18	26	44	62	6	3	6	9	10
2010–11	Timrå IK	SEL	52	12	21	33	52	—	—	—	—	—
2011–12	HIFK	SM-l	30	3	4	7	30	—	—	—	—	—
2011–12	Torpedo Nizhny Novgorod	KHL	12	2	3	5	4	12	2	3	5	6
2012–13	Luleå HF	SEL	39	7	9	16	28	—	—	—	—	—
2012–13	Dinamo Minsk	KHL	3	0	3	3	2	—	—	—	—	—
2013–14	Blues	Liiga	60	9	22	31	62	7	0	0	0	2
2014–15	Blues	Liiga	59	13	45	58	46	4	0	2	2	4
2015–16	Blues	Liiga	25	3	10	13	18	—	—	—	—	—
2015–16	Kärpät	Liiga	29	2	11	13	22	7	0	0	0	2
2016–17	Espoo United	Mestis	3	0	1	1	2	—	—	—	—	—
2017–18	Espoo United	Mestis	29	2	19	21	28	—	—	—	—	—
2018–19	Kiekko–Espoo	FIN.3	11	3	5	8	6	3	0	0	0	4
SM-l/Liiga totals			689	141	302	443	691	77	10	18	28	94

=== International ===
Year	Team	Event	Result	GP	G	A	Pts	PIM
2002	Finland	WJC	3rd place, bronze medalist(s)	7	0	1	1	6
Junior totals				7	0	1	1	6

== Records ==
- Recorded six assists in an SM-liiga game (January 9, 2007), a Jokerit club record. The league record, seven assists, dates back to 1982 and is held by Matti Forss.

== See also ==
- List of select Jewish ice hockey players
