= Philip Herschkowitz =

Romanian-born Soviet music theorist, teacher, and composer (1906–1989)

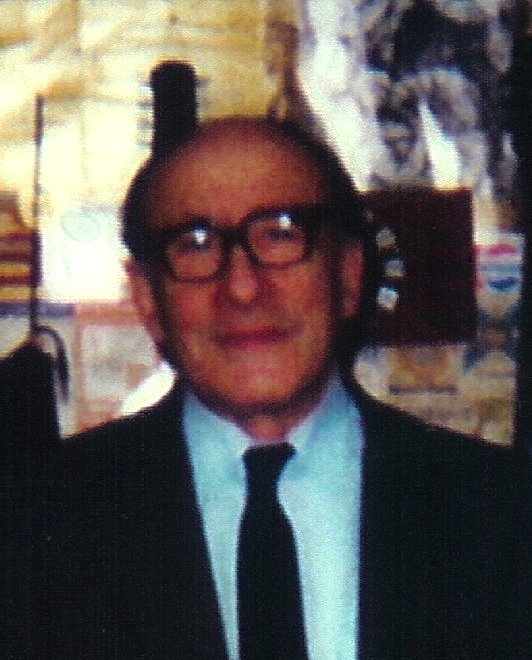
- Philip Herschkowitz

Background information
- Born: 7 September 1906; Iași, Romania
- Died: 5 January 1989 (aged 82) Vienna, Austria
- Occupations: composer and music theorist

Philip Herschkowitz (Romanian: Filip Herșcovici; Russian: Филипп Гершкович, Filipp Gershkovich) (7 September 1906 – 5 January 1989) was a Romanian-born composer and music theorist, pupil of Alban Berg and Anton Webern, who spent 47 years, from 1940 to 1987, in the Soviet Union.

== Biography ==
Born to a Jewish family in Iaşi, he graduated from the conservatory in the city in 1927 and entered the Music Academy in Vienna, Austria, where he studied with Joseph Marx. Then he studied privately with Berg (1928–1931), and with Webern (1934–1939). He left Nazi German-occupied Austria and arrived in the Soviet Union in 1940, settling first in Chernovtsy, which he left on 22 June 1941 at the beginning of the German invasion, and then moving to Tashkent (in the Uzbek SSR) where he lived until 1944.

He settled in Moscow in 1946, where we began to teach privately, exerting a major influence on several generations of Russian musicians, including leading figures of the so-called "Underground division". Among these were the composers Andrei Volkonsky, Edison Denisov, Alfred Schnittke, Sofia Gubaidulina, Nikolai Karetnikov, Boris Tishchenko, Valentin Silvestrov, Leonid Hrabovsky, Vyacheslav Artyomov, Vladimir Dashkevich, Alexander Voustin, Vladislav Shoot, Viktor Suslin, Dmitri Smirnov, Elena Firsova, Leonid Hoffman, Vladislav Soyfer; the musicologists Mikhail Druskin, Natan Fishman, Yuri Kholopov, and many others. See: List of music students by teacher: G to J#Philip Herschkowitz.

Herschkowitz was one of the most important pupils of Webern, and devoted his life to the understanding and development of his teacher's ideas. He was interested in exploring and creating a theoretical foundation to Webern's musical thought. He focussed on the analysis of the music of the great masters and in particular on Beethoven. The essence of this approach lies in the exploration of musical material in terms of the opposition between two fundamental categories: Fest ("fixed") and Locker ("floating").

By the invitation of the Alban-Berg-Stiftung, he returned to Vienna in 1987 — he died there two years later. The four volumes of his book On music that contain the essence of his teaching were edited and published by his widow Lena Herschkowitz and Klaus Linder in Moscow in 1991–1997.

== Works ==
- 1929 Waltz for piano (planned as part of a larger composition)
- 1930 Die Tulpen (Tulips). Melodrama after Peter Altenberg (project)
- 1930 Fugue for 14 solo instruments (flute, oboe, clarinet, bass clarinet, bassoon, alto saxophone, horn, trumpet, harp, percussion, violin, viola, cello, double bass and piano (planned as part of a larger composition)
- 1932 Wie des Mondes Abbild zittert (Heinrich Heine) for voice and piano
- 1947 Vesennie tsvety (Spring Flowers) for piano
- 1950s Capriccio, 2 pF. ‘Sovetsky Kompozitor’, Moscow, 1957
- 1960s Drei Klavierstücke (Three Piano Pieces)
- 1960s Fünf Klavierstücke (Five Piano Pieces)
- 1962 Vier Lieder (Four Songs, Paul Celan) for mezzo-soprano and piano
- 1965–6 3 lieduri (Three Songs, Ion Barbu) for voice and piano
- 1960s Brandmal (Paul Celan) for voice and piano
- 1968 Vier Stücke (Four Pieces) for cello and piano
- 1969 Klavierstück (Piano Piece) in 4 movements
- 1971 Brandmal (Paul Celan) for mezzo-soprano, flute, 2 clarinets, piano in 4 hands, percussion, 6 violas and double bass
- early 1970s Espenbaum (Paul Celan) for mezzo-soprano, flute, 2 clarinets, percussion, piano in 4 hands, 6 violas and double bass
- early 1970s Leuchten (Paul Celan) for mezzo-soprano, 2 flutes, 2 clarinets, bass clarinet, 2 bassoons, 4 horns, piano, 4 violins, 2 violas and 2 celli
- early 1970s Vier Lieder (Four Songs, Paul Celan) for mezzo-soprano, 2 flutes, 2 clarinets, bass clarinet, 2 bassoons, 4 horns, small drum, piano, 4 violins, 2 violas and 2 celli
- 1970s Drei Stücke (Three Pieces) for cello and piano
- 1970s Malaya kamernaya syuita (A Small Chamber Suite) for 2 clarinets, violin, viola, cello and piano
- 1979 Malaya kamernaya syuita (A Small Chamber Suite) for mezzo-soprano, 2 clarinets, violin, 2 violas, cello and
- 1983 Madrigaly (Madrigals) setting the poems of Rainer Maria Rilke, Federico García Lorca and Guillaume Apollinaire
- 1980s Beethoven's String Quartet in F Major (Hess 34) after his Ninth Piano Sonata (Op.14/1), arranged for string orchestra.
- 1987-8 Drei Gesänge mit Begleitung eines Kammerensembles (Three Songs with Chamber-Ensemble Accompaniment)
