= Annette Herscovics =

Scientist at McGill University

- Born: 1938; Paris, France
- Died: September 6, 2008 (aged 69–70); Montreal, Canada
- Education: McGill University
- Children: Philippe Herscovics
- Awards: Fellow of the Royal Society of Canada
- Scientific career
- Fields: Glycobiology
- Workplaces: Harvard Medical School; McGill University

Annette Herscovics (1938–2008) was a scientist at McGill University, a Fellow of the Royal Society of Canada, and a pioneer in the field of glycobiology.

== Personal life ==
Herscovics was born in Paris, France, the daughter of Polish Jews. She survived the Holocaust as a hidden child in Nazi-occupied France. After immigrating to Canada, she obtained a PhD in biochemistry at McGill University in Montreal in 1963.

Herscovics died of cancer on September 6, 2008.

== Career ==
Herscovics worked in the Department of Anatomy at McGill from 1967–1971, during which she made several important discoveries in glycobiology. She discovered in 1969 that thyroglobulin undergoes carbohydrate modifications, part of a class of proteins known as glycoproteins.

After completing her post-doctoral work at McGill, Herscovics moved to Harvard Medical School in 1971, where she remained until 1981. During this time she published more than 20 original papers in her field.

In 1981, Herscovics returned to McGill University as an associate professor in the McGill Cancer Centre. She was appointed a professor in the Departments of Medicine and Biochemistry in 1987, and a professor in the Department of Oncology in 1992. During this time she made several other important discoveries, including how the carbohydrate modifications are relevant to disease, including cancer.

Herscovics was elected as a Fellow of the Royal Society of Canada in 1998. She has published 110 peer-reviewed papers during her academic career.

== Published works ==
- Herscovics, Annette, and Peter Orlean. "Glycoprotein biosynthesis in yeast." The FASEB Journal 7.6 (1993): 540-550.
- Hosokawa, Nobuko, et al. "A novel ER α-mannosidase-like protein accelerates ER-associated degradation." EMBO Reports 2.5 (2001): 415-422.
- Moremen, Kelley, Robert B. Trimble, and Annetté Herscovics. "Glycosidases of the asparagine-linked oligosaccharide processing pathway." Glycobiology 4.2 (1994): 113-125.
- Herscovics, Annette. "Importance of glycosidases in mammalian glycoprotein biosynthesis." Biochimica et Biophysica Acta (BBA) - General Subjects 1473.1 (1999): 96-107.
- Whur, P., Annette Herscovics, and C. P. Leblond. "Radioautographic visualization of the incorporation of galactose-3H and mannose-3H by rat thyroids in vitro in relation to the stages of thyroglobulin synthesis." The Journal of cell biology 43.2 (1969): 289-311.
- Herscovics, Annette. "Processing glycosidases of Saccharomyces cerevisiae." Biochimica et Biophysica Acta (BBA) - General Subjects 1426.2 (1999): 275-285.
