= Leon Geršković =

Croatian lawyer & politician (1910–1992)

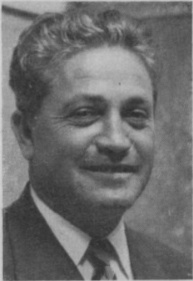
- Geršković in 1958

Personal details
- Born: 2 February 1910 Bučje, Pleternica, Austro-Hungarian Empire (now Bučje, Croatia)
- Died: 1 June 1992 (aged 82) Zagreb, Croatia
- Education: University of Zagreb

Leon Geršković (2 February 1910 – 1 June 1992) was a Croatian-Jewish lawyer, legal scholar, newspaper editor, professor, and politician.

== Biography ==
Geršković was born in Bučje, Pleternica on 2 February 1910. He attended the Faculty of Law at the University of Zagreb and graduated in 1933. From 1935, he was a member of the Communist Party of Yugoslavia. Geršković was an active member of the syndicate at the textile factory "Hermann Pollack & Sohn" in Zagreb. After graduation, Geršković worked as a lawyer, when in 1940 he opened his own private law office. Geršković joined the Partisans in 1941. In 1943, he became the first editor of Slobodna Dalmacija. From 1944, Geršković was the chief of administration at State Anti-Fascist Council for the National Liberation of Croatia (ZAVNOH). He was a recipient of the Commemorative Medal of the Partisans of 1941. Repeatedly, he was the elected member of the SFR Yugoslavia National Assembly, state secretary at the federal executive council, and member of the Parliament of the Socialist Republic of Croatia. He was a university professor who taught constitutional law and the municipal system. Geršković was one of the founders of Faculty of Political Science at the University of Zagreb in 1962, and its first dean until 1965. Also, he was a professor at the University of Belgrade Faculty of Law. Geršković started the journal Politička Misao ("Political Thought"). Between 1946 and 1974, Geršković participated in the writing of the constitution of Yugoslavia. He died on 1 June 1992 in Zagreb and was buried at the Mirogoj Cemetery.

== Works ==
- Documents on the Development of the National Government (Croatian: Dokumenti o razvoju narodne vlasti, 1946)
- The History of the National Government (Croatian: Historija narodne vlasti, 1950)
- The Science of Administration (Croatian: Nauka o administraciji, 1951)
- Social Management in Yugoslavia (Croatian: Društveno upravljanje u Jugoslaviji, 1957)
- Basics of the Legal System in Joint Work (Croatian: Polazne osnove pravnog sistema u udruženom radu, 1972)
- Constitutional Themes (Croatian: Ustavne teme, 1976)
- The Socialist Community of Labor (Croatian: Socijalistička zajednica rada, 1976)

== Bibliography ==
- Goldstein, Ivo (2005). Židovi u Zagrebu 1918 - 1941. Zagreb: Novi Liber. ISBN 953-6045-23-0.
- Kovačec, August (2002). Hrvatska opća enciklopedija 4. Zagreb: Leksikografski Zavod Miroslav Krleža. ISBN 953-6036-34-7.
- Ivanc, Emil (1985). Črnomerec u narodnooslobodilačkoj borbi. Zagreb: ITRO August Cesarec, OOUR izdavačka djelatnost.
- Romano, Jaša (1980). Jevreji Jugoslavije 1941-1945: žrtve genocida i učesnici narodnooslobodilačkog rata. Beograd: Jevrejski Istorijski Muzej, Saveza jevrejskih opština Jugoslavije.
