= Alexandre Herchcovitch =

Brazilian fashion designer (born 1971)

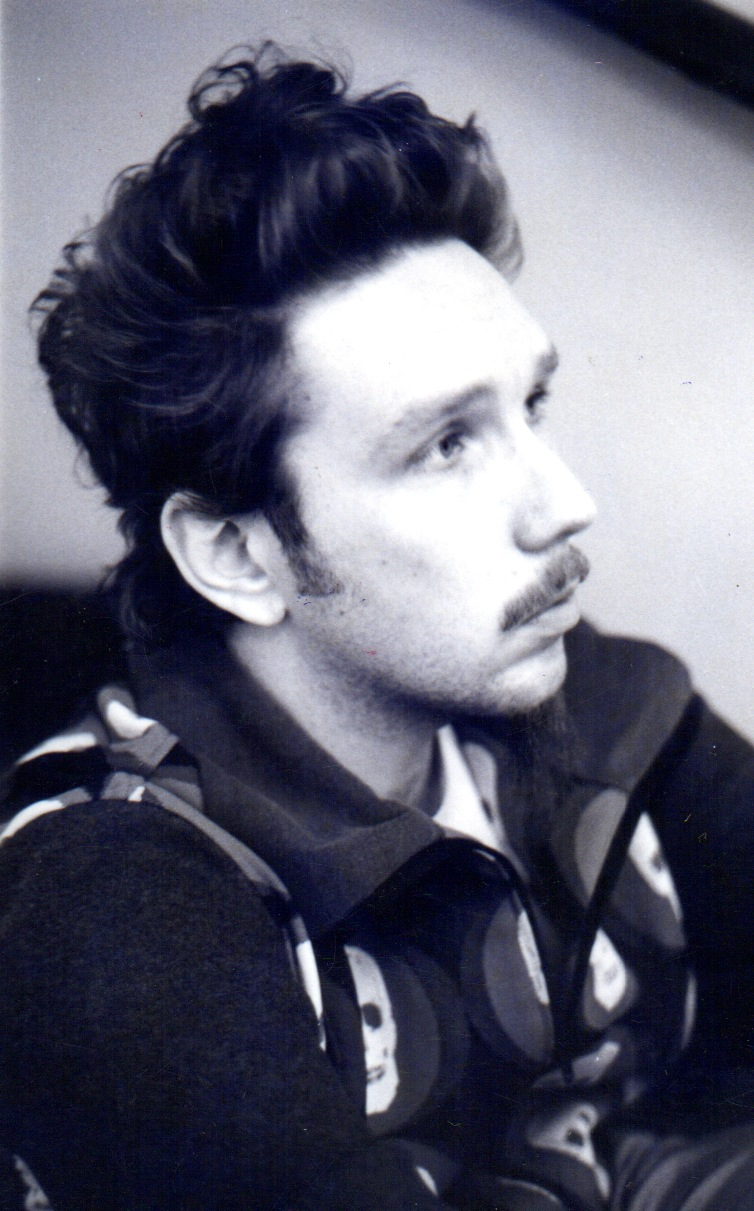
Herchcovitch in 2015

Alexandre Herchcovitch (Brazilian Portuguese pronunciation: [aleˈʃɐ̃dɾi ʁeʁʃkoˈvitʃi]; born 21 July 1971) is a Brazilian fashion designer. His designs have been at fashion shows in New York, Paris, London and São Paulo Fashion Weeks. Best known for avant-garde designs and eclectic prints, his trademark skulls became an icon of Brazilian youth in the 1990s.

== Early life ==
Herchcovitch was born in São Paulo, Brazil. He is of Jewish descent, with his grandparents having immigrated to Brazil from Poland and Romania. He had his first contact with fashion through his mother, Regina, at the age of 10, when she gave him basic lessons of modelling and sewing at Herchcovitch's request. Regina started to wear the clothes he made in parties, which led him to sell his collections to friends. In his teens, Herchcovitch went to the alternative clubs of São Paulo nightlife, but at the same time he studied at an Orthodox Jewish school, a conflict that had a strong influence over his work afterwards.

== Products ==
Selected products of his are sold in the United States, Canada, England, France, Spain and Australia. His first store in Tokyo has recently opened. Herchcovitch chose Tokyo because that is where a good part of his collections are purchased and where he has become somewhat of a fashion guru. The 1,076 sq ft (100.0 m^{2}) store, which sits in the hip Daikanyama district, carries his men's, women's and denim collections and is operated in partnership with Japanese fashion distributor and retailer H.P. France.

== Honors ==
In 2014, Herchcovitch became the first Brazilian fashion designer to receive the Ordem do Mérito Cultural.

In 2024, Herchcovitch made a fashion exposition at the Jewish Museum of São Paulo.
