= Mikhail Girshovich =

- Михаил Гиршович
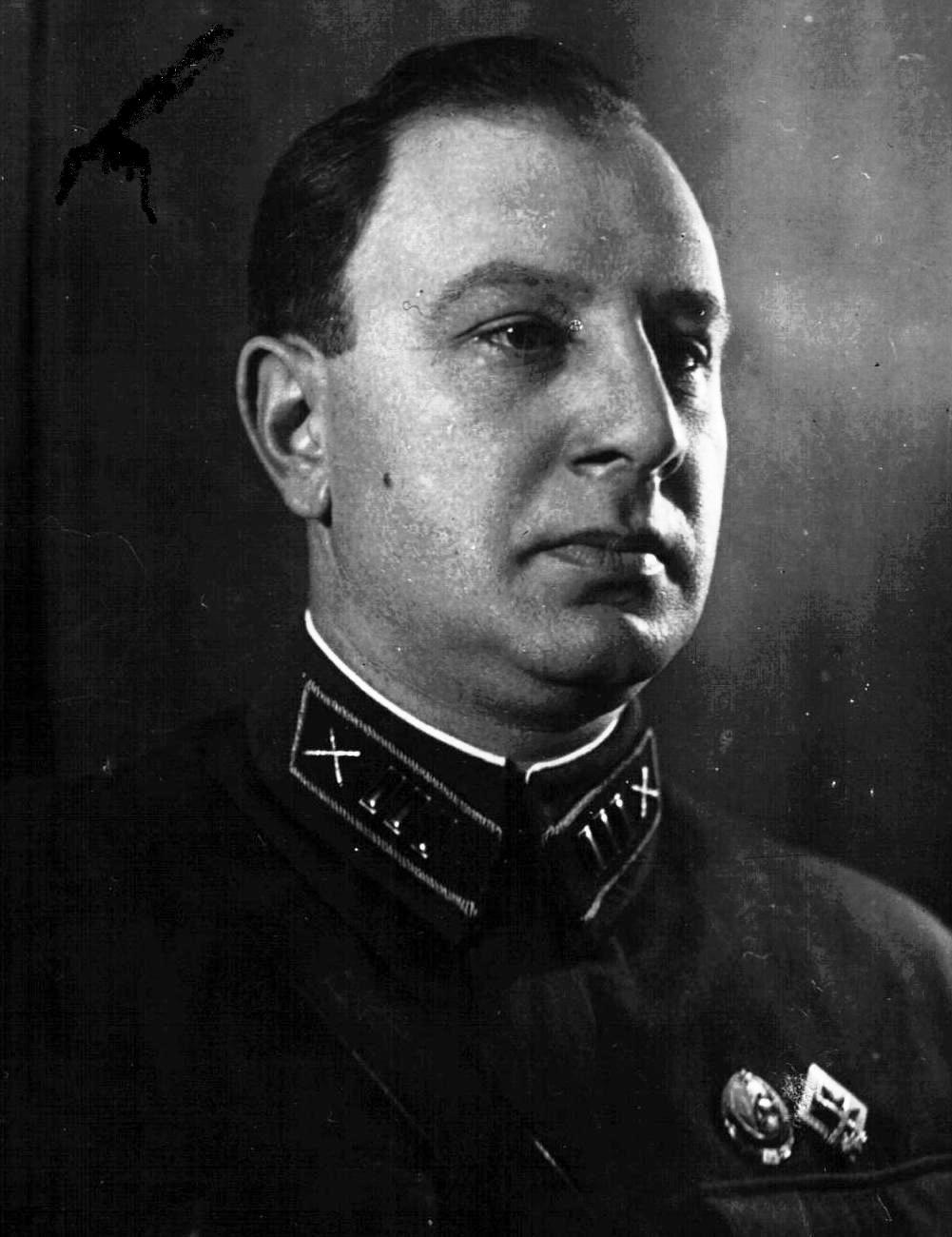
- Girshovich in 1941
- Born: Mikhail Grigoryevich Girshovich; April 18, 1904; Kutno, Russian Empire (now Poland)
- Died: July 26, 1947 (aged 43); Khabarovsk, Russian SFSR, Soviet Union (now Russia)
- Military career
- Allegiance: Soviet Union
- Branch: Red Army
- Service years: 1920–1947
- Rank: Major general (from 18 November 1944 onward)
- Conflicts: Russian Civil War; World War II
- Awards: Order of the Red Banner; Order of Lenin; Order of Kutuzov

Mikhail Grigoryevich Girshovich (Russian: Михаи́л Григо́рьевич Гиршо́вич; April 18, 1904 – July 26, 1947) was a major general in the Red Army.

== Early life and education ==
Girshovich was born into a Jewish family of officials in Russian-occupied Poland. He finished 4 classes of Jewish schooling and moved to Belorussia.

== Career ==
=== Red Army ===
Girshovich joined the Soviet Red Army in 1920. In 1926, he graduated Moscow artillery school and in 1938 graduated the anti-aircraft artillery course.

=== World War II ===
- Deputy commander of Army Air Defense.

Girshovich was head of Moscow Anti-aircraft warfare from 1942 to 1943.

Girshovich was the head of the Red Army Anti-aircraft warfare from 1944 to 1945.

He became the head of the Amur PVO Army, Deputy Far East PVO Commander in 1946 and died in 1947 serving in that capacity.
