= Mikhail Makarenko =

Soviet dissident (1931–2007)

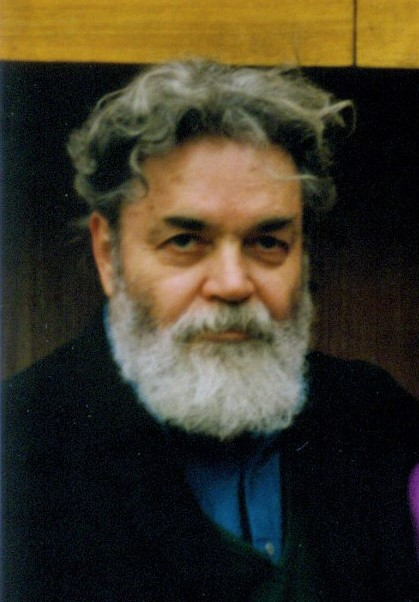
Makarenko M.Y. 1992 year in St-Petersburg

Mikhail Yanovitch Makarenko (1931 – 15 March 2007), né Moishe Hershkovich, also Gershkovich, also spelled as Michail Janovitch Makarenko, was a Romanian human rights activist, born in Galați, Romania to Orthodox Jewish parents, Yankel Hershkovich and Malka Weisman. When he was eight years old he ran away from home to live in the Soviet Union, being settled in many orphanages in Soviet Moldova. During World War II, from age 10 to 13, he was a "Son of the Regiment", bringing water and food to the troops.

In 1954 he married Lyudmila Makarenko and took her family name. They had son Sergei and two daughters, Liza and Olga. He actually married and divorced Lyudmila twice.

He spent a total of eleven years in prison for what the Soviet government considered to be dissident activities. His longest imprisonment was a result of a 1970 arrest for exhibiting the work of Russian avant-garde artists. He moved to the United States of America in 1979 after being exiled by the Soviet government. When asked who were the victims of communism, Makarenko is quoted as saying "Everyone who lived in the 20th century was a victim of communism."

In 1982, Makarenko's testimony was published by the Republican Conference of the U.S. Senate regarding the human cost of building a natural gas pipeline in the Soviet Union. His testimony largely concerned the treatment of the prisoners in Soviet labor camps.

== Murder ==
Makarenko was murdered at a New Jersey Turnpike rest stop on Thursday, 15 March 2007, by Brian Kuo White (born 1 December 1980). It was reported that White attacked Makarenko with a landscaping rock after Makarenko refused to buy a CD of White's Christian music from him. On 25 September 2007, White was indicted by a grand jury on counts of murder, possession of a weapon for an unlawful purpose, unlawful possession of a weapon, and eluding arrest. On 24 June 2008, he was found not guilty of these charges, by reason of legal insanity; he was committed for life plus 10 years to the state Department of Human Services for treatment.
