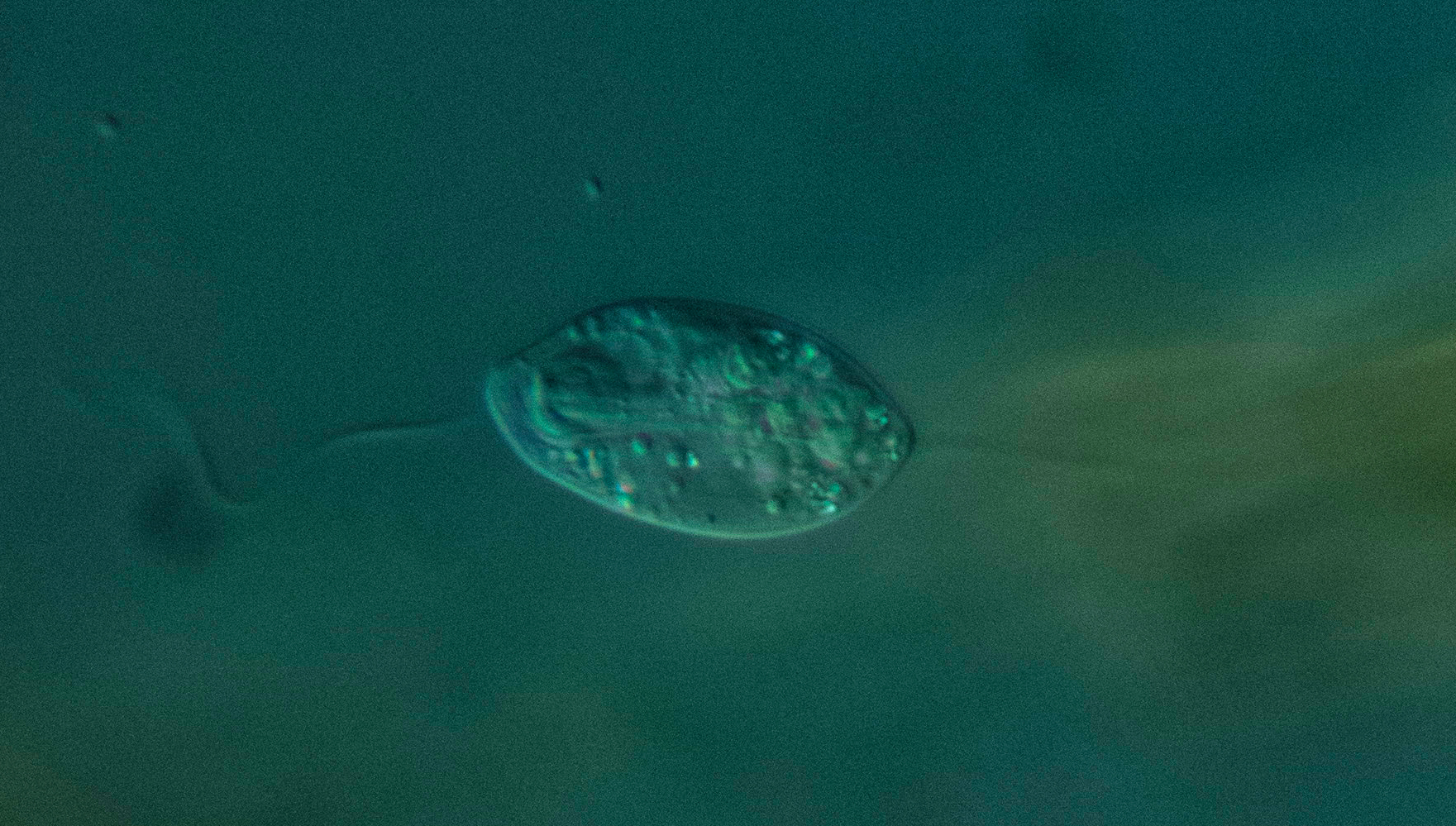
- Anisonema

Scientific classification
- Domain: Eukaryota
- Supergroup: Discoba
- Phylum: Euglenozoa
- Class: Euglenida
- Clade: Spirocuta
- Clade: Anisonemia; Cavalier-Smith, 2016

Orders & families
- Anisonemida; Anisonemidae; Natomonadida; Metanemina; Neometanemidae; Aphagea; Astasiidae; Distigmidae

Synonyms
- Anisonemea

= Anisonemia =

Group of flagellates

Anisonemia is a clade of single-celled protists belonging to the phylum Euglenozoa, relatives of the Euglenophyceae algae. They are flagellates, with two flagella for locomotion. Anisonemia includes various phagotrophic species and a group of primary osmotrophic protists known as Aphagea.

== Description ==
Members of Anisonemia are unicellular flagellates, protists that have flagella for movement. Species of this lineage have two flagella arising from the anterior region of the cell, unlike their relatives, Peranemida and Euglenophyceae, where only one flagellum is emmergent. They move through a gliding motion, where the posterior flagellum is fully in contact with the substrate and the anterior flagellum beats through its whole length in front of the cell, carrying it forward.

== Evolution ==
Anisonemia is a monophyletic group, or clade, of flagellates that contains several phagotrophic species and a clade that has evolved toward primary osmotrophy, named Aphagea. Anisonemia belongs to the Euglenida, a diverse group of flagellates that also contains the phototrophic Euglenophyceae. Together with other flagellates, they compose the phylum Euglenozoa. In particular, Anisonemia, Euglenophyceae and the phagotrophic Peranemida form a clade known as Spirocuta, distinguished by a greater number of pellicle strips than other euglenids. These strips allow the cells to actively deform their shape, a unique characteristic known as metaboly. The following cladogram depicts the evolutionary relationships of Anisonemia:

- Euglenida
  - - - Spirocuta
        - - Euglenophyceae
          - Peranemida
        - - Anisonemia
            - - Natomonadida
                - Aphagea
                - Neometanema
              - Heteronema
            - - Anisonemida
                - Anisonema
                - Dinema
    - "Ploeotiida"
  - Petalomonadida

== Classification ==
Anisonemia was first described by American protozoologist Thomas Cavalier-Smith in 2016, on the basis of phylogenetic analysis. He proposed it as a subclass of the obsolete class Peranemea, which is paraphyletic with respect to Euglenophyceae, containing Peranemida in addition to Anisonemia. To date, it is the most diverse heterotrophic clade within Spirocuta. It contains two orders, differentiated by their modes of locomotion: Anisonemida, phagotrophs that perform a gliding motion with their anterior flagellum, and Natomonadida, which move by swimming. In turn, Natomonadida comprises two subgroups: the phagotrophic Neometanema and the completely osmotrophic Aphagea. Later revisions to the classification of protists ignored this taxon, until phylogenetic studies of the 2020s supported its monophyly. In some studies, it is referred to as Anisonemea. The composition of Anisonemia is the following:

- Order Anisonemida Cavalier-Smith, 2016
  - Family Anisonemidae Kent, 1880 emend. Cavalier-Smith, 2016
- Order Natomonadida Cavalier-Smith, 2016
  - Suborder Metanemina Cavalier-Smith, 2016
    - Family Neometanemidae Cavalier-Smith, 2016
  - Clade Aphagea Leedale, 1967 emend. Cavalier-Smith, 1993
    - Family Astasiidae Kent, 1884
    - Family Distigmidae Hollande, 1942
