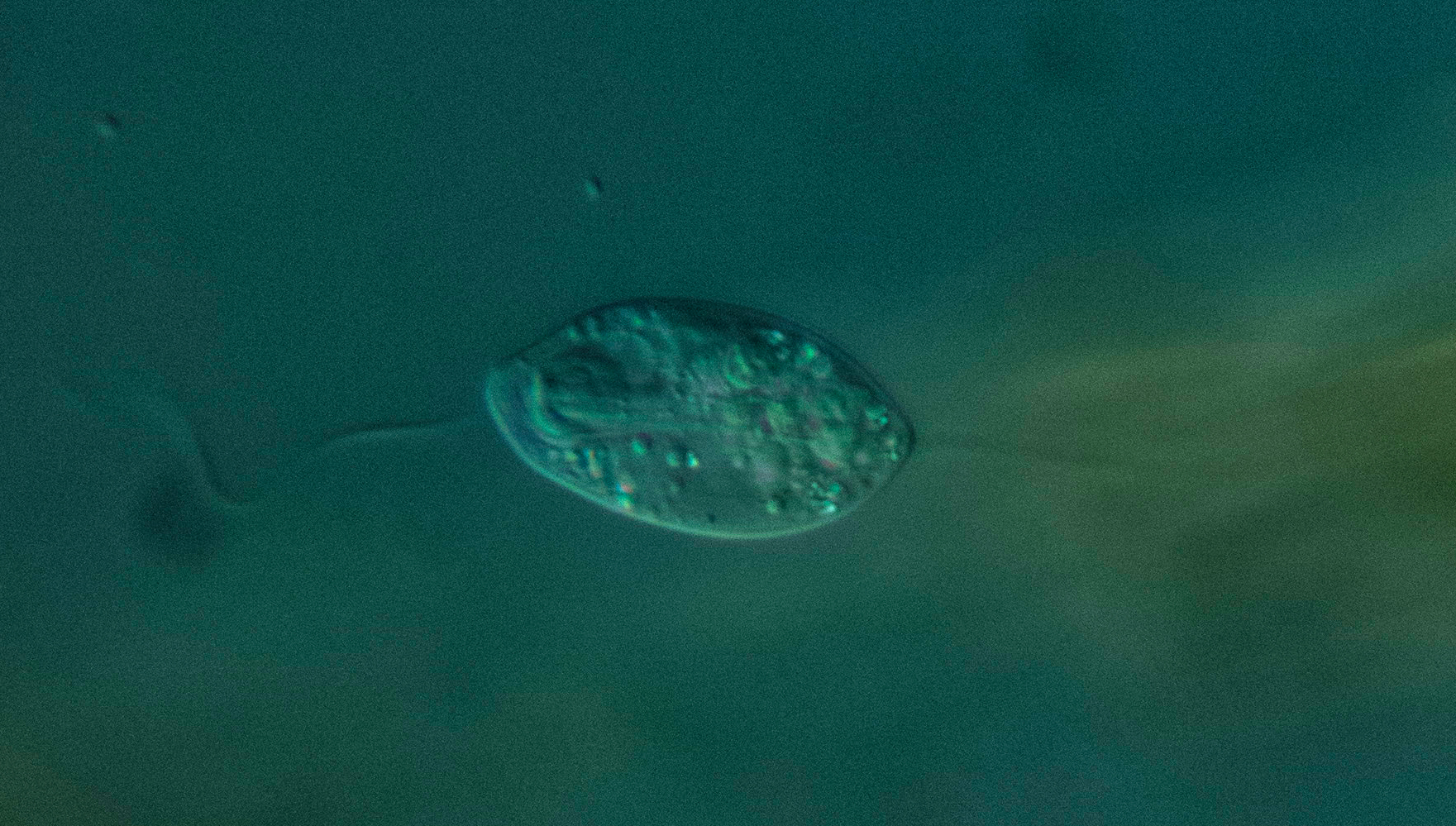
- Light micrograph of Anisonema showing the flailing anterior flagellum (to the left) and the trailing posterior flagellum (to the right)

Scientific classification
- Domain: Eukaryota
- Clade: Discoba
- Phylum: Euglenozoa
- Class: Euglenida
- Order: Anisonemida
- Family: Anisonemidae
- Genus: Anisonema; Dujardin, 1841

Type species
- Anisonema acinus Dujardin, 1841

= Anisonema =

Genus of flagellates

Anisonema (from Greek aniso- 'unequal' and -nema 'thread', meaning "unequal flagella") is a genus of colorless phagotrophic euglenid flagellates that occur in marine, brackish, and freshwater habitats around the world. Cells of Anisonema have two unequally sized flagella: a thinner anterior flagellum which flails around in front of the cell, and a thicker and longer posterior flagellum that trails behind, both emerging from the anterior region of a ventral groove in the cell. The cells glide on their posterior flagellum and can quickly reverse the direction of their movement. Like other euglenids, it has a relatively rigid protein pellicle capable of some deformation.

The genus was established by French biologist Félix Dujardin in 1841. Its type species, Anisonema acinus, is the only for which genetic data are available. Phylogenetic analyses reveal a close relationship with the genus Dinema in the family Anisonemidae, which in turn is part of the clade Anisonemia together with Neometanema and osmotrophic euglenids (Aphagea). An additional 20 species have been described throughout its history, only known from morphological observations. Their assignment to Anisonema has been problematic due to different interpretations of the diagnostic characters of the genus, such as the presence of a visible ingestion organelle. Some species previously assigned to Anisonema have been sequenced and transferred to oher genera, particularly Entosiphon, Hemiolia and Liburna.

== Etymology ==
The name Anisonema means "unequal flagella", as it derives from Greek aniso-, meaning unequal, and -nema, meaning thread, in reference to the two flagella that are of unequal lengths.

== Description ==
Anisonema is a genus of phagotrophic, single-celled flagellates found in fresh, marine and brackish waters. Each cell has two unequal, heterodynamic flagella: a shorter, thinner anterior flagellum that flails freely in front of the cell; and a longer (usually two to three times longer than the cell), often thicker, hook-shaped posterior flagellum that trails behind the cell when moving. Both flagella emerge from the anterior region of a slit-like groove located on the ventral side of the cell, where the posterior one is thickest. When moving, Anisonema cells glide on their posterior flagellum, and can reverse the direction of their movement quickly and periodically. Unlike other flagellates, the flagellar apparatus of Anisonema replicates in the late stages of mitosis, as opposed to the early stages.

The cells themselves are generally ovoid, more or less flattened and asymmetrical, usually measuring 20–70 μm in length and 12–19 μm in width. They contain a nucleus at the posterior end, contractile vacuole at the anterior end, and a long, wedge-shaped cytopharynx or feeding organelle that can be difficult to observe. They also contain a reservoir on the left side. The cell surface maintains a constant rigid shape most of the time, but is capable of some deformation. It is supported underneath by a non-thickened pellicle composed of more than 18 protein strips, as in other spirocute euglenids. Anisonema is similar in appearance to Dinema, but lacks its flexibility and thickened pellicle.

== Taxonomy ==
The genus Anisonema was first named by French biologist Félix Dujardin in his 1841 work Histoire naturelle des zoophytes. He distinguished it from other genera of biflagellates with unequal flagella due to its more resistant, non-contractile surface that is also often perfectly transparent. He erected two species, A. acinus and A. sulcata. The latter was transferred to the genus Entosiphon, while A. acinus is considered the type species.

Since its publication, around 20-36 additional species of Anisonema have been described, but it is unclear how many of these actually belong to Anisonema, as most of them are only known from morphology and lack any genetic data. They are therefore considered morphospecies. Assignment to this genus is often problematic. For example, some authors have defended that Anisonema species are distinguished by the lack of a visible specialized ingestion organelle, but other authors have observed this organelle in several specimens. Moreover, the description of the type species itself is considered insufficient to be accurately identified.

The only molecular data available up to date has been obtained from A. acinus-like cells, which, according to phylogenetic analyses, belong to the clade Spirocuta within euglenids. In particular, Anisonema belongs to the monophyletic family Anisonemidae which also contains the genus Dinema; both genera glide only on their posterior flagellum and are moderately flexible. Anisonemidae is, in turn, part of the clade Anisonemia, which also contains the osmotrophic Aphagea and the genus Neometanema. Additional genetic sequences have been isolated from species that were previously assigned to Anisonema, but these are phylogenetically more related to ploeotiids and have been transferred to the new genera Hemiolia and Liburna.

=== Species ===
Listed below are the currently accepted species of Anisonema:

- Anisonema acinus Dujardin 1841. The type species and the most commonly reported species from both freshwater and marine sites, including mainland and oceanic Australia, Europe, and Fiji. Length 20–70 μm, cells flattened and oval, flailing anterior flagellum 1–1.5 times the size of cell, hook-like trailing posterior flagellum 2–3 times the size of cell, pellicle of about 20 longitudinal protein strips, no ingestion organelle visible under light microscopy, reservoir on the left side, nucleus on the right side, cells glide until they stop and jerk backwards before moving in a new direction. Freshwater isolates have a contractile vacuole.
- Anisonema alpinum Deflandre 1925. Observed in Lac de Tavaneuse, in the Alps. Length 31–43 μm, appearance about the same as A. acinus, smooth and flattened, but often redirects its recurrent flagellum to the anterior. Later authors attribute this distinction to a common reaction in stressed cells, and do not accept it and other minor differences as justifying separation from A. acinus.
- Anisonema biargutum Z.X.Shi 1999. Observed in China.
- Anisonema bisulcatum Z.X.Shi 1999. Observed in China.
- Anisonema costatum Christen 1962. Size 57 × 60 μm, with a visible ingestion apparatus with four vanes and two rods resembling the structure found in Ploeotia and Entosiphon; otherwise like A. acinus.
- Anisonema decoloratum Rouchijajnen 1971. Observed in the Black Sea. Length 10–19 μm, width 7–12 μm, thickness 6–10 μm, cells thinner at the anterior end, similar to A. acinus except for the size of its cytopharynx and for the two conspicuous spiral grooves running through the surface.
- Anisonema obliquum Roskin 1931. The most similar to A. acinus, except for a larger size, a relatively shorter posterior flagellum, and no visible surface grooves.
- Anisonema prosgeobium Skuja 1939. Observed in Fiji, marine Australia, and Hawaii. Length 25–30 μm, width 12–16 μm, anterior flagellum 1.5 times the size of cell, posterior flagellum 2.5–3.5 times the size of cell, distinguished from A. acinus by its smooth pellicle with no observable grooves.

Previously recognized species include A. glaciale, transferred to Liburna, and A. trepidum, transferred to Hemiolia.
