= Chelandium =

Scientific classification
- Domain: Eukaryota
- (unranked): incertae sedis
- Clade: Discoba
- Phylum: Euglenozoa
- Class: Euglenida
- Clade: Olkaspira
- Genus: Chelandium; Lax, Cho & Keeling 2023
- Species: C. granulatum

Binomial name
- Chelandium granulatum Lax, Cho & Keeling 2023

Genus of flagellates

Chelandium is a genus of phagotrophic euglenids named after a Byzantine ship, chelandion. It contains a single species, Chelandium granulatum. It was discovered in marine sediment from a beach near Vancouver, Canada, and described in 2023. Cells of Chelandium have two flagella and glide on their longer posterior flagellum. Their cytoplasm contains numerous refractile granules, a characteristic reflected in the specific epithet granulatum.

According to phylogenetic analyses, it branches within ploeotids, a paraphyletic group of euglenids with rigid cells. It is the sister group to the ploeotid Olkasia.

== Etymology ==
The generic name Chelandium is derived from the latinized name for chelandion, a war galley of the Byzantine navy that was also used for transport. The specific epithet granulatum, Latin for 'granulate', refers to the granulated appearance of the organism due to refractile granules in its cytoplasm.

== Description ==
Chelandium is a genus of free-living heterotrophic euglenids, a kind of single-celled organism with two flagella used for movement. In particular, this organism glides on its posterior flagellum relatively fast and in a straight line. The cell is oblong, slightly flattened on its ventral side, and full of refractile granules. The anterior flagellum is around the same length as the cell length, whereas the posterior flagellum is around 4.4 times the cell length and is considerably thicker.

== Taxonomy ==
Location of Centennial Beach, the type locality of Chelandium granulatum in the province of British Columbia, Canada

Chelandium granulatum was described from a single cell isolated from oxic marine intertidal sediment. The material was recovered from a beach near Vancouver. After genetic analysis, it was formally described as a new genus and species in 2023 by protistologists Gordon Lax, Anna Cho and Patrick J. Keeling. Through subsequent phylogenetic analyses, it was found to branch among ploeotids, a paraphyletic group of heterotrophic euglenids that are spread throughout the backbone of the euglenid evolutionary tree, between the basal petalomonads and the derived flexible euglenids (e.g., euglenophyte algae). In particular, Chelandium is the closest relative of the ploeotid genus Olkasia. Together, these two genera form the sister group to flexible euglenids.
