= Dinema platysomum =

Scientific classification
- Domain: Eukaryota
- Clade: Discoba
- Phylum: Euglenozoa
- Class: Euglenida
- Order: Anisonemida
- Family: Anisonemidae
- Genus: Dinema
- Species: D. platysomum

Binomial name
- Dinema platysomum (Skuja) W.J.Lee & D.J.Patterson

Synonyms
- Anisonema platysomum Skuja

Species of eukaryote

The flagellated alga Dinema platysomum, synonym Anisonema platysomum, is the first eukaryote in which magnetotactic structures have been discovered. Monje & Baran (2004) describe how this euglenoid alga stores magnetite in a similar way that already discovered magnetotactic bacteria do. It has been shown that the cells contain magnetite particles aligned with the longitudinal axis of the alga, and each magnetite chain is a permanent dipole. The observed magnetic momentum of the cell has been estimated to be 1000 times stronger than those of typical magnetotactic bacteria.

The species was first described in 1939 as Anisonema platysomum, and transferred to the genus Dinema in 2000.
