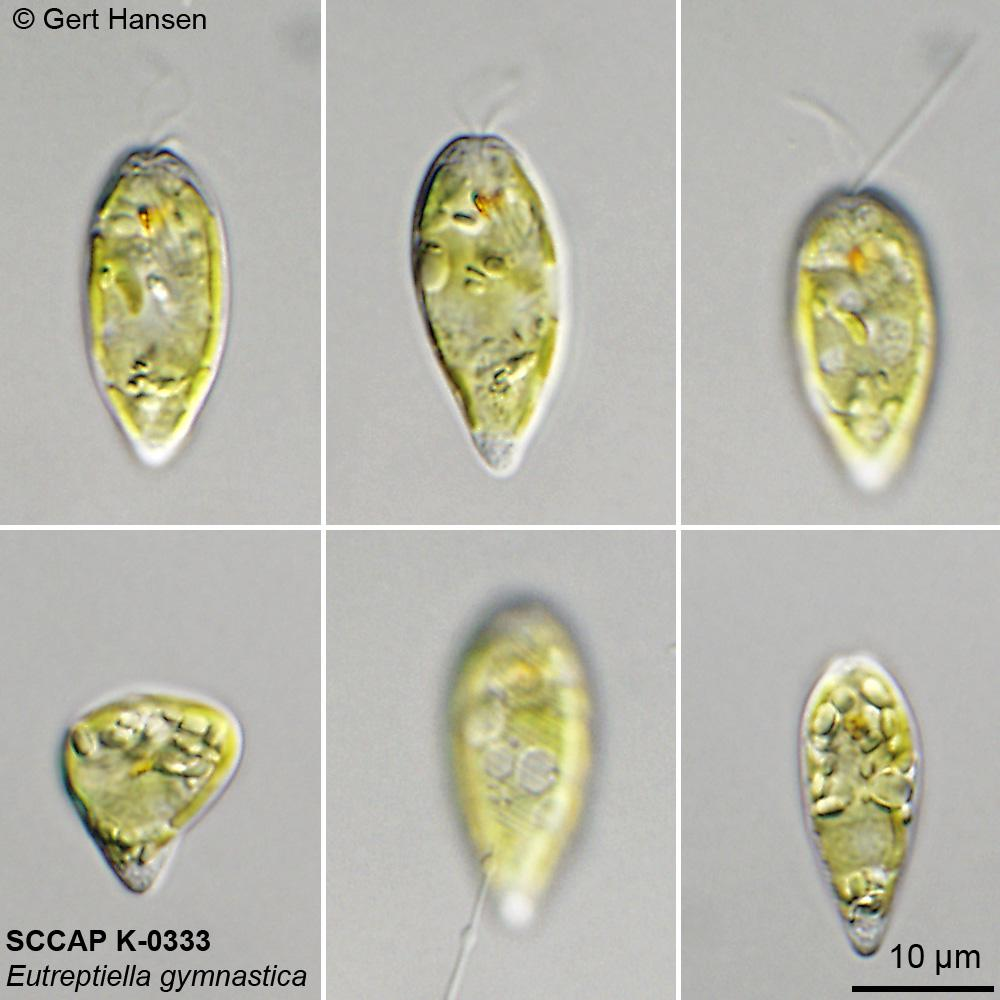
- Eutreptiella gymnastica

Scientific classification
- Domain: Eukaryota
- Clade: incertae sedis
- Clade: Discoba
- Phylum: Euglenozoa
- Class: Euglenida
- Clade: Euglenophyceae
- Order: Eutreptiales
- Family: Eutreptiaceae
- Genus: Eutreptiella; A.M.da Cunha

Type species
- Eutreptiella marina A.M.da Cunha

= Eutreptiella =

Genus of algae

Eutreptiella is a genus of Euglenozoa belonging to the family Eutreptiaceae (Eutreptiidae). The genus was first described by A. M. da Cunha in 1914.

The genus has a cosmopolitan distribution.

== Description ==
Eutreptiella consists of single, free-swimming flagellate cells. Cells have two or four unequal flagella, an eyespot (stigma), and discoid, stellate or reticulate chloroplasts (according to the species) The cells exhibit a form of movement called metaboly.

== Habitat and ecology ==
Eutreptiella is found in marine habitats (typically in the neritic zone), or in brackish habitats such as estuaries. During spring and summer, it can form blooms and become locally dominant. At least one species (E. eupharyngea) is mixotrophic and feeds on marine heteretrophic bacteria and cyanobacteria. Blooms of euglenoids can be beneficial, as a source of nutrition for animals. However, Eutreptiella has also been implicated in fish kills in Mexico.

== Biochemistry ==
The chloroplast genome of Eutreptiella gymnastica is 67,622 base pairs long. It appears to have gone through considerable genome reduction compared to its freshwater relatives Euglena. Eutreptiella is able to adjust its photosynthesis rate and lipid production according to external environmental factors, through a complex transcriptomic system.

Eutreptiella species are able to produce a variety of bioactive compounds, such as omega-3 fatty acids. They are also candidates for algal biofuel production, due to their high rate of lipid production.

== Taxonomy ==
Eutreptiella is very similar to Eutreptia, the main difference being that the flagella are significantly unequal in length. In some phylogenetic analyses, Eutreptiella is recovered as paraphyletic with respect to Eutreptia.

Species:

- Eutreptiella braarudii Throndsen
- Eutreptiella cornubiense Butcher
- Eutreptiella dofleinii (Schiller) Pascher
- Eutreptiella elegans (Schiller) Pascher
- Eutreptiella eupharyngea Moestrup & R.E.Norris
- Eutreptiella gymnastica Throndsen
- Eutreptiella hirudoidea Butcher
- Eutreptiella marina A.M.da Cunha
- Eutreptiella pascheri (Schiller) Pascher
- Eutreptiella pomquetensis (McLachlan, Seguel & Fritz) Marin & Melkonian
