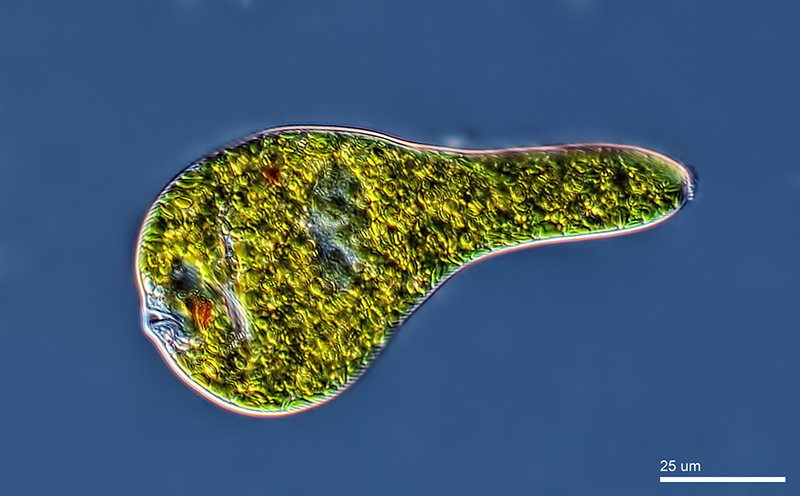
- Cell exhibiting 'euglenoid motion' or metaboly, characteristic of this clade

Scientific classification
- Domain: Eukaryota
- Clade: Discoba
- Phylum: Euglenozoa
- Class: Euglenida
- Clade: Olkaspira
- Clade: Spirocuta; Cavalier-Smith, 2016

Orders
- Peranemida; Euglenophyceae; Rapazida; Euglenophycidae; Eutreptiales; Euglenales; Anisonemia; Anisonemida; Natomonadida

Synonyms
- Helicales Paerschke et al., 2017

= Spirocuta =

Group of flagellates with flexible cells

Spirocuta (from Latin spira 'coil, spire' and cutis 'skin') is a clade of euglenids, single-celled eukaryotes or protists belonging to the phylum Euglenozoa. They are distinguished from other euglenids by active deformation of their cell shape, a process called euglenid motion or metaboly. This is made possible by a high number of spirally arranged protein strips that run below their cell membrane and confer the cell with flexibility. These strips compose the helicoidal pellicle, a trait referenced by the alternative name Helicales.

== Description ==
Spirocuta is a group of flagellates, unicellular eukaryotes or protists with one or two flagella for locomotion in the anterior region of the cell. The move through a gliding motion in contact with the substrate to propel the cell forward. Like other members of the Euglenida, their cells are lined by a pellicle composed of proteinaceous strips that interlock with each other, and are spirally arranged underneath the cell membrane. In particular, members of Spirocuta share a synapomorphy, or unique trait: their high number of strips (between 16 and 56) confers the cells with an immense flexibility, allowing them to actively stretch and deform. This process is known as metaboly or euglenid motion.

Euglena, moving by metaboly and swimming

== Classification ==
Spirocuta was first proposed by American protozoologist Thomas Cavalier-Smith in 2016, as a superclass uniting all those euglenids with more than 15 spirally arranged pellicle strips. It was named in reference of this characteristic, from Latin spira 'coil, spire' and cutis 'skin'. It contained two classes: Euglenophyceae, a monophyletic group of phototrophs, and Peranemea, a paraphyletic group of heterotrophs. Later, Peranemea was separated into two distinct clades: Peranemida, a group of phagotrophs whose monophyly is yet to be proven, and Anisonemia, which contains various phagotrophs and a clade of osmotrophs known as Aphagea. In 2017, Stefan Paerschke and colleagues independently noticed the same clade through phylogenetic analyses, and named it Helicales in reference to the helical pellicle composed of spirally arranged strips. The following cladogram depicts the evolutionary relationships of Spirocuta according to phylogenetic studies published in the early 2020s:

- Euglenozoa
  - Euglenida
    - - - Spirocuta
          - - Euglenophyceae
              - - Euglenophycidae
                  - Eutreptiales
                  - Euglenales
              - Rapaza
            - Peranemida
              - - - Urceolus
                  - Chasmostoma
                - - "Jenningsia"
                  - Peranema
              - "Jenningsia"
          - - Anisonemia
              - - Natomonadida
                  - Aphagea
                  - Neometanema
                - Heteronema
              - Anisonemida
      - "Ploeotids"
    - Petalomonadida
  - - - Kinetoplastea
      - Diplonemea
    - Symbiontida
