= Heteronema trispira =

Scientific classification
- Domain: Eukaryota
- Clade: Discoba
- Phylum: Euglenozoa
- Class: Euglenida
- Genus: Heteronema
- Species: H. trispira

Binomial name
- Heteronema trispira Matvienko, 1938

Species of euglenoid

Heteronema trispira is a spirally twisted flagellated euglenoid from the genus Heteronema first described by Olexandra Matvienko in 1938.

== Description ==
Heteronema trispira has a spindle-shaped body up to 130 μm long, twisted into a spiral with three characteristic counterclockwise turns. It has a central nucleus, two long flagella and an apparently smooth periplast that tapers to a "snout-like" extension. The cell is filled with very small paramylon grains.

One specimen was described as containing phagocytosed algae.

== Habitat and range ==
H. trispira is rare, known only from a few isolated observations since 1938. Observations have been recorded from wetlands in Ukraine, Bulgaria and Germany. One cell was recorded from a freshwater lake in Florida.
