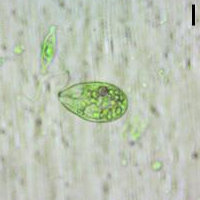
- Petalomonas mediocannellata var. disomata. Scale bar: 10 μm.

Scientific classification
- Domain: Eukaryota
- Clade: Discoba
- Phylum: Euglenozoa
- Class: Euglenida
- Order: Petalomonadida
- Family: Scytomonadidae
- Genus: Petalomonas; Stein, 1859

Type species
- Petalomonas abcissa (Dujardin, 1841) Stein, 1859

= Petalomonas =

Genus of algae

Petalomonas is a genus of phagotrophic, flagellated euglenoids. Phagotrophic euglenoids are one of the most important forms of flagellates in benthic aquatic systems, playing an important role in microbial food webs. The traits that distinguish this particular genus are highly variable, especially at higher taxa. However, general characteristics such as a rigid cell shape and single emergent flagellum can describe the species among this genus. This genus belongs to the Scytomonadidae family and the Petalomonadida order.

== History of knowledge ==
Petalomonas was first described by Dr. Friedrich Stein, a zoologist at the University of Prague, in 1859.

== Habitat and ecology ==
Petalomonas is a cosmopolitan genus, most abundant in fresh water with a few species observed in marine environments. These euglenoids mainly reside in muddy sediments as benthic organisms. The cells are phagotrophic, feeding on bacteria, and/or osmotophic, assimilating nutrients from its surroundings.

== Description ==
These non-metabolic, colourless cells range in size from 8–45 um, with a general flattened, leaf-like shape. The posterior end is rounded or truncate and the anterior end is narrowed; however, cells can span from ovoid, to fusiform or triangular, to elongately oval. A distinguishing feature of the euglenoids is the presence of proteinaceous pellicle strips that are underlined with microtubules. In Petalomonas, cells are covered with approximately a dozen thickly, fused pellicle strips making the cell very rigid and possibly resistant to surface ice crystal formation that can disrupt the cell. These pellicle strips, unlike most euglenoids, are lacking grooves or troughs; however, species specific pellicle features, such as pleat-like thickenings at the joints of pellicle strips, that characterize P. cantuscygni, can distinguish certain species. Strong ribs or keels are also evident in these cells, which can be arranged spirally or relatively straight, ranging in width. Some species may contain furrows that vary in size and depth, and can be located dorsally and/or ventrally on the body of the cell. The cells also have an abundance of paramylon bodies, typically used for the storage of carbohydrates, that are observed in all species.

The feeding structure, not visible under light microscopy, is relatively simple consisting of a pocket-like cavity ending with a cytostome, lined with microtubules for phagocytosis. The cells within this genus are also defined by one emergent flagellum extending from a sub-apical opening, directed anteriorly when swimming. The movement of this flagellum is very minimal with some vibration at the tip; however, some species are observed to have vigorously, whipping flagellum that result in rapid rotation and oscillation of the cell body. These euglenoids have also been observed to glide forward using the body, while the flagellum is used to contact the substrate. The nucleus is located centrally to the left side of the cell.

== Life history ==
In euglenoids, sexual reproduction is unknown; however, asexual reproduction has been observed to occur in this genus through longitudinal fission, where the division occurs very quickly, starting at the anterior end of the cell.

== List of species ==
- Petalomonas abscissa (Dujardin) Stein
- Petalomonas acuminata Hollande
- Petalomonas africana Bourrelly
- Petalomonas alata (A.C. Stokes) A.C. Stokes
- Petalomonas applanata Skuja
- Petalomonas arcuata Hollande
- Petalomonas asymmetrica Schawhan & Jahn
- Petalomonas bicarinata Shawhan & Jahn
- Petalomonas calycimonadoides Christen
- Petalomonas calycimonoides W.J.Lee & D.J.Patterson
- Petalomonas cantuscygni J.Cann & N.Pennick
- Petalomonas carinata A.C.Stokes
- Petalomonas christenii W.J.Lee & D.J.Patterson
- Petalomonas conchata Christen
- Petalomonas curvata Skuja
- Petalomonas dentata Christen
- Petalomonas dilatata Hollande
- Petalomonas dorsalis Stokes
- Petalomonas dubosqui Hollande
- Petalomonas excavata Skuja
- Petalomonas gibbera Christen
- Petalomonas gigas Skuja
- Petalomonas hyalina Christen
- Petalomonas inflexa G.A.Klebs
- Petalomonas intorta W.J.Lee & D.J.Patterson
- Petalomonas involuta Skuja
- Petalomonas irregularis Skuja
- Petalomonas iugosa W.J.Lee & D.J.Patterson
- Petalomonas kkongi Lee
- Petalomonas klebsii Christen
- Petalomonas klinostoma Skuja
- Petalomonas labrum W.J.Lee & D.J.Patterson
- Petalomonas larseni Lee & Lax
- Petalomonas lata Christen
- Petalomonas masanensis Lee
- Petalomonas mediocanellata F. Stein
- Petalomonas messikommeri Christen
- Petalomonas micra R.E.Norris
- Petalomonas minor Larson & D.J. Patterson
- Petalomonas minuta Hollande
- Petalomonas minutula Christen
- Petalomonas mira Awerinzew
- Petalomonas ornata Skvortzov
- Petalomonas ovata Skvortzov
- Petalomonas ovum Matvienko
- Petalomonas paludosa Christen
- Petalomonas pentacarinata Péterfi
- Petalomonas phacoides Skuja
- Petalomonas plana W.J.Lee & D.J.Patterson
- Petalomonas platyrhyncha Skuja
- Petalomonas pluteus Christen
- Petalomonas praegnans Skuja
- Petalomonas pringsheimii Christen
- Petalomonas prototheca Skuja
- Petalomonas punctato-striata Skuja
- Petalomonas pusilla Skuja
- Petalomonas quadrilineata Penard
- Petalomonas quinquecarinata Hollande
- Petalomonas quinquemarginata Shawhan & Jahn
- Petalomonas robusta Christen
- Petalomonas sampali Lee
- Petalomonas septemcarinata Shawhan & Jahn
- Petalomonas sexlobata Klebs
- Petalomonas simplex Christen
- Petalomonas sinica Skvortzov
- Petalomonas sinuata F.Stein
- Petalomonas sphagnicola Tschermak-Woess
- Petalomonas sphagnophila Christen
- Petalomonas spinifera (Lackey) W.J.Lee & D.J.Patterson
- Petalomonas splendens Hollande
- Petalomonas steinii Klebs
- Petalomonas stellata Skvortzov
- Petalomonas sulcata A.C.Stokes
- Petalomonas tenuis Christen
- Petalomonas triangula Z.X.Shi
- Petalomonas tricarinata Skuja
- Petalomonas triquetra Skvortzov
- Petalomonas variabilis Christen
- Petalomonas ventritracta Skuja
- Petalomonas virgata W.J.Lee & D.J.Patterson
- Petalomonas vulgaris Skuja
- Petalomonas wuhanica Z.Shi
