= Glycomonada =

Scientific classification
- Domain: Eukaryota
- Clade: Discoba
- Phylum: Euglenozoa
- Subphylum: Glycomonada; Cavalier-Smith, 2016

Classes
- Diplonemea; Kinetoplastea

Subphylum of euglenozoans

Glycomonada are a basal euglenozoan subphylum, following Cavalier-Smith. As euglenozoans may be basal eukaryotes, the Glycomonada may be key to studying the evolution of eukaryotes, including the incorporation of eukaryotic traits such as the incorporation of alphaproteobacterial mitochondrial endosymbionts.

- Euglenozoa
  - Glycomonada
    - Diplonemea
      - Diplonemida
        - Hemistasiidae
        - Diplonemidae
    - Kinetoplastea
      - Prokinetoplastina
        Ichthyobodonidae
      - Metakinetoplastina
        - Rhynchobodo
        - - Neobodonidae
          - - Parabodonidae
            - - Bodonidae
              - Trypanosomatidae
  - - Postgaardea
    - Euglenoida
