= Neometanema =

Scientific classification
- Domain: Eukaryota
- Clade: Discoba
- Phylum: Euglenozoa
- Class: Euglenida
- Order: Natomonadida
- Suborder: Metanemina; Cavalier-Smith, 2016
- Family: Neometanemidae; Cavalier-Smith, 2016
- Genus: Neometanema; Lee & Simpson, 2014

Type species
- Neometanema parovale Lee & Simpson, 2014

Genus of flagellates

Neometanema is a genus of phagotrophic flagellates belonging to the Euglenida, a diverse group of flagellates in the phylum Euglenozoa. It is the sole genus within the monotypic family Neometanemidae and suborder Metanemina. It composes the order Natomonadida together with a closely related clade of osmotrophs known as Aphagea.

== Description ==
Neometanema is a genus of unicellular flagellates, microscopic eukaryotes or protists that swim by using two flagella that are equally long. The cells are flattened in shape, with a visible feeding apparatus. It is a euglenid, characterized by the presence of pellicle strips below the cell surface; in particular, Neometanema species have 22 pellicle strips arranged helically through the cell. Like other euglenids of the Spirocuta clade, Neometanema cells are capable of metaboly (flexible peristaltic movement), although more weakly than others. They are distinguished by the closely related genera Heteronema and Anisonema by their skidding motility that involves both flagella.
