= Heteronema =

Scientific classification
- Domain: Eukaryota
- Clade: Discoba
- Phylum: Euglenozoa
- Class: Euglenida
- Clade: Spirocuta
- Clade: incertae sedis
- Genus: Heteronema; Dujardin, 1841

Genus of spirocute euglenids

Heteronema is a genus of phagotrophic, flagellated euglenoids that are most widely distributed in fresh water environments. This genus consists of two very distinguishable morphogroups that are phylogenetically closely related. These morphogroups are deciphered based on shape, locomotion, and other ultrastructural traits. However, this genus does pose taxonomic problems due to the varying historical descriptions of Heteronema species and their similarity to the genus Peranema. The species H. exaratum was the first heteronemid with a skidding motion to be sequenced, which led to the discovery that it was not closely related to H. scaphrum, contrary to what was previously assumed, but instead to a sister group of primary osmotrophs. This suggests that skidding heteronemids can also be distinguished phylogenetically, being more closely related to Anisoma, Dinema, and Aphageae, than to other species within Heteronema.

== Taxonomy ==
The Heteronema genus was first described by Félix Dujardin, a French zoologist in 1841, as having variable shape, then typified in 1970 by Bourelly as an Anisonema. In 1970, Stein modified the description to include cells with two flagella and the descriptions of two new species with one containing ingestion rods. It was difficult separating this genus from Peranema; however, in 1967 Leedale described Parenema to be different based on a more flattened morphology and a trailing flagellum pressed to the side of the cell compared to Heteronema.

The genus appears to be polyphyletic, with some species possibly falling into the order of Peranemida and others into Anisonemida. A 2021 review of Euglenozoa left it unplaced as to family and order within the clade Spirocuta, and considered that many of its species should be transferred to Teloprocta, which is placed in Peranemida.

=== List of species ===
As of May 2023, AlgaeBase recognized the following species:

- Heteronema abruptum Skuja
- Heteronema aciforme Z.X.Shi
- Heteronema acus (Ehrenberg) F.Stein
- Heteronema acuta Wawrik
- Heteronema acutissimum Lemmermann
- Heteronema aquae Skvortzov
- Heteronema bifurcata H.Silva
- Heteronema capitatum Z.X.Shi
- Heteronema citriformis Wawrik
- Heteronema diaphanum Skuja
- Heteronema discomorphum Skuja
- Heteronema distigmoides Christen
- Heteronema eneydae Skvortzov
- Heteronema fidalgae Skvortzov
- Heteronema fusiforme Skvortzov
- Heteronema globuliferum (Ehrenberg) F.Stein
- Heteronema hexagonum (Playfair) Skuja
- Heteronema invaginata Prowse
- Heteronema klebsii Senn
- Heteronema leptosomum Skuja
- Heteronema longiovata H.Silva
- Heteronema marina Dujardin
- Heteronema medusae Skvortzov
- Heteronema metabolissimum Wawrik
- Heteronema mutabile (A.Stokes) Lemmermann
- Heteronema nebuloglabrum H.Silva
- Heteronema ovalis Kahl
- Heteronema palmeri Skvortzov
- Heteronema plicatum Skuja
- Heteronema polymorphum Deflandre
- Heteronema proteus Christen
- Heteronema pterbica Schroeckh, W.J.Lee & D.J.Patterson
- Heteronema punctato Skvortzov
- Heteronema robusta Skvortzov
- Heteronema rosae-mariae Skvortzov
- Heteronema sacculus Skuja
- Heteronema saopaulensis Skvortzov
- Heteronema scabra Z.Cyrus
- Heteronema shii Kapustin & D.Davydov
- Heteronema similis Skvortzov
- Heteronema spirale Klebs
- Heteronema spirogyra Skuja
- Heteronema splendens J.Larsen & D.J.Patterson
- Heteronema subsucculus Z.Shi
- Heteronema taurica Vetrova
- Heteronema tortum Z.Shi
- Heteronema tortuosum Christen
- Heteronema trachelomonades Skvortzov
- Heteronema tremulum Zacharias
- Heteronema trispira Matvienko
- Heteronema vetrovae Kapustin & D.Davydov

== Description ==
The Heteronema genus consists of diverse, colorless euglenoids that range in size from 8 - 75 micrometer ($\mu$m). Euglenoids are assigned to this genus if they have characteristics such as an ingestion apparatus, a capacity for flagellar movement, and a recurrent flagellum that is not adpressed to the ventral side of the cell. The cells are covered with a large number of proteinaceous pellicle strips with microtubules lined underneath. These pellicle strips are a distinguishing feature of the euglenoids, that allows the cells to undergo metaboly, giving the cell flexibility and movement. Heteronema, under the light microscope, is morphologically similar to Peranema, where both groups are metabolic, have the ability to glide, have visible feedings rods, and two different flagellum on opposite ends of the cell. Heteronema is separated into two specific morphogroups, one consisting of elongate and very flexible cells that move by gliding, holding the anterior flagellum out in front of the cell. This morphogroup includes the species H. scaphrum. In contrast, the second group consists of ovoid, more rigid cells that have a characteristic rapid "skidding" swimming behavior. Examples of species within this group are H. ovale and H. exaratum. The skidding behavior is very similar to the primary osmotrophs, where the motion is powered by the beating of the anterior flagellum, positioned in a curve to the right of the cell, in a sinusoidal pattern. This may also reflect the evolution of ancestral phagotrophic euglenoids, where almost all species swam poorly and relied on gliding instead of flagellar movement. The flagella are hollow with heteromorphic paraxonemal rods, covered with sheaths of hairs. In accordance to its name, the anterior emergent flagella is longer and thicker, directed anteriorly and used for locomotion, and the shorter, thinner flagellum is directed posteriorly. The feeding apparatus is usually quite small, composed of separate microtubule rods and surrounded by spiral striations at the anterior end of the cell.

== Habitat and ecology ==
Heteronema is generally widespread and commonly found in brackish pools and fresh water ponds; however, some species are observed to exist in marine environments. These euglenoids are phagotrophic, making them important in benthic systems and microbial food webs.

== Life history ==
There is no sexual reproduction observed in the euglenoids; however, asexual reproduction can occur through mitosis followed by cytokinesis, where basal bodies and flagellar systems replicate first, followed by the feeding system. After the duplication of the nucleus and cytoskeleton, a cleavage furrow appears, migrating from the flagellar pocket to the anterior opening, and then to the posterior end, separating the parent from the daughter cell.
