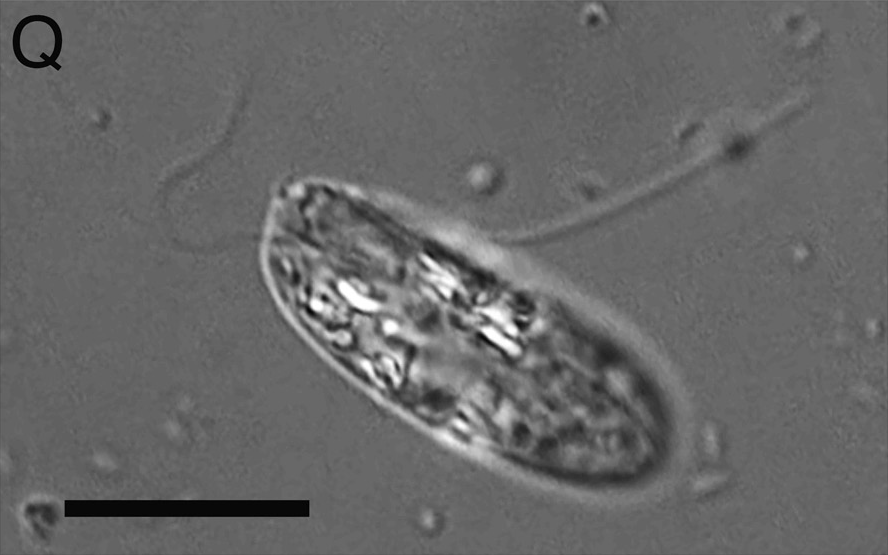
- Differencial interference contrast micrograph of Entosiphon oblongum. Scale bar: 10 μm.

Scientific classification
- Domain: Eukaryota
- Clade: Discoba
- Phylum: Euglenozoa
- Class: Euglenida
- Clade: incertae sedis
- Genus: Entosiphon; Stein 1878

Type species
- Entosiphon sulcatum (Dujardin 1841) Stein 1878

Other species
- Entosiphon oblongum

= Entosiphon =

Genus of euglenids

Entosiphon is a genus of euglenids. It was described by Friedrich Stein in 1878.

== Description ==
Entosiphon is a genus of phagotrophic euglenids, single-celled flagellates with two flagella characterized by a protein pellicle present beneath the cell membrane. In particular, Entosiphon cells are distinguished by a protrusible ingestion apparatus. Their pellicle is composed of twelve protein strips.

== Classification ==
The genus Entosiphon was described by Friedrich Stein in 1878. It was established to transfer a species of Anisonema, A. sulcata, to a separate genus, which changed the original spelling of this species to E. sulcatum. A second species, E. oblongum, was described in 2016.

The evolutionary position of Entosiphon among euglenids is unstable, either branching with Hemiolia and Liburna or forming a separate branch, depending on the methods and datasets used. In all cases, it consistently branches among basal, non-flexible euglenids, outside of any major euglenid group.
