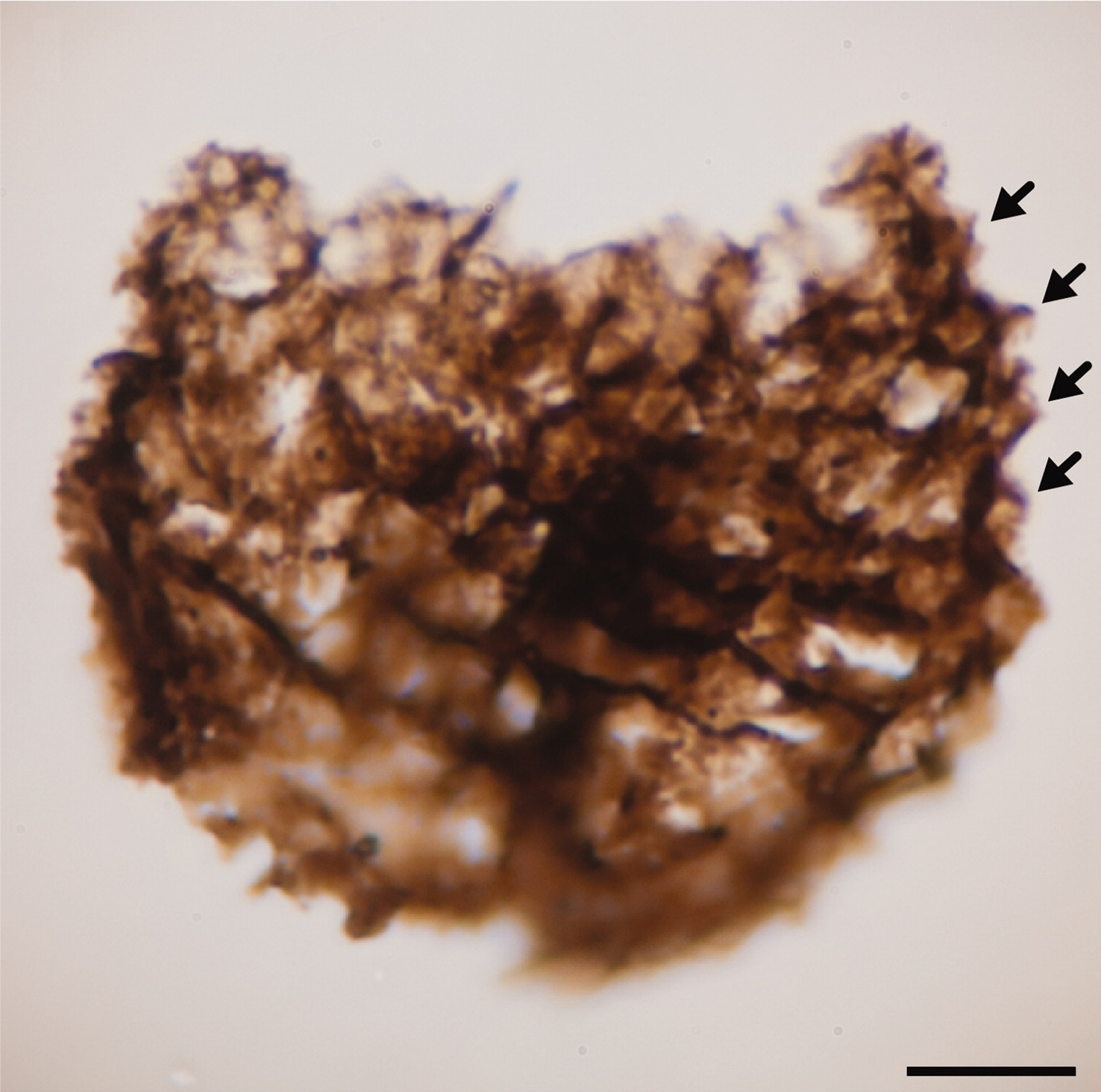

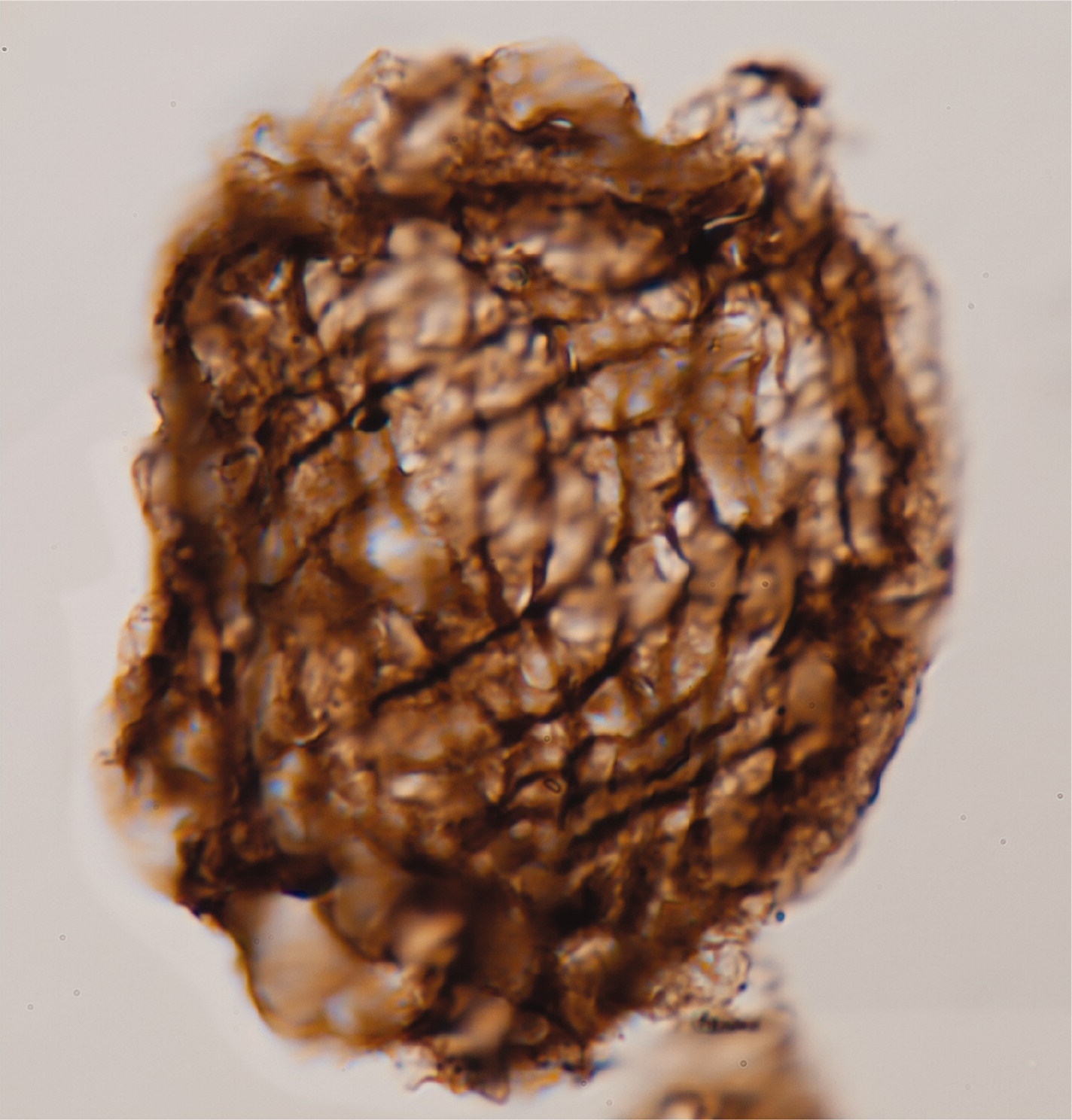
- Transmitted white light micrographs of Moyeria sp. showing pellicle strips (arrows). Scale bar: 10 μm.

Scientific classification
- Domain: Eukaryota
- Clade: Discoba
- Phylum: Euglenozoa
- Class: Euglenida
- Genus: †Moyeria; Thusu 1973, emend. Miller & Eames 1982

Type species
- Moyeria uticana Thusu 1973

Species
- M. uticana; M. cabottii

= Moyeria =

Moyeria Temporal range: Middle Ordovician–Silurian

Fossil flagellate

Moyeria is a genus of fossils interpreted as euglenids, a type of microbial eukaryotes characterized for their cells surrounded by a pellicle composed of proteinaceous strips. Described in 1973, the genus contains two species, M. uticana and M. cabottii, that fossilized from the Middle Ordovician to the Silurian.

== Description ==
Moyeria is a genus of fossils initially considered acritarchs, of unknown evolutionary affinity. They were widely interpreted as resting cysts of marine algae. Its vesicle wall has a distinct ultrastructure that resembles the pellicle of euglenids, which is composed of proteinaceous strips. For this reason, during the 20th century some authors proposed Moyeria as part of the Euglenida. After examinations through transmission electron microscopy, the stripes in the wall of these microfossils were revealed to correspond to the pellicle strips of modern euglenids, and Moyeria was formally transferred to the Euglenida in 2019.

== Classification ==
Moyeria was first described in 1973 by paleontologist Brinda Thusu from microfossils located along the south branch of Moyer Creek, near the town of Ilion, New York. The fossils originate from the Wenlock epoch, in the Silurian, and were assigned to the species Moyeria uticaensis. Thusu published four illustrated specimens along with the species description, but he did not specify which one was the holotype. In 1976, some authors proposed Moyeria uticaensis as a junior synonym of another species of striated acritarchs, Eupoikilofusa cabottii. However, the genus Eupoikilofusa was rejected by other authors because the vesicle was not consistently fusiform, and the species E. cabottii was instead transferred to Moyeria as M. cabottii. Subsequently, several helically striated acritarchs with variable shape that were found in Ordovician and Silurian rocks were assigned to M. cabottii.

In 2019, Paul K. Strother and coauthors located the original intended holotype specimen according to the coordinates given by Thusu in 1973, consequently validating the genus Moyeria. They corrected the type species epithet to M. uticana. After analyzing more material from the original rocks, they managed to further investigate and distinguish the two proposed fossil species. Thus, two species are currently accepted in this genus:

- Moyeria uticana (=M. uticaensis) Thusu, 1973
- Moyeria cabottii (Cramer) Miller & Eames, 1982 (=Eupoikilofusa cabottii Cramer, 1971)
