= Moyer Creek =

- Location of the mouth of Moyer Creek Moyer Creek (the United States)

Location
- Country: United States
- State: New York

Physical characteristics
- Source: Wheelock Pond
  - location: Jerusalem Hill, New York
- Mouth: Mohawk River
  - location: Frankfort, New York
  - coordinates: 43°02′37″N 75°04′10″W
  - elevation: 385 ft (117 m)
- Basin size: 20.2 sq mi (52 km^{2})

Basin features
- Tributaries
  - left: Black Creek

Moyer Creek is a stream in Upstate New York that starts at Wheelock Pond near Jerusalem Hill, New York. Its headwaters rise within a half mile of the sources of the Unadilla River, which is the most northerly headwater source of the Susquehanna River and the closest tributary to the Mohawk River. Past Gulph, Moyer Creek follows a deep ravine, the Frankfort Gorge, northeasterly before converging with the Mohawk River in Frankfort, where the Erie Canal also joins into the Mohawk River just 550 yd (500 m) downstream of the confluence.

The fossil of Moyeria, a Paleozoic euglenid flagellate, was found in outcrops located near the Moyer Creek and has been named after it.
