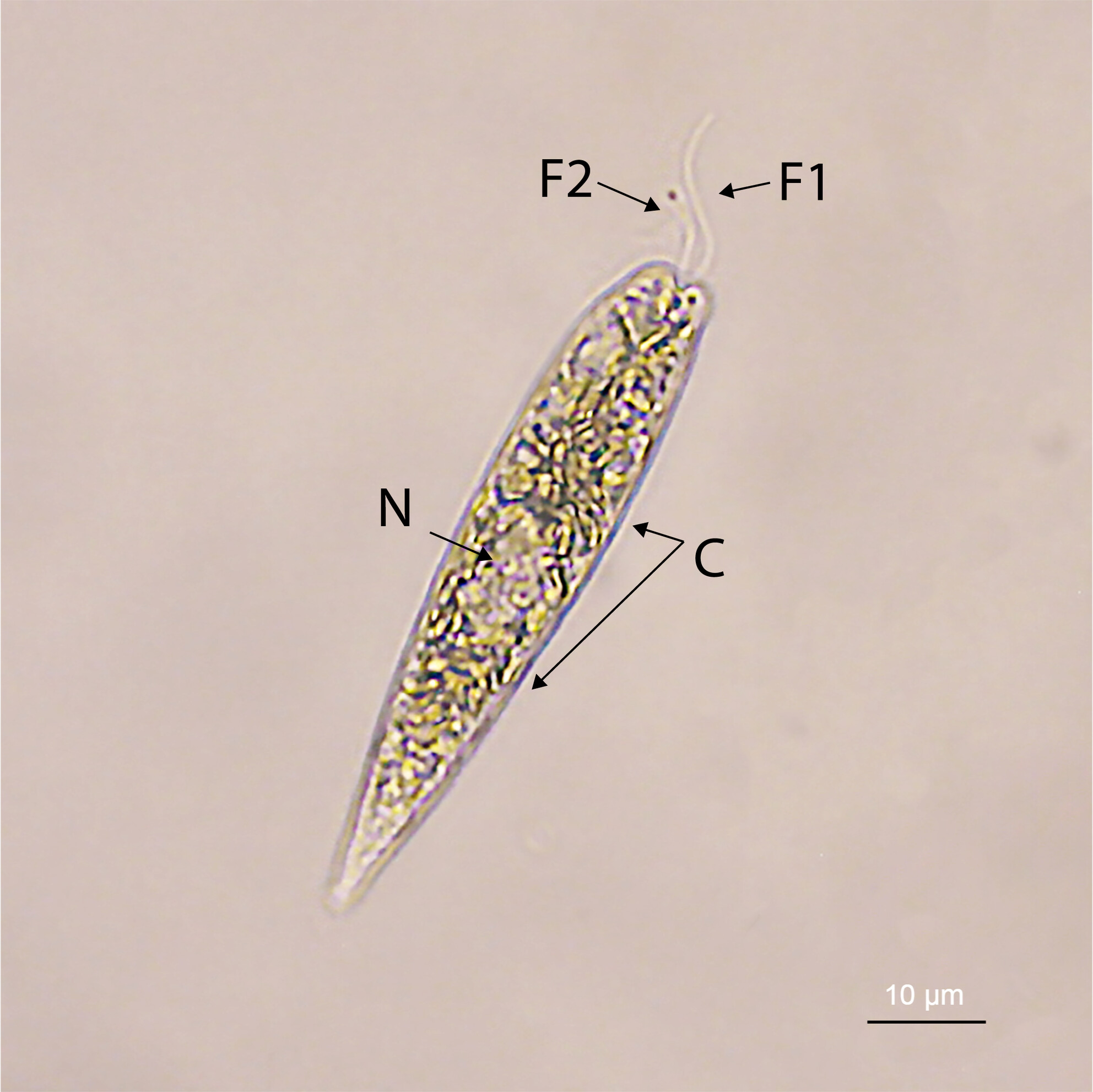
- Eutreptiella sp.

Scientific classification
- Domain: Eukaryota
- Clade: Discoba
- Phylum: Euglenozoa
- Class: Euglenida
- Clade: Euglenophyceae
- Subclass: Euglenophycidae
- Order: Eutreptiales; Leedale, 1967 emend. Marin & Melkonian, 2003
- Family: Eutreptiaceae; Hollande, 1942

Type genus
- Eutreptia Perty, 1852

Genera
- Eutreptia; Eutreptiella

= Eutreptiaceae =

Family of algae

Eutreptiaceae (ICN) or Eutreptiidae (ICZN) is a family of algae in the class Euglenophyceae. It is the only family within the monotypic order Eutreptiales (ICN) or Eutreptiida (ICZN). It contains predominantly marine single-celled flagellates with photosynthetic chloroplasts.

== Description ==
Members of the family Eutreptiaceae are unicellular flagellates, microscopic eukaryotes or protists capable of swimming by using flagella. Each individual has two or four heterodynamic flagella, of equal or unequal length, emerging from a pocket in the anterior side of the cell. The cells are usually capable of extensive flexibility or metaboly, a characteristic of all spirocute euglenids. Every species of this family is phototrophic and found primarily in marine or brackish habitats, rarely in freshwater ecosystems.
