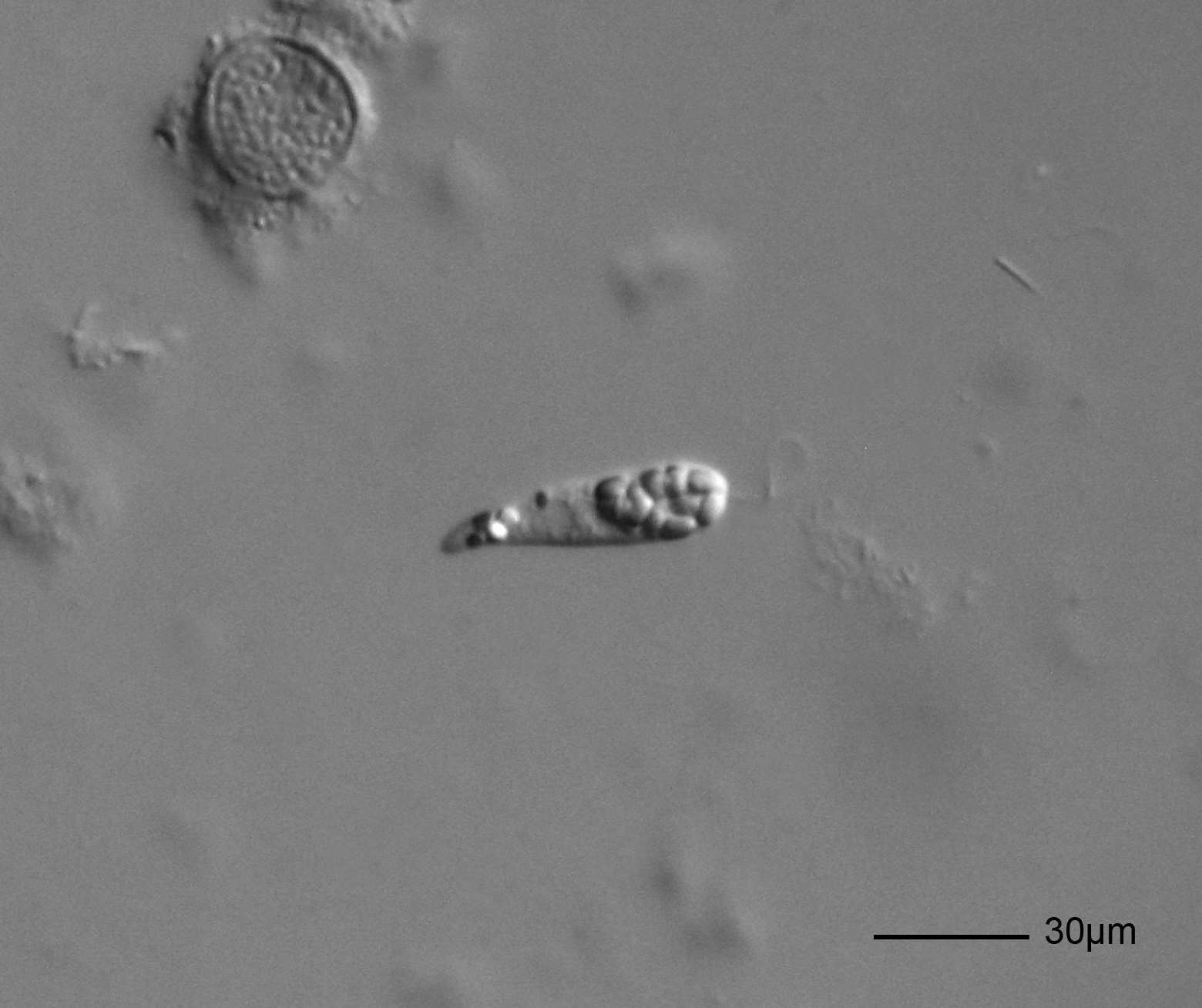
- Astasia kathemerios

Scientific classification
- Domain: Eukaryota
- (unranked): incertae sedis
- Clade: Discoba
- Phylum: Euglenozoa
- Class: Euglenida
- Clade: Anisonemia
- Order: Natomonadida; Cavalier-Smith 2016

Subgroups
- Aphagea; Neometanema

= Natomonadida =

Order of flagellates

Natomonadida is an order of euglenids, free-living flagellates. It contains a group of osmotrophs, the Aphagea, which have lost the ability to ingest food, as well as one genus of phagotrophs, Neometanema. Members of this order move primarily by swimming freely, although some species of aphageans perform a gliding motility.
