= Lac de Tavaneuse =

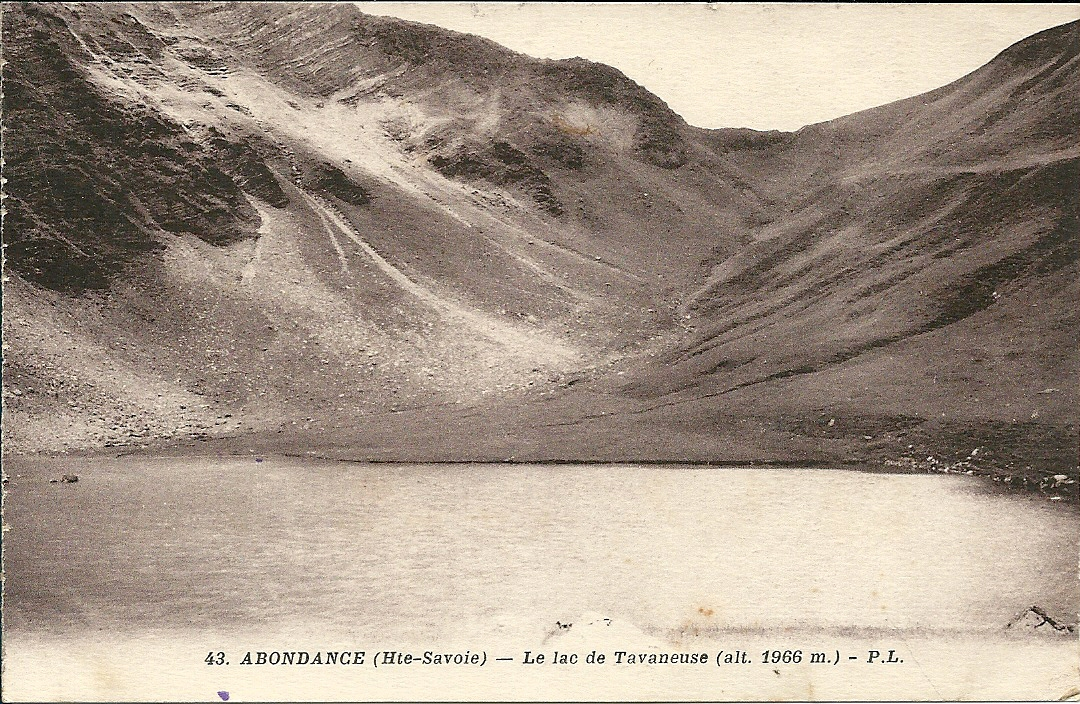
- Abondance (Haute-Savoie) - Lake Tavaneuse - around 1935

- Location within France
- Location: Abondance, Haute-Savoie
- Coordinates: 46.235°N 6.72°E
- Basin countries: France
- Max. length: 250 m (820 ft)
- Max. width: 150 m (490 ft)
- Surface area: 2.1 ha (5.2 acres)
- Average depth: 5.9 m (19 ft)
- Surface elevation: 1,805 m (5,922 ft)
- Islands: 1

Lac de Tavaneuse (French pronunciation: [lak də tavanøz]) is a lake at Abondance in Haute-Savoie, France. Positioned at an elevation of approximately 1,805 meters, within the region Chablais Massif. Hiking routes to the lake often begin from Prétairié, with trails passing through meadows, forests, and waterfalls.
