= Chelandion =

Byzantine galley warship

Chelandion (Greek: χελάνδιον) was a Byzantine galley warship, a variant of the dromōn that also functioned as a cargo transport.

The term chelandion is derived from the Greek word kelēs, "courser", and first appeared during the early 8th century. In the medieval Latin used in Western Europe, it was rendered chelandium or scelandrium (and thence the 12th-century sandanum transport), while the Arabs rendered the name as shalandī (plural shalandiyyāt) and used it for a probably similar type of vessels in their own navies.

In common with the general characteristics of the dromōn type, the chelandion was a bireme galley, i.e. with two rows of oars, which provided its main means of propulsion, although it also featured one or two lateen sails, and was steered by two quarter rudders at the stern. It could also be equipped with siphons for projecting the feared Greek fire, the Byzantine navy's secret incendiary weapon.

The term chelandion is usually used interchangeably with dromōn in medieval literary sources, leading to much confusion as to the exact nature of the ship and its differences with the dromōn proper. It appears, however, that the type originated as a horse-transport (hippagōgon). This in turn implies some differences in construction from the standard dromōn: at the very least, the presence of a special compartment running the length of the vessel amidships to accommodate a row of horses would increase its beam and hold depth.

In the 10th century, chelandia formed the bulk of the Byzantine navy, serving in two types: the chelandion ousiakon (χελάνδιον οὑσιακόν) or simply ousiakon or ousiakos, so named because it was manned by an ousia of 108 men, and the chelandion pamphylon (Greek: χελάνδιον πάμφυλον), or simply pamphylon or pamphylos, crewed with up to 120–160 men, its name either implying an origin in the region of Pamphylia as a transport ship or its crewing with "picked crews" (from πᾶν + φῦλον, "all tribes").

== Sources ==
- Pryor, John H.; Jeffreys, Elizabeth M. (2006). The Age of the ΔΡΟΜΩΝ: The Byzantine Navy ca. 500–1204. Leiden, The Netherlands and Boston, Massachusetts: Brill Academic Publishers. ISBN 978-90-04-15197-0.
