= Dinema (protist) =

Scientific classification
- Domain: Eukaryota
- Clade: Discoba
- Phylum: Euglenozoa
- Class: Euglenida
- Order: Anisonemida
- Family: Anisonemidae
- Genus: Dinema; Perty, 1852

Species
- See text.

Synonyms
- Dinematomonas P.C.Silva, 1960

Genus of flagellates

Dinema, synonym Dinematomonas, is a genus of flagellated algae in the phylum Euglenozoa.

== Description ==
Like other members of the family Anisonemidae, Dinema consists of single-celled organisms with a larger posterior flagellum by means of which they are able to glide. They are phagotrophic, meaning that they feed by engulfing particles of food, and are non-photosynthetic.

== Taxonomy ==
The genus Dinema was established by Perty in 1852, and is valid under the International Code of Zoological Nomenclature. However, due to the earlier description of the orchid genus Dinema, it is an illegitimate name under the International Code of Nomenclature for algae, fungi, and plants. As a result, Paul C. Silva Other sources use the genus name Dinematomonas P.C.Silva. Dinema is an acceptable name under the International Code of Zoological Nomenclature.

Dinema is probably paraphyletic with respect to Anisonema.

=== Species ===
The genus Dinema contains eight species:

- Dinema australiense Mikhailov
- Dinema dimorphum (Skuja) Schroeckh, W.J.Lee & D.J.Patterson
- Dinema griseolum Perty
- Dinema inaequale J.Larsen & D.J.Patterson
- Dinema litorale Skuja
- Dinema maculatum J.Larsen & D.J.Patterson
- Dinema platysomum (Skuja) W.J.Lee & D.J.Patterson
- Dinema validum J.Larsen & D.J.Patterson
