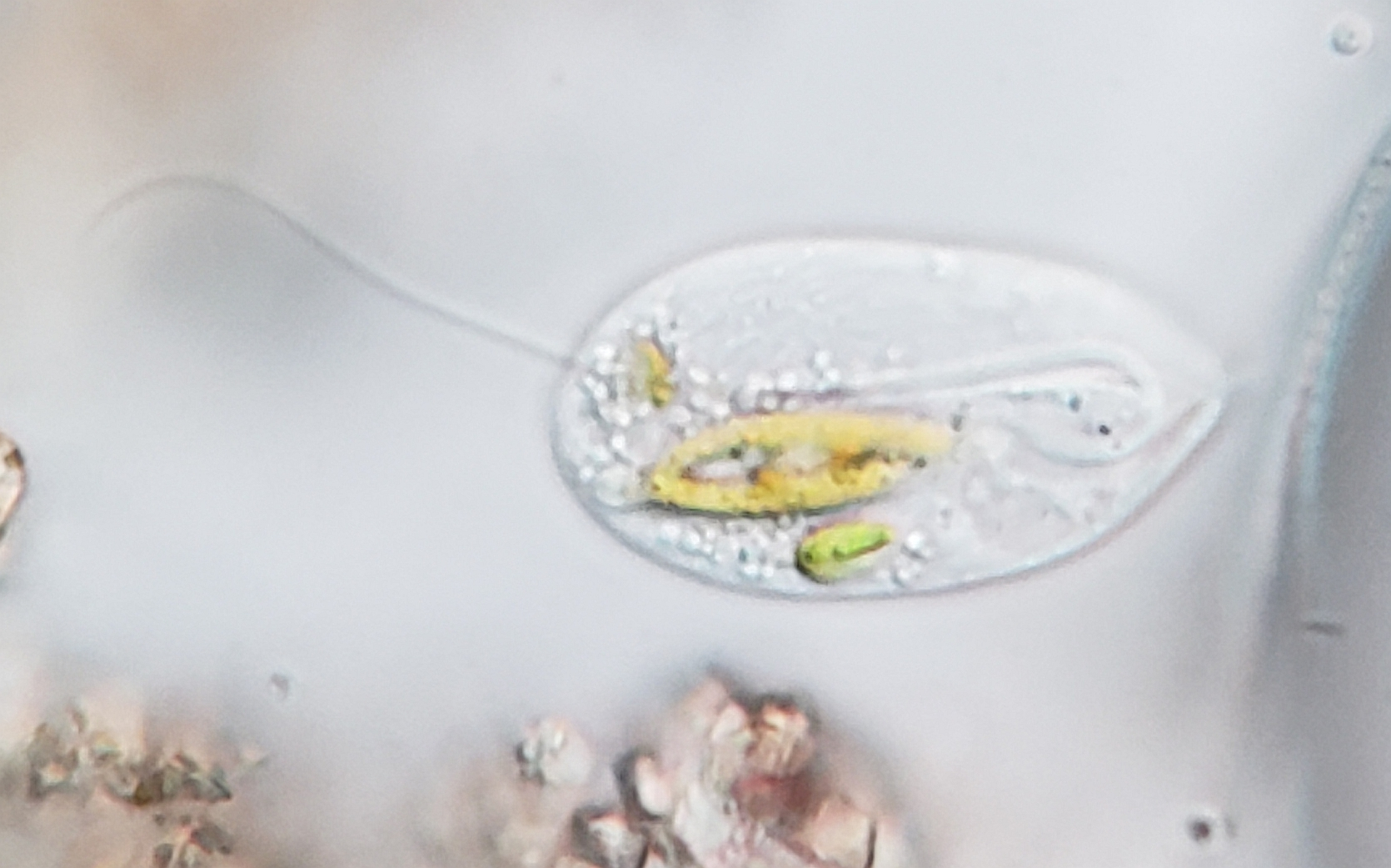
- Anisonema acinus

Scientific classification
- Domain: Eukaryota
- Clade: Discoba
- Phylum: Euglenozoa
- Class: Euglenida
- Clade: Anisonemia
- Order: Anisonemida; Cavalier-Smith, 2016
- Family: Anisonemidae; Saville Kent, 1880

Type genus
- Anisonema Dujardin, 1841

Genera
- Anisonema; Dinema

= Anisonemidae =

Family of euglenid algae

Anisonemidae is a small family of euglenid algae, with two accepted genera. It is the only family in the order Anisonemida.

== Description ==
The family consists of single-celled organisms with a larger posterior flagellum by means of which they are able to glide. They are phagotrophic, meaning that they feed by engulfing particles of food, and are non-photosynthetic.

== Taxonomy ==
The family was established by William Saville-Kent in a work published in 1880–1881. Saville-Kent used a much wider circumscription than more recent sources. Historically, phagotrophic euglenids have been treated as animals, and named under the International Code of Zoological Nomenclature, hence the family name ending "-idae".

=== Genera ===
As of May 2023, two genera are accepted:

- Anisonema Dujardin, 1841
- Dinema Perty, 1852 (syn. Dinematomonas P.C.Silva, 1960)

A third genus, Heteronema Dujardin, 1841, is listed by some sources. The status of the genus is unclear; it appears to be polyphyletic, with some species falling into the order Peranemida and others in Anisonemida. Many of its species have been transferred into Teloprocta, which is placed in Peranemida.
