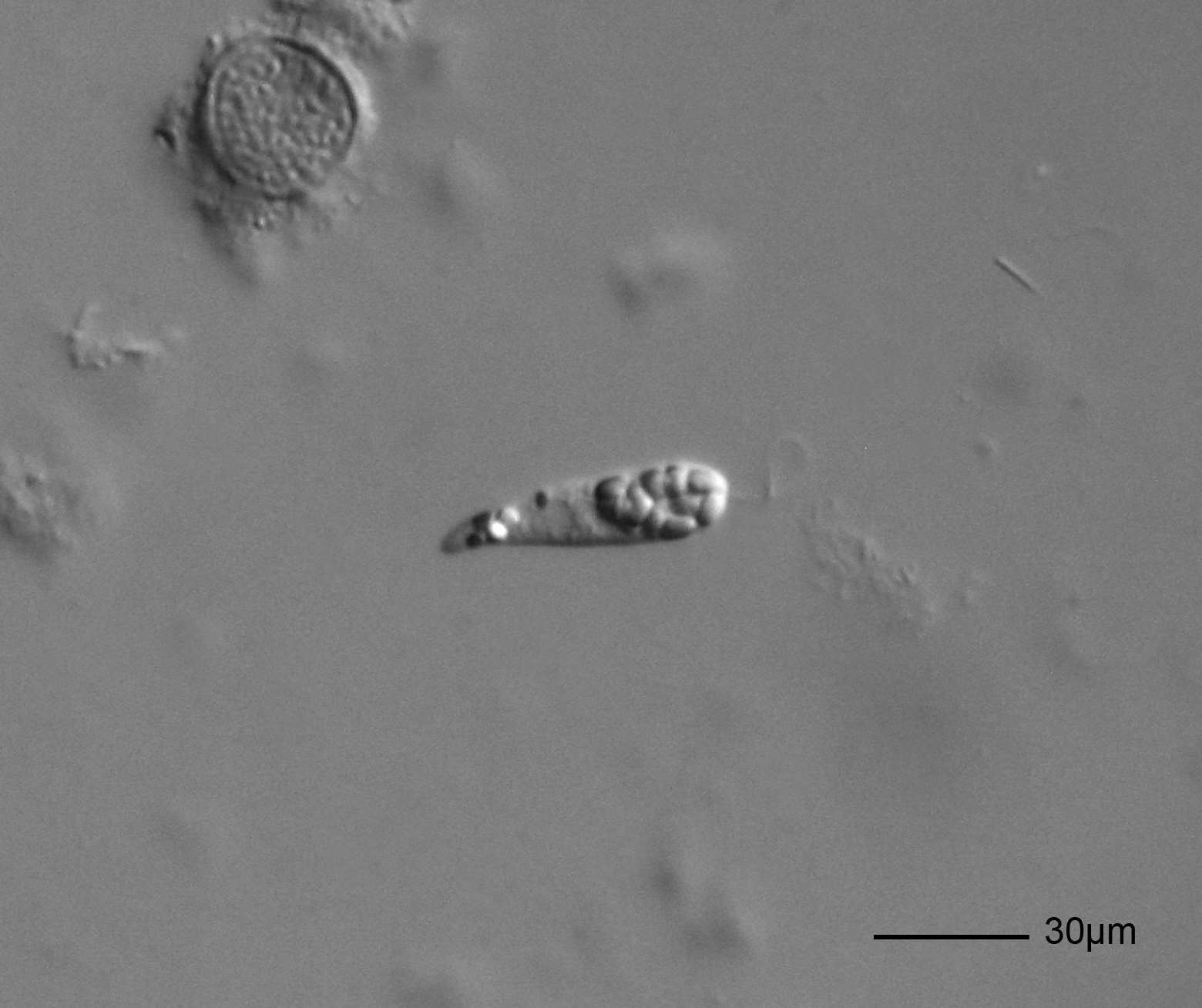
- Astasia kathemerios

Scientific classification
- Domain: Eukaryota
- Clade: Discoba
- Phylum: Euglenozoa
- Class: Euglenida
- Order: Natomonadida
- Clade: Aphagea; Cavalier-Smith 1993 emend. Busse & Preisfeld 2003

Genera
- Distigmidae; Distigma; Astasiidae; Astasia; Gyropaigne; Menoidium; Parmidium; Rhabdomonas

Synonyms
- Rhabdomonadina Leedale, 1967 emend. Cavalier-Smith, 1993

= Aphagea =

Group of osmotrophic flagellates

Aphagea is a group of obligate osmotrophic protists. They are euglenids, flagellates with two flagella and a relatively flexible cell shape underlined with protein strips. Unlike other euglenids, they feed only by osmotrophy, and lack any specialized structure for ingestion. Their closest living relative is Neometanema, a genus of phagotrophic (ingestion-feeding) euglenids, together forming the taxon Natomonadida.
