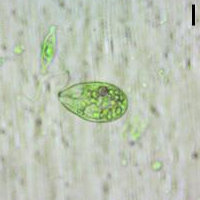
- Petalomonas mediocannellata var. disomata. Scale bar: 10 μm.

Scientific classification
- Domain: Eukaryota
- Supergroup: Discoba
- Phylum: Euglenozoa
- Class: Euglenida
- Order: Petalomonadida; Cavalier-Smith 1993

Type genus
- Petalomonas Stein, 1859

Families
- Scytomonadidae; Sphenomonadidae

= Petalomonadida =

Order of protozoa

Petalomonadida is an order of euglenids, single-celled eukaryotes with one or two flagella and a pellicle of proteinaceous strips. They use their longer anterior flagellum for gliding along the surface. They are one of the most abundant groups of phagotrophic euglenids. They are classified in two families, Scytomonadidae and Sphenomonadidae.
