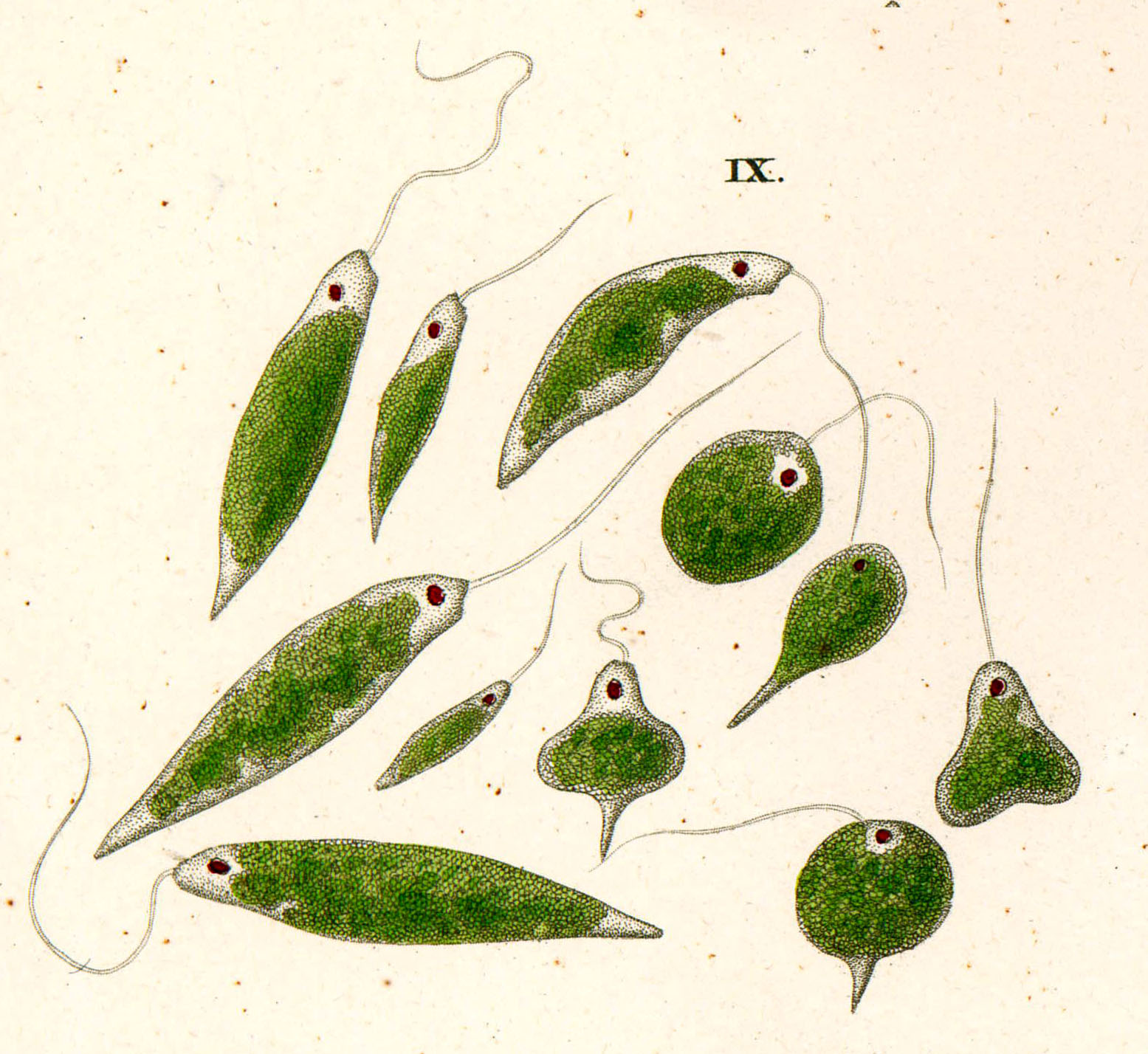
- Euglena viridis, by Ehrenberg

Scientific classification
- Domain: Eukaryota
- Clade: Discoba
- Phylum: Euglenozoa
- Class: Euglenida; Butschli 1884, emend. Simpson 1997

Subgroups
- Petalomonadida; Alistosa; Karavia; Olkaspira; Olkasia; Chelandium; Spirocuta; Anisonemia; Peranemida; Euglenophyceae; Teloprocta; Entosiphon; †Moyeria; And see text

Synonyms
- Euglenoidina Bütschli, 1884, Blochmann, 1886; Euglenoidea Lankester, 1885; Euglenoida Cavalier-Smith, 1993

= Euglenid =

Euglenid Temporal range: Middle Ordovician–Present

Class of protozoans

Euglenids or euglenoids are one of the best-known groups of eukaryotic flagellates: single-celled organisms with flagella, or whip-like tails. They are classified in the phylum Euglenozoa, class Euglenida or Euglenoidea. Euglenids are commonly found in fresh water, especially when it is rich in organic materials, but they have a few marine and endosymbiotic members. Many euglenids feed by phagocytosis, or strictly by diffusion. A monophyletic subgroup known as Euglenophyceae have chloroplasts and produce their own food through photosynthesis. This group contains the carbohydrate paramylon.

Euglenids split from other Euglenozoa (a larger group of flagellates) more than a billion years ago. The plastids (membranous organelles) in all extant photosynthetic species result from secondary endosymbiosis between a euglenid and a green alga.

== Structure ==
Euglenoids are distinguished mainly by the presence of a type of cell covering called a pellicle. Within its taxon, the pellicle is one of the euglenoids' most diverse morphological features. The pellicle is composed of proteinaceous strips underneath the cell membrane, supported by dorsal and ventral microtubules. This varies from rigid to flexible, and gives the cell its shape, often giving it distinctive striations. In many euglenids, the strips can slide past one another, causing an inching motion called metaboly. Otherwise, they move using their flagella.

Euglenid Body Plan: 1. Dorsal flagellum; 2. Axoneme; 3. Paraflagellar rod; 4. Mastigonemes, "hairs" attached to flagellum; 5. Flagellar pocket vestibulum; 6. Feeding apparatus; 7. Paraxial swelling; 8. Eyespot, photoreceptor used to sense light direction and intensity; 9. Contractile vacuole, regulates the quantity of water inside a cell; 10. Ventral flagellum; 11. Ventral root; 12. Golgi apparatus; modifies proteins and sends them out of the cell; 13. Endoplasmic reticulum, the transport network for molecules going to specific parts of the cell; 14. Phagosome; 15. Lysosome, holds enzymes; 16. Nucleus; 17. Nucleolus; 18. Plastid membranes (3, secondary); 19. Thylakoids, site of the light-dependent reactions of photosynthesis; 20. Pyrenoid, center of carbon fixation; 21. Paramylon granules; 22. Pellicular strip; 23. Muciferous body; 24. Mitochondrion, creates ATP (energy) for the cell (discoid cristae)

== Classification ==
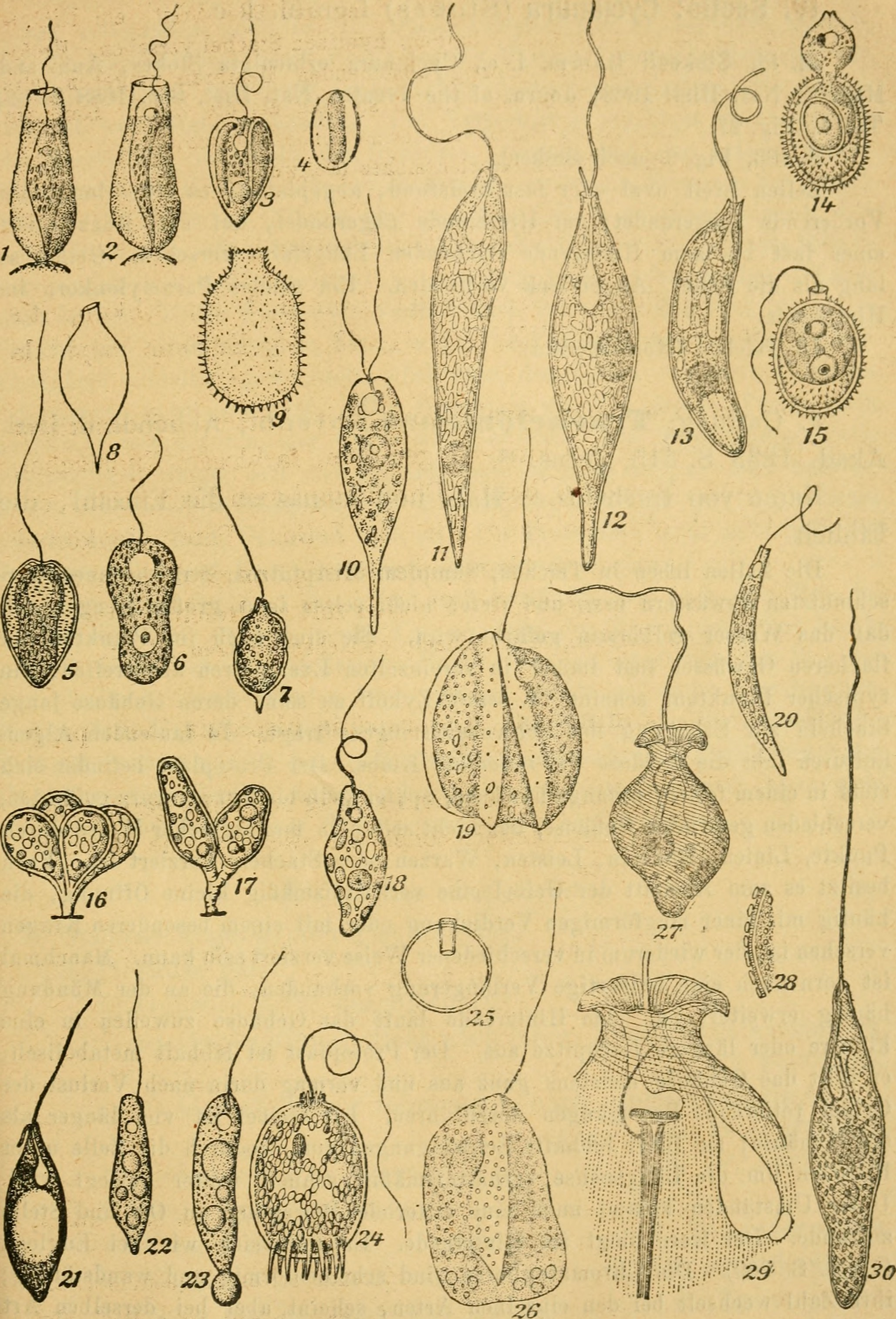
Examples of euglenid diversity. 1—2. Ascoglena sp. (Euglenales); 3–4. Cryptoglena sp. (idem); 5–9, 14–15, 24–25, 27–29. Trachelomonas spp. (id.); 10. Eutreptia sp. (Eutreptiales); 11, 20. Astasia spp. (Euglenales); 12. Distigma sp. (Eutreptiales); 13. Menoid[i]um sp. (Rhabdomonadales); 16–18. Colacium sp. (Euglenales); 19, 26. Petalomonas spp. (Sphenomonadales); 21. Sphenomonas sp. (id.); 22–23. Euglenopsis sp. (Euglenales); 30. Peranema sp. (Heteronematales)

The first attempt at classifying euglenids was done by Ehrenberg in 1830, when he described the genus Euglena and placed it in the Polygastrica of family Astasiae, containing other creatures of variable body shape and lacking pseudopods or lorica. Later, various biologists described additional characteristics for Euglena and established different classification systems for euglenids based on nutrition modes, the presence and number of flagella, and the degree of metaboly. The 1942 revision by A. Hollande distinguished three groups, Peranemoidées (flexible phagotrophs), Petalomonadinées (rigid phagotrophs) and Euglenidinées (phototrophs), and was widely accepted as the best reflection of the natural relationships between euglenids, adopted by many other authors. Gordon F. Leedale expanded on Hollande's system, establishing six orders (Eutreptiales, Euglenales, Rhabdomonadales, Sphenomonadales, Heteronematales and Euglenamorphales) and taking into account new data on their physiology and ultrastructure. This scheme endured until 1986, with the sequencing of the SSU rRNA gene from Euglena gracilis.

Euglenids are currently regarded as a highly diverse clade within Euglenozoa, in the eukaryotic supergroup Discoba. They are traditionally organized into three categories based on modes of nutrition: the phototrophs (Euglenophyceae), the osmotrophs (mainly the 'primary osmotrophs' known as Aphagea), and the phagotrophs, from which the first two groups have evolved. The phagotrophs, although paraphyletic, have historically been classified under the name of Heteronematina.

In addition, euglenids can be divided into inflexible or rigid euglenids, and flexible or metabolic euglenids which are capable of 'metaboly' or 'euglenid motion'. Only those with more than 18 protein strips in their pellicle gain this flexibility. Phylogenetic studies show that various clades of rigid phagotrophic euglenids compose the base of the euglenid tree, namely Petalomonadida and the paraphyletic 'Ploeotiida'. In contrast, all flexible euglenids belong to a monophyletic group known as Spirocuta, which includes Euglenophyceae, Aphagea and various phagotrophs (Peranemidae, Anisonemidae and Neometanemidae). The current classification of class Euglenida, as a result of these studies, is as follows:

- Euglenida incertae sedis: Atraktomonas, Calycimonas, Dylakosoma, Entosiphon Tropidoscyphus, Michajlowastasia, Parastasiella, Dinemula, Paradinemula, Mononema, Ovicola, Naupliicola, Embryocola, Copromonas, Gaulosia.
- Order Petalomonadida Cavalier-Smith 1993
- Clade Alistosa Lax & Simpson 2021
- Clade Karavia Lax, Cho & Keeling 2023
- Clade Olkaspira Lax & Simpson 2020
  - Olkasia Lax, Lee, Eglit & Simpson 2019
  - Chelandium Lax, Cho & Keeling 2023
  - Clade Spirocuta Cavalier-Smith 2016 [Helicales Perschke et al. 2017]
    - Clade Anisonemia Cavalier-Smith 2016
      - Order Anisonemida Cavalier-Smith 2016
        - Family Anisonemidae Kent 1880 emend. Cavalier-Smith 2016
      - Order Natomonadida Cavalier-Smith 2016
        - Suborder Metanemina Cavalier-Smith 2016
          - Family Neometanemidae Cavalier-Smith 2016
        - Clade Aphagea Cavalier-Smith 1993 emend. Busse & Preisfeld 2003 [Rhabdomonadina Leedale 1967 emend. Cavalier-Smith 1993]
          - Family Astasiidae Kent 1884
          - Family Distigmidae Hollande 1942
    - Order Peranemida Bütschli 1884
      - Family Peranemidae Bütschli 1884
    - Clade Euglenophyceae Schoenichen 1925, emend. Marin & Melkonian 2003 [Euglenea Butschli 1884, emend. Busse & Preisfeld 2002]
      - Euglenophyceae incertae sedis: Ascoglena, Euglenamorpha, Euglenopsis, Glenoclosteroium, Hegneria, Klebsina, Euglenocapsa.
      - Order Rapazida Cavalier-Smith 2016
        - Family Rapazidae Cavalier-Smith 2016
      - Subclass Euglenophycidae Busse & Preisfeld 2003
        - Order Eutreptiales Leedale 1967, emend. Marin & Melkonian 2003
          - Family Eutreptiaceae Hollande 1942
        - Order Euglenales Leedale 1967, emend. Marin & Melkonian 2003
          - Family Phacaceae Kim et al. 2010
          - Family Euglenaceae Dujardin 1841, emend. Kim et al. 2010
    - Subclass Acroglissia Cavalier-Smith 2016
      - Order Acroglissida Cavalier-Smith 2016
        - Family Teloproctidae Cavalier-Smith in Cavalier-Smith et al. 2016
- Entosiphon Cavalier-Smith, Chao & Vickerman 2016
- †Moyeria Thusu 1973, emend. Miller & Eames 1982

== Nutrition ==
The classification of euglenids is still variable, as groups are being revised to conform with their molecular phylogeny. Classifications have fallen in line with the traditional groups based on differences in nutrition and number of flagella; these provide a starting point for considering euglenid diversity. Different characteristics of the euglenids' pellicles can provide insight into their modes of movement and nutrition.

As with other Euglenozoa, the primitive mode of nutrition is phagocytosis. Prey such as bacteria and smaller flagellates is ingested through a cytostome, supported by microtubules. These are often packed together to form two or more rods, which function in ingestion, and in Entosiphon form an extendable siphon. Most phagotrophic euglenids have two flagella, one leading and one trailing. The latter is used for gliding along the substrate. In some, such as Peranema, the leading flagellum is rigid and beats only at its tip.

=== Osmotrophic euglenoids ===
Osmotrophic euglenids are euglenids which have undergone osmotrophy.

Due to a lack of characteristics that are useful for taxonomical purposes, the origin of osmotrophic euglenids is unclear, though certain morphological characteristics reveal a small fraction of osmotrophic euglenids are derived from phototrophic and phagotrophic ancestors.

A prolonged absence of light or exposure to harmful chemicals may cause atrophy and absorption of the chloroplasts without otherwise harming the organism. A number of species exists where a chloroplast's absence was formerly marked with separate genera such as Astasia (colourless Euglena) and Hyalophacus (colourless Phacus). Due to the lack of a developed cytostome, these forms feed exclusively by osmotrophic absorption.

== Reproduction ==
Although euglenids share several common characteristics with animals, which is why they were originally classified as so, no evidence has been found of euglenids ever using sexual reproduction. This is one of the reasons they could no longer be classified as animals.

For euglenids to reproduce, asexual reproduction takes place in the form of binary fission, and the cells replicate and divide during mitosis and cytokinesis. This process occurs in a very distinct order. First, the basal bodies and flagella replicate, then the cytostome and microtubules (the feeding apparatus), and finally the nucleus and remaining cytoskeleton. Once this occurs, the organism begins to cleave at the basal bodies, and this cleavage line moves towards the center of the organism until two separate euglenids are evident. Because of the way that this reproduction takes place and the axis of separation, it is called longitudinal cell division or longitudinal binary fission.

== Evolution ==
The earliest fossil of euglenids is attributed to Moyeria, which is interpreted as possessing a pellicle composed of proteinaceous strips, the defining characteristic of euglenids. It is found in Middle Ordovician and Silurian rocks, making it the oldest fossil evidence of euglenids.

== Gallery ==
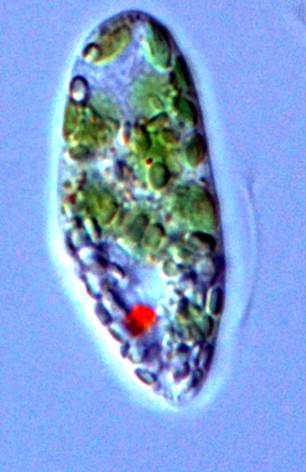
Euglena sp. (Euglenales)

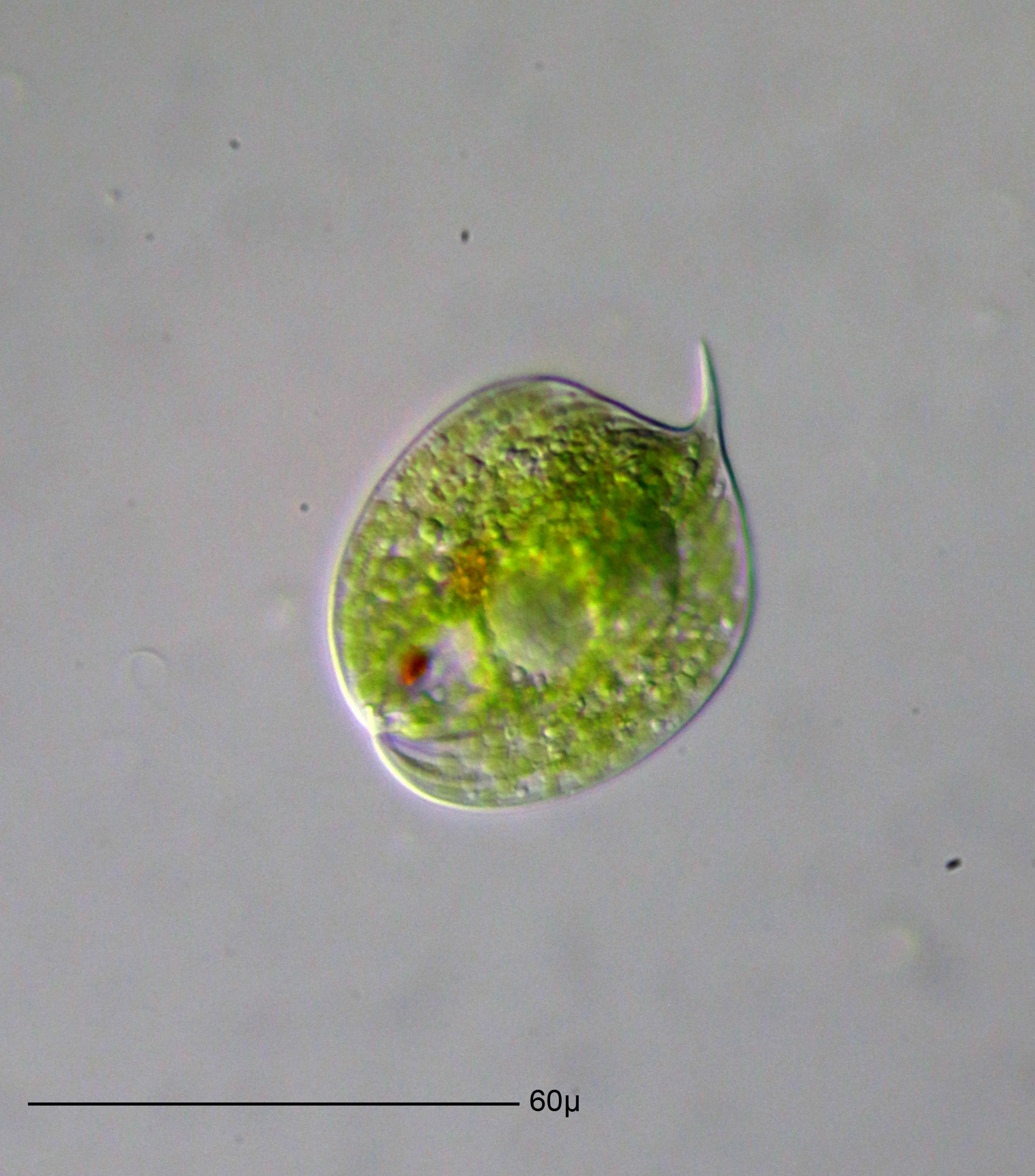
Phacus sp. (Euglenales)

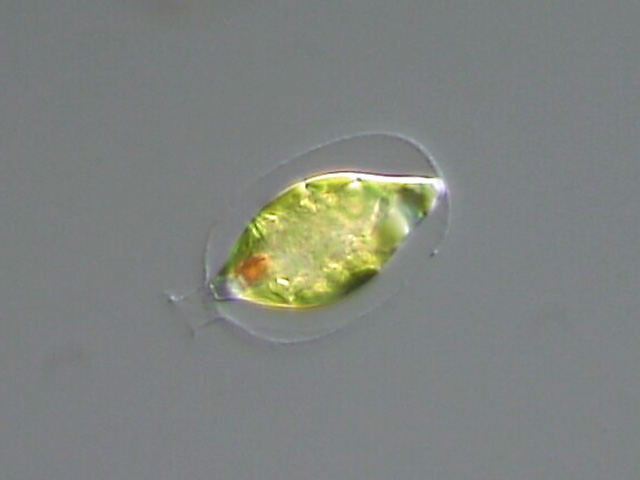
Trachelomonas sp. (Euglenales)

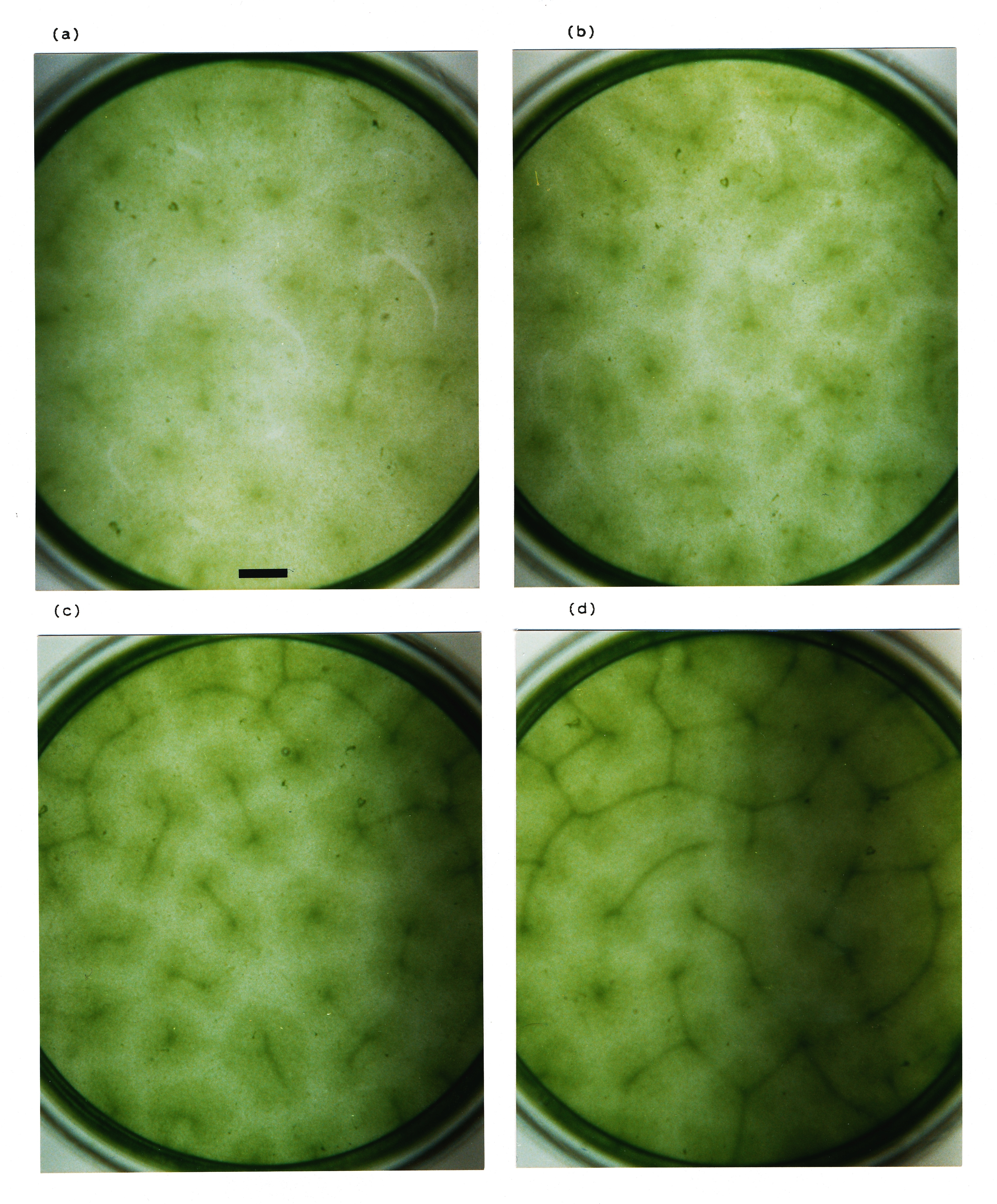
Euglenoid cultures in Petri dishes

Cell diagram

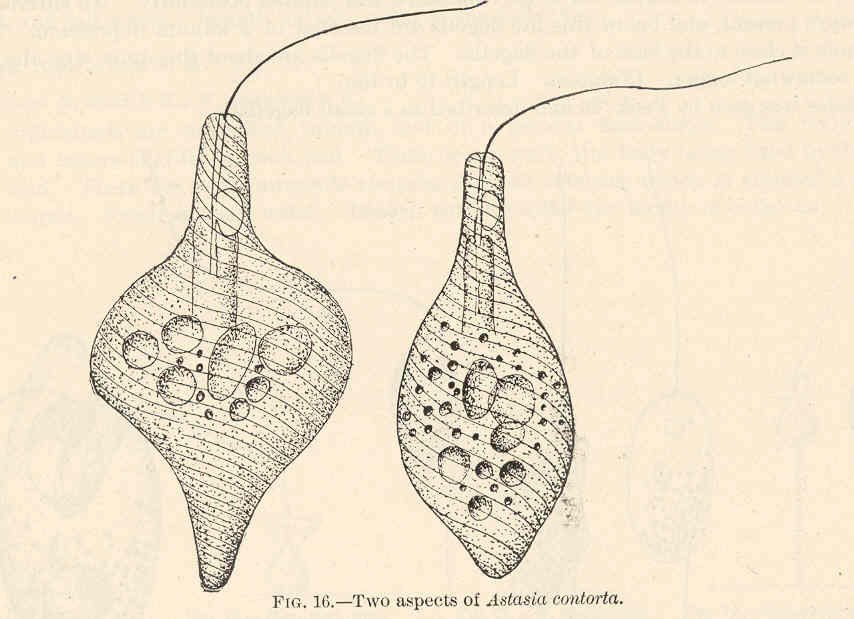
Astasia sp. (Euglenales)

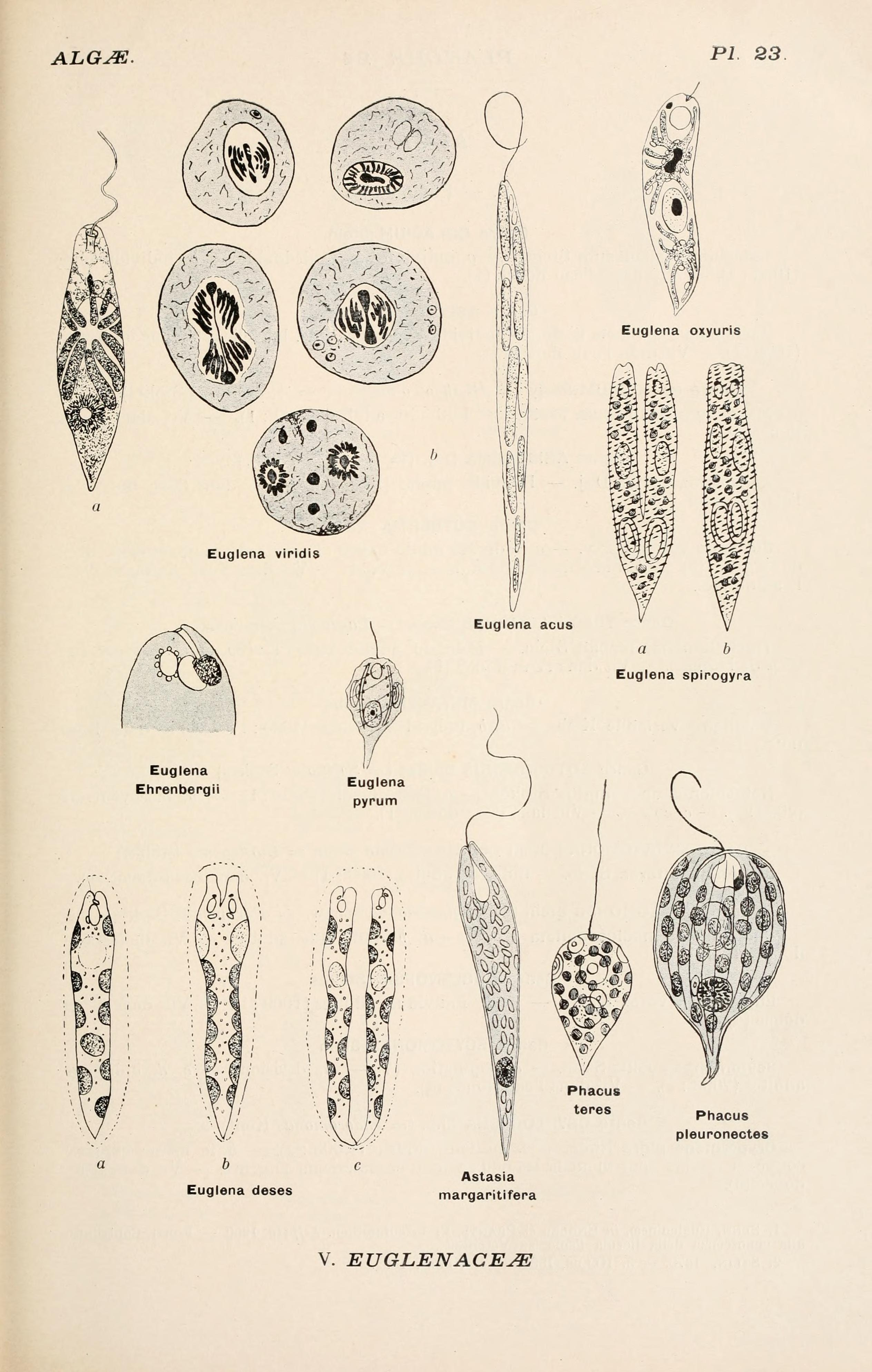
Euglena, Astasia and Phacus spp. (Euglenales)

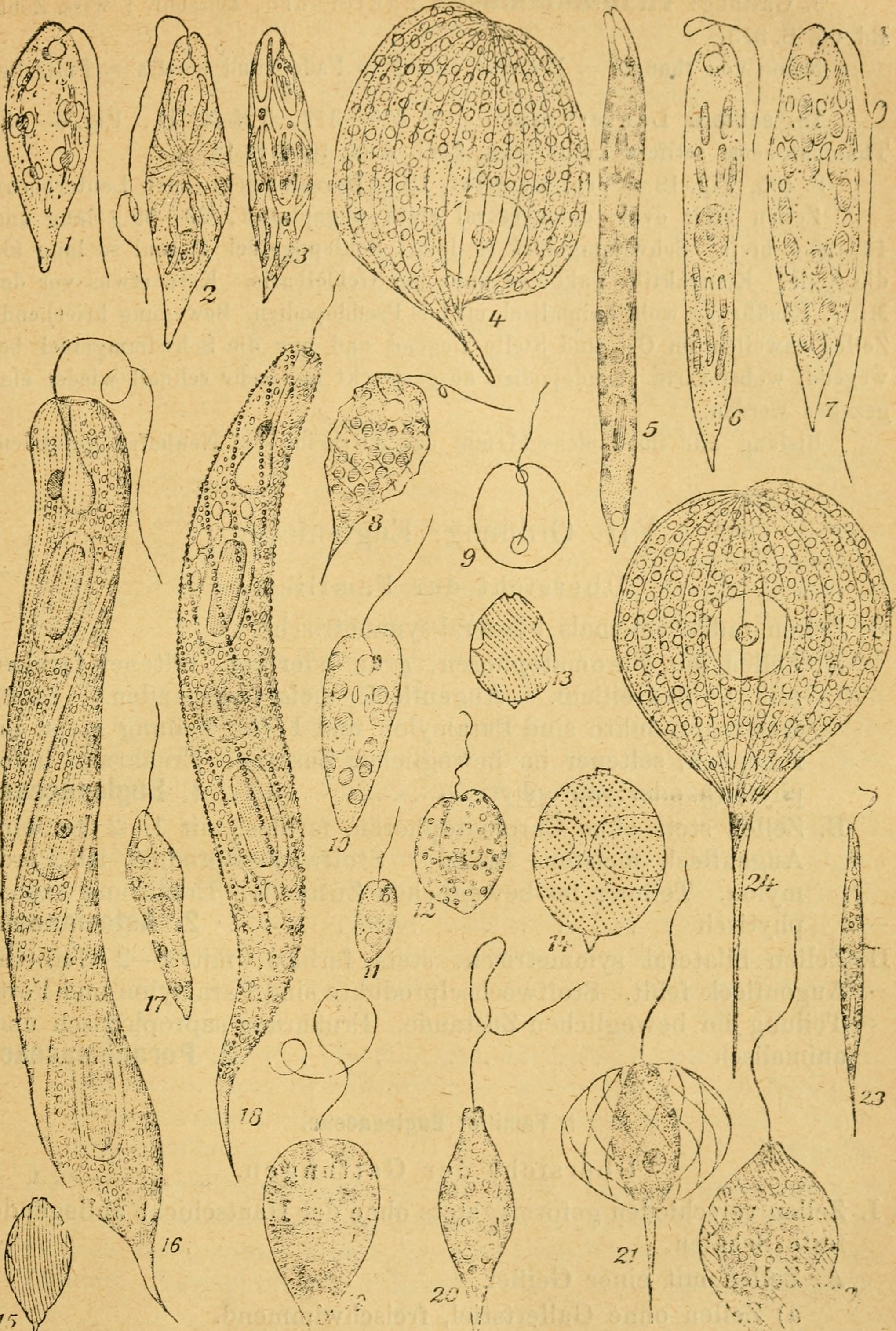
Euglena, Phacus and Lepocinclis spp. (Euglenales)

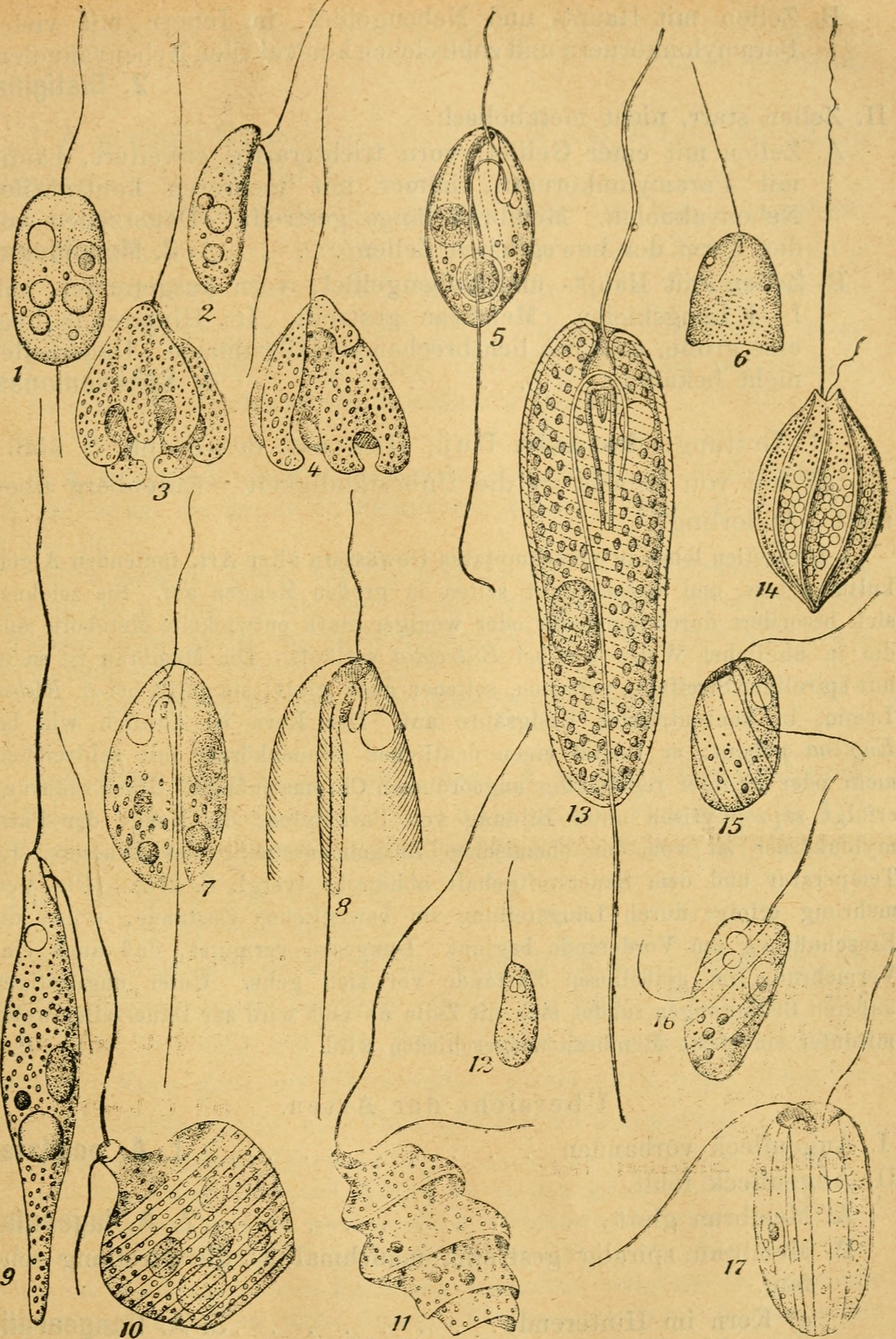
Anisonema, Petalomonas, Notosolenus, Scytomonas and Tropidoscyphus spp. (Sphenomonadales); Heteronema, Dinema and Entosiphon spp. (Heteronematales)

== Bibliography ==
- Ciugulea, I.; Triemer, R. E. (2010). A Color Atlas of Photosynthetic Euglenoids. East Lansing, MI: Michigan State University Press. ISBN 978-0-87013-879-9.
- Leander, B. S.; Triemer, R. E.; Farmer, M. A. (2001). "Character evolution in heterotrophic euglenids". European Journal of Protistology. 37 (3): 337–356. doi:10.1078/0932-4739-00842. S2CID 4181281.
- Leander, B.S.; Lax, G.; Karnkowska, A.; Simpson, A.G.B. (2017). "Euglenida". In Archibald, J.M.; Simpson, A.G.B.; Slamovits, C. (eds.). Handbook of the Protists. Springer. pp. 1–42. doi:10.1007/978-3-319-32669-6_13-1. ISBN 978-3-319-32669-6.
- Leedale, G. F. (1978). "Phylogenetic criteria in euglenoid flagellates". BioSystems. 10 (1–2): 183–187. Bibcode:1978BiSys..10..183L. doi:10.1016/0303-2647(78)90040-0. PMID 656566.
- Wołowski, K; Hindák, F (2005). Atlas of Euglenophytes. Krakow: VEDA Publishing House of the Slovak Academy of Sciences. ISBN 978-80-224-0836-3.
