= Osmotrophy =

Form of heterotrophic nutrition

Osmotrophy is a form of heterotrophic nutrition and a cellular feeding mechanism involving the direct absorption of dissolved organic compounds by osmosis. Organisms that use osmotrophy are called osmotrophs. Osmotrophy is used by diverse groups of organisms. Organisms that use osmotrophy include microorganisms like bacteria, many species of protists and most fungi. Invertebrate animal groups like molluscs, sponges, corals, brachiopods and echinoderms may use osmotrophic feeding as a supplemental food source. A common subset of osmotrophy is lysotrophy, in which organisms secrete enzymes into the extracellular environment to break down macromolecules into smaller, soluble molecules for absorption.

== Process ==
Osmotrophy, as a means of gathering nutrients in microscopic organisms, relies on the cellular surface area to ensure that proper diffusion of nutrients occurs in the cell. Some osmotrophs may have an internal digestive system, while still using osmosis as a way to gain supplemental nutrients. With bigger organisms, the surface-area-per-volume ratio drops and osmotrophy becomes insufficient to meet nutrient demands. Larger, macroscopic organisms that rely on osmotrophy, compensate with a very flat, thin body. A tapeworm is an example of such an adaptation.

The effectiveness of osmotrophy is largely dependent on environmental conditions. Depending on which nutrients are available, microbes can adjust their feeding strategies, producing specific proteins and transporters. These functions affect which microbes can thrive in certain environments and how they compete with one another. As a result, natural selection acts on these systems, shaping osmotrophic traits.

== Organisms that specialize in osmotrophy ==
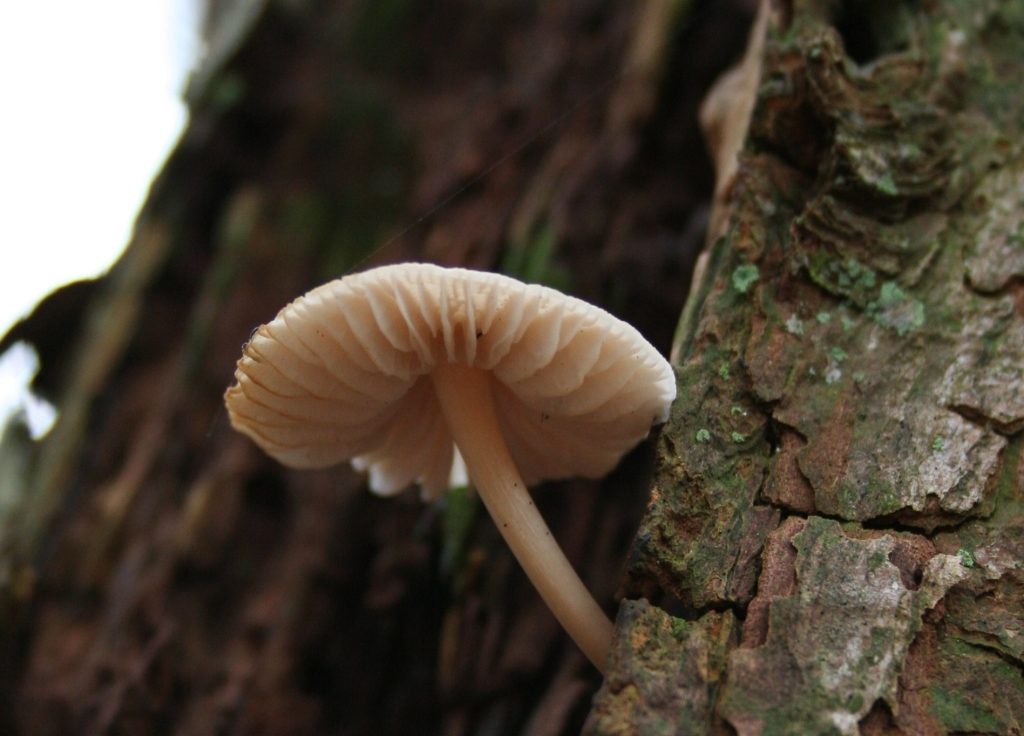
Fungi are a major group of osmotrophic organisms since Fungi degrade biomass.

Fungi are the main decomposers in land ecosystems that use osmotrophy to obtain their food. For organisms like fungi, osmotrophy facilitates the decomposition process. This is a result of the osmotrophy resulting in metabolites that continue growth.

Most microbes use osmotrophy as their main source of nutrition, while other organisms use a combination of phagotrophy (organisms internalize and digest particles/digest prey within the cell), phototrophy (using light energy to make sugar via photosynthesis), and osmotrophy.

== Mixotrophs ==
Some mixotrophic microorganisms use osmotrophy to acquire some of their energy. Mixotrophy is an organism's use of multiple forms of nutrition.

== See also ==
- Autotrophy
- Heterotrophy
- Mixotrophy
- Phagotrophy
- Phototrophy
