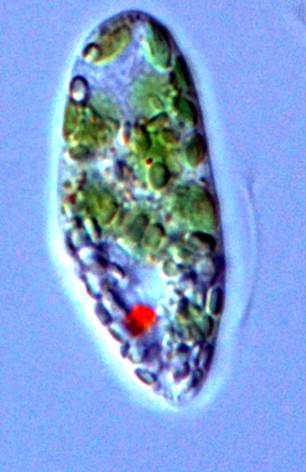

Scientific classification
- Domain: Eukaryota
- Clade: Discoba
- Phylum: Euglenozoa
- Class: Euglenida
- Clade: Euglenophyceae
- Order: Euglenales
- Family: Euglenaceae
- Genus: Euglena
- Species: E. gracilis

Binomial name
- Euglena gracilis Klebs, 1883

= Euglena gracilis =

Species of single-celled algae

Euglena gracilis is a freshwater species of euglenid, a microscopic type of algae, in the genus Euglena. It has secondary chloroplasts, and is a mixotroph able to feed by photosynthesis or phagocytosis. It has a highly flexible cell surface, allowing it to change shape from a thin cell up to 100 μm long to a sphere of approximately 20 μm. Each cell has two flagella, only one of which emerges from the flagellar pocket (reservoir) in the anterior of the cell, and can move by swimming, or by so-called "euglenoid" movement across surfaces. E. gracilis has been used extensively in the laboratory as a model organism, particularly for studying cell biology and biochemistry.

Other areas of their use include studies of photosynthesis, photoreception, and the relationship of molecular structure to the biological function of subcellular particles, among others. Euglena gracilis is the most studied member of the Euglenaceae.

E. gracilis was discovered as an effective bioindicator for phenol pollution in freshwater ecosystems and drainage. Their brief generating duration and particular biological reactions make it optimal for measuring phenol concentrations in the natural environment. The reported morphological abnormalities and unusual cell division reveal important information about the biological impacts of phenol on marine organisms. Using E. gracilis as a bioindicator can determine the level of phenol exposure in marine ecosystems and adopt appropriate mitigation actions to protect water quality and biodiversity.

== Taxonomy ==
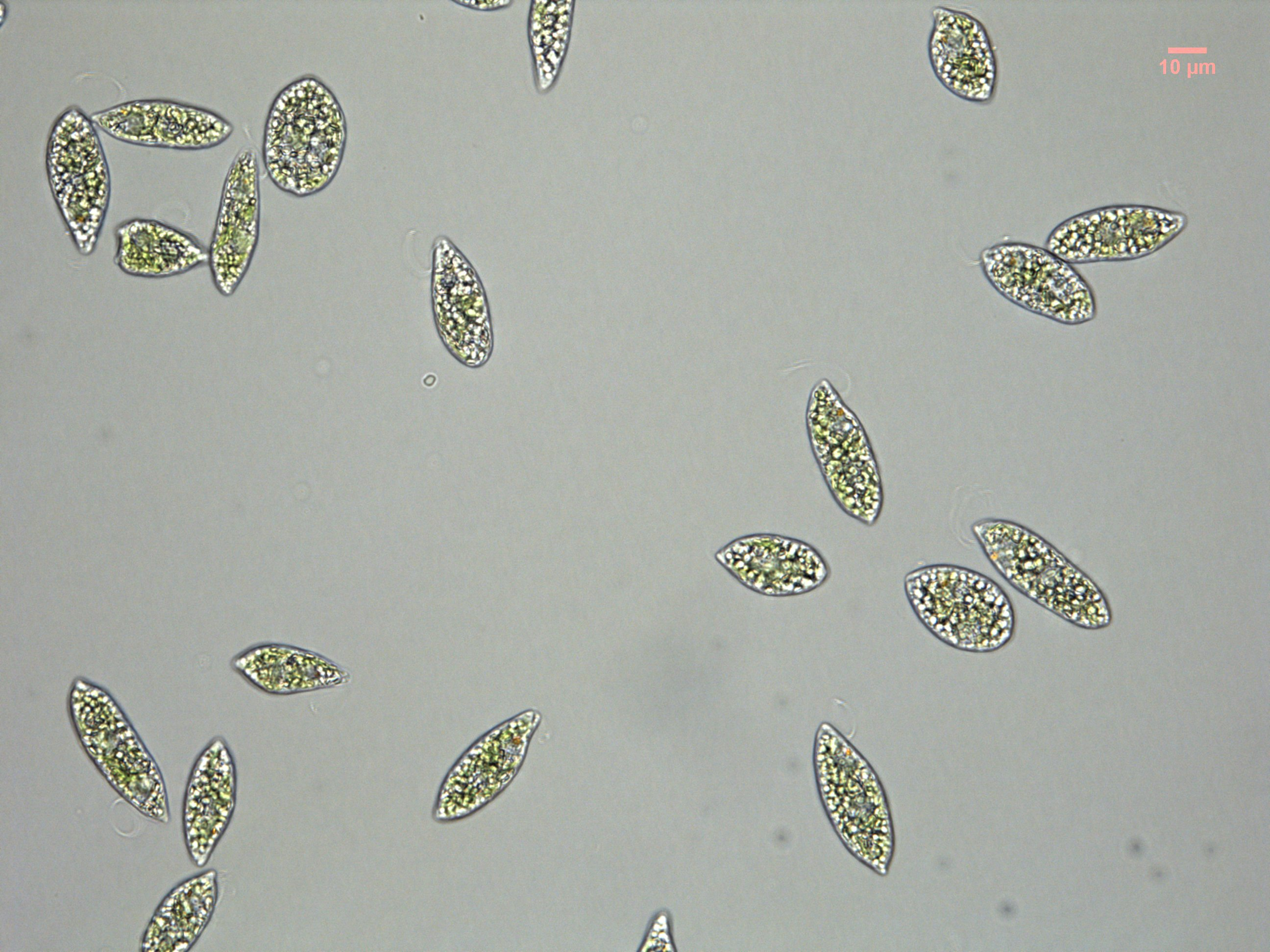
Euglena gracilis

A morphological and molecular study of the Euglenozoa put E. gracilis in close kinship with the species Khawkinea quartana, with Peranema trichophorum basal to both, although a later molecular analysis showed that E. gracilis was more closely related to Astasia longa than to certain other species recognized as Euglena.

The transcriptome of E. gracilis was sequenced, showing that E. gracilis has many unclassified genes which can make complex carbohydrates and natural products.

== Morphology ==
Euglena gracilis is a single-celled organism. It consists of cylindrical to spindle-shaped cells with a length ranging from 31 to 70 micrometers and a width of 6 to 22 μm. The anterior end is rounded, while the posterior end tapers to a blunt point. The cell contains is surrounded by a flexible outer covering called a pellicle, which made up of proteinaceous strips called pellicular strips. This pellicle provides shape and structure to the cell, and appears as very faint spiral striations in the microscope.

Euglena gracilis has 7 to 10 large chloroplasts which are disc- to lens-shaped; at the center of each chloroplast is a pyrenoid with two starch sheaths surrounding the pyrenoid (i.e. double-sheathed). The cell also has numerous round to ring-shaped paramylon grains. The emergent flagellum is about as long as the cell body, occasionally only half as long. There is a single prominent eyespot (stigma).

=== Anatomy ===
The movement of the E. gracilis is primarily achieved by its flagellum that emerges from a flagellar pocket. It has forward and backwards movement, as well as changes in its direction. Additionally, E. gracilis contains a light-sensitive eyespot, or stigma, which enables it to exhibit phototaxis by moving towards light sources for photosynthesis. The cell also possesses a contractile vacuole responsible for osmoregulation, helping maintain proper water balance within the cell.

The plastids contain three membranes. These membranes are an evolutionary vestige of the secondary endosymbiotic event that occurred between a phagotrophic eukaryovorous euglenid and a Pyramimonas-related green alga. The plastids of Euglena are unusual since most secondary plastids are surrounded by four envelopes. The two inner ones are derived from the inner and outer chloroplast envelopes of the primary plastid of the alga that was taken up during the symbiotic event. The two outermost are derived from the plasma membrane of the alga (third) and the phagosome of the host (fourth).

== Biochemistry ==
Paramylon is a unique storage polysaccharide found in euglenid, serving as a reserve carbohydrate for energy storage. Structurally, paramylon is a linear β-1,3-glucan, distinct from the storage polysaccharide starch of plants and some species of alga.

== Habitat and distribution ==
Euglena gracilis is commonly found in freshwater ponds and Sphagnum bogs with high amounts of nitrogenous matter. It may also be found in brackish water. It can be found in waters with very low pH or those that are heavily polluted, but appears to be less tolerant of high metal concentrations than the related Euglena mutabilis. It has a cosmopolitan distribution.

== Uses ==
Microalgae such as E. mutabilis are considered a possible source for biodiesel production due to their high lipid content. Its lipids may be suitable for biodiesel production due to their saturation, such as fatty acyl-CoA reductase and wax synthase. These ratios vary on environmental and cultivation conditions.

In industry, Euglena gracilis is genetically engineered to produce a flour used to manufacture various protein-rich, non-animal foods.
