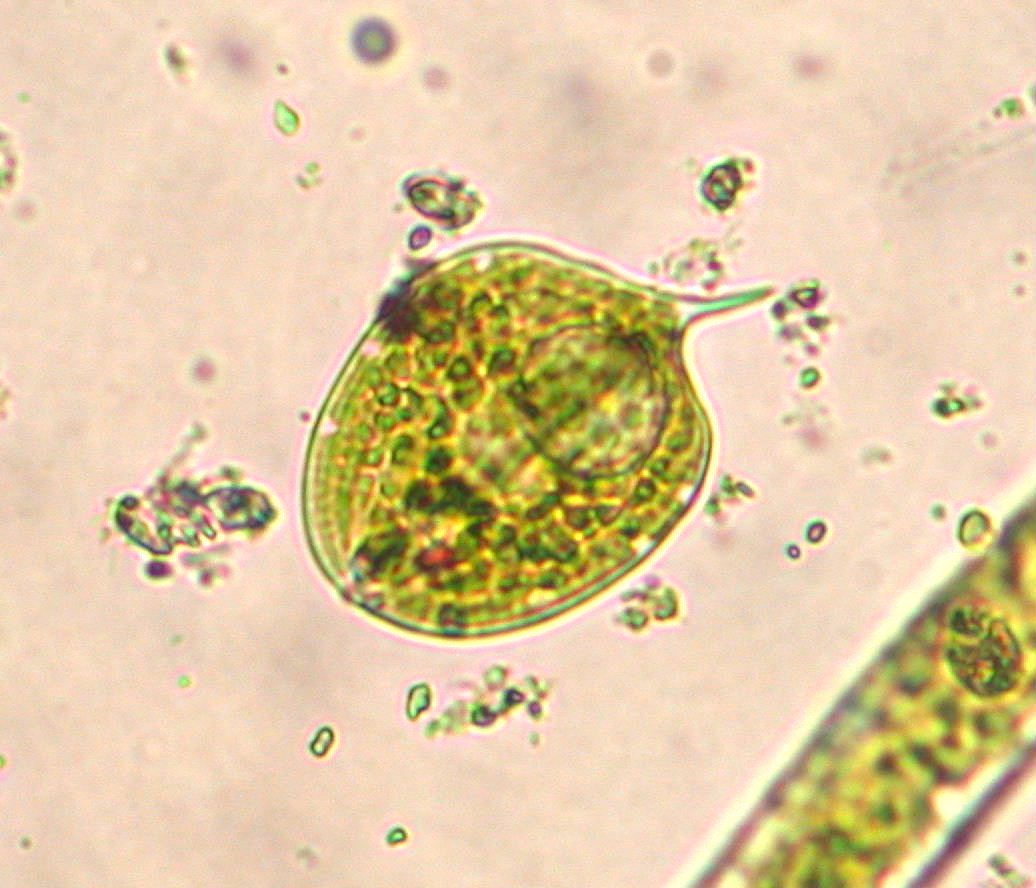
- Phacus sp.

Scientific classification
- Domain: Eukaryota
- Clade: Discoba
- Phylum: Euglenozoa
- Class: Euglenida
- Clade: Euglenophyceae
- Order: Euglenales
- Family: Phacaceae
- Genus: Phacus; Dujardin, 1841

Type species
- Phacus longicauda (Ehrenberg) Dujardin

= Phacus =

Genus of flagellate algae

Phacus is a genus of unicellular euglenoids, of the phylum Euglenozoa (also known as Euglenophyta), characterized by its flat, leaf-shaped structure, and rigid cytoskeleton known as a pellicle. These eukaryotes are mostly green in colour, and have a single flagellum that extends the length of their body. They are morphologically very flat, rigid, leaf-shaped, and contain many small discoid chloroplasts.

Phacus are commonly found in freshwater habitats around the globe and include several hundred species that continue to be discovered to this day. There are 564 species of Phacus in the database, but only 171 have been accepted taxonomically. It is a large and complex genus, with ongoing species revisions continuing to the present.

== Etymology ==
The genus name is believed to have originated from the Greek word φακός (phakós), meaning lentil or lens. This may be due to the general round or oval shape of the many species that are part of this genus. Its origins date back to the nineteenth century, in Germany, where it was first coined by Nitzsch and later formally established by Dujardin. The genus name is treated in literature as masculine.

== History of knowledge ==
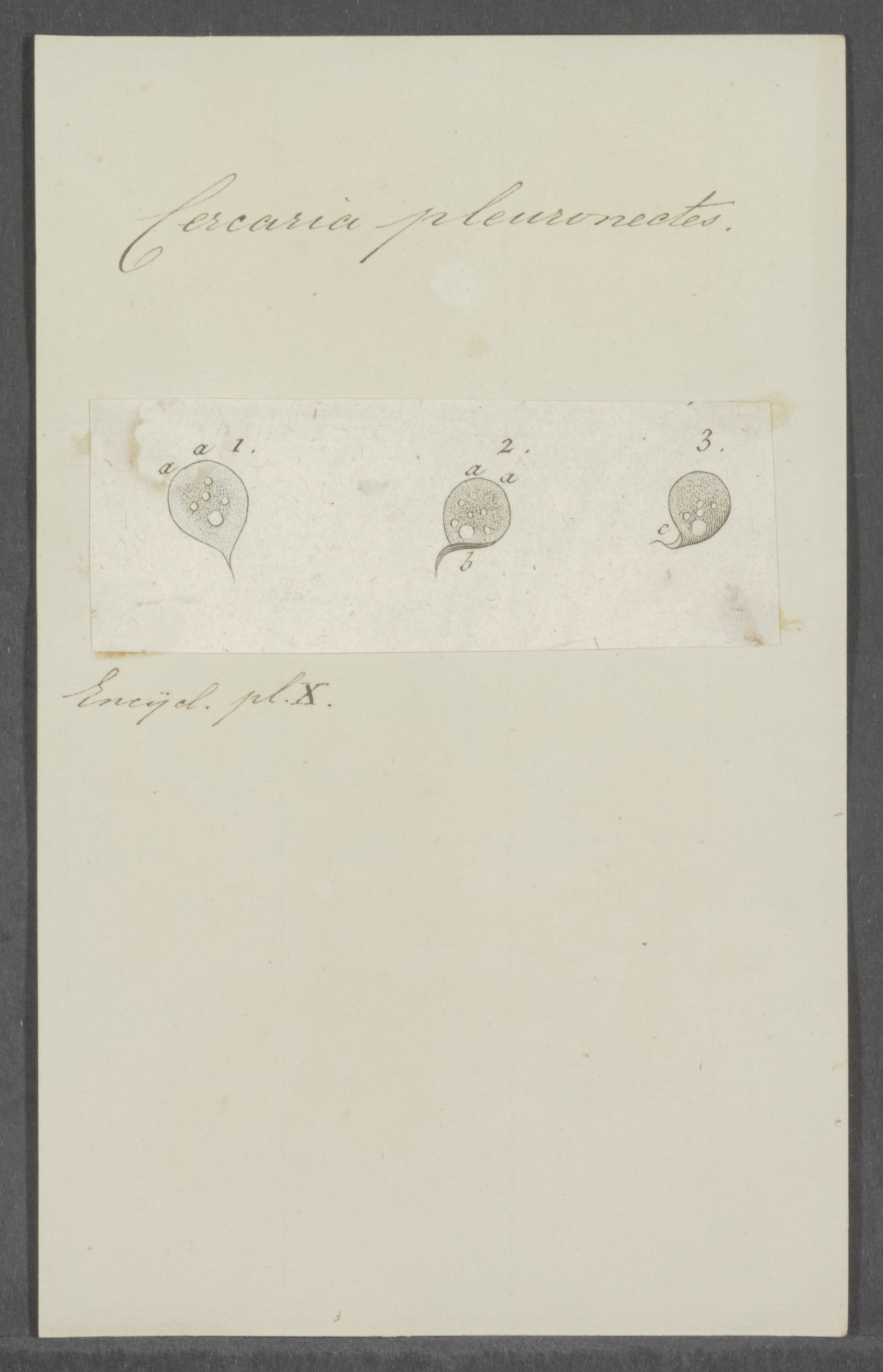
Drawings of Cercaria pleuronectes in the Iconographia Zoologica

Otto Friedrich Müller is credited to have first seen organisms matching Phacus, in 1773; he named his organism Cercaria pleuronectes and placed it in the genus Cercaria. However, Christian Ludwig Nitzsch in 1817 noted that his genus Cercaria was an artificial grouping of different organisms, and later in 1827 transferred the genus Cercaria pleuronectes to the genus Phacus. Earlier in 1823, Jean-Baptiste Bory de Saint-Vincent proposed the name Virgulina which technically had priority over the name Phacus. The name Virgulina was later rejected in favor of Phacus.

The genus in its modern sense was established by the French biologist Félix Dujardin in 1841, using Nitzsch's name. Dujardin first published collective findings of the genus in the scientific journal Histoire naturelle des Zoophytes, Infusoires in 1841, separating them from the genus Euglena. The reason behind the separation was in order to create a group that correctly organizes their established morphological characteristics such as their rigid, flat, leaf-shape and small discoid chloroplasts with absent pyrenoids.

Christian Ehrenberg was one of the first scientists to discover and classify members of the genus; his discovery of Phacus longicauda (Ehrenberg) was one of the first species of the genus to be discovered (1830) and was later used as the lectotype species for the genus. Later workers such as Lemmermann (1930), Pochmann (1942) and Huber-Pestalozzi (1955) added additional species. They also attempted to subdivide Phacus into a number of subgenera and sections, mostly based on the morphology of the spiral pellicle surrounding the cells.

Since the establishment of the genus, classification of taxa has been difficult because many species display enormous morphological variability in characters such as cell shape and size. Many taxa of different ranks (species, varieties and forms) have been described, but the criteria for distinguishing them are often vague. With the advent of molecular phylogenetic methods, Phacus has undergone significant reclassification and some species are now distinguished by more reliable morphological differences, such as the presence of perpendicular "struts" in the periplast. Some species have been found to be cryptic, and are difficult or impossible to distinguish from each other using morphology alone. Two species, Euglena limnophila and Lepocinclis salinus, were found to be nested within the clade of Phacus. The genus Phacus was therefore redefined to include these species, preserving its monophyly, but these two species (now classified as Phacus limnophilus and Phacus salinus) differ from other Phacus in not having flattened cells.

== Habitat and ecology ==
Phacus are commonly found in freshwater habitats all over the world. Many species of this genus have been discovered in several countries, including Japan, the United States, Portugal, Brazil, Korea and the Philippines. Different members of the genus have been found in temperatures ranging from 11.4 to 21.6 °C, and a pH between 6.2 and 7.5. Phacus organisms are found in a range of freshwater environments (some more acidic or alkaline than others), prefer cooler temperatures, and on average exist in more neutral pH aquatic habitats. Many species of Phacus are considered to be euplanktonic (free-floating organisms or open water plankton) because they are commonly found together with other genera of euglenids such as Lepocinclis, Trachelomonas, Euglena. Although very common, they rarely become numerous enough to form blooms, unlike Euglena and Trachelomonas.

Being in an organically enriched freshwater environment is essential for the development of these species. Different studies have shown that the addition or removal of certain organic elements can have profound effects on cell development. In studies using beef extract to increase organic content of certain cultures, some species of Phacus were observed to have clear morphological changes different from the controls. These changes include: increasing thickness of the cell, increase in paramylon bodies (both in size and number in Phacus curvicauda), and the overall structure of the cells. Regardless of a large or small change in organic enrichment, studies show a consistency to these morphological changes. However, the amount of change that occurs varies between species and is dependent on the specific organic nutrients present. If the amount of organic nutrients in the genus' habitat is insufficient, occasionally they form resting cysts. If this occurs, the cells would expand (swell) and become more rounded, and also lose their flagella. This increase in size forces the cell to increase the number of paramylon storage granules and develop a polysaccharide mucilaginous wall for protection until it enters a more habitable environment. In addition, cell division continues to take place even as a reproductive cyst.

=== Feeding ===
Almost all Phacus are photosynthetic unicellular organisms, meaning that they are capable of producing their own food. Although the cells obtain nutrients through photosynthesis, they also have what appears to be a vestigial feeding apparatus located on their underside, similar to those of their phagotrophic relatives. One species, Phacus ocellatus, is secondarily non-photosynthetic and obtains its nutrients via osmotrophy.

== Description ==
=== Morphology ===
Phacus consists of single-celled, microscopic organisms. Generally these species are small, free-swimming and exhibit a vibrant green colour. Phacus is distinguished from other photosynthetic genera, such as Euglena, from the presence of its rigid cytoskeleton (although some species have semi-rigid or plastic cytoskeleton) made up of pellicular strips and its predominantly flat, leaf-shaped structure. Many different species express secondary fusion of these pellicular strips and many of the strips have a variety of shapes including S-shaped, A-shaped, M-shaped or plateau. The pellicle forms a shell around the cytoskeleton covering the whole cell and fuses together around the microtubule reinforced-pocket (MTR). This pocket acts as a sort of cytostome or ingestion organelle, allowing the organism to feed when bacteria enter inside. The microtubules are arranged in a peculiar doublet and triplet pattern in the upper canal. In certain species of Phacus, the MTR is a microtubule organizing center and is connected to a reservoir membrane by a striated fiber. Many species also possess an elongated caudal process (tail) with extended pellicle strips. Throughout the cytoplasm of the cell, there are numerous small, discoid chloroplasts. Chloroplasts that are present in large numbers are typically smaller, are without pyrenoids and species containing fewer chloroplasts tend to have much larger ones. Phacus, like all photosynthetic euglenoids, obtained their plastids through secondary endosymbiosis, where the ancestral phagocytic euglenoid engulfed a green alga, and the resulting organism became the plastid.

Cells of Phacus possess a reddish eyespot (stigma), located in the anterior of the cell, and two flagella which are inserted in a small reservoir (opening). One flagellum is long and emerges from the reservoir (the emergent flagellum), while the second flagellum is a short stump and vibrates within the reservoir. The emergent flagellum is responsible for cell movement by gyrating in the direction of travel allowing the cell to glide and swim in the water. Aside from the flagella, the flagellar apparatus also contains two basal bodies connected by a striated fiber, three asymmetric microtubular roots, and other connective fibers.

Phacus stores energy in the form of paramylon, a carbohydrate similar to starch; it has small paramylon grains distributed throughout the entire cell. In addition to the small paramylon grains, one or two larger paramylon grains occur and have a characteristic shape (globose, ring-shaped, rod-shaped, or semilunate) and are located at a characteristic part of the cell. The nucleus of the cell is generally positioned towards the middle of the cell and is adjacent to the paramylon reserve. Within the nucleus are permanently condensed chromosomes, which can easily be viewed under a light microscope.

=== Differences in morphology ===
Although the general morphology of the genus is considered to be well established, given the large number of species there are critical morphological differences observed worth noting. The sulcus for example, in many species is shallow (Phacus viridioryza), and in others it is deep and longitudinal (Phacus hordeiformis). As well, the shape of the cell in some species are completely flat, while many have also been described as helically twisted, straight or curved. Phacus helikoides is actually helical in shape throughout the entire cell as opposed to flat and leaf-shaped like most Phacus organisms.

Metaboly, which is the ability of some organisms to alter their shape, is not possible in Phacus due to the fusion of the genus' pellicular strips. These varied morphological shapes make defining the genus as symmetrical or asymmetrical rather difficult. Scientists who study the genus Phacus Dujardin, have also observed the presence of ellipsoid, tiny disk-shaped or flat-shaped paramylon grains. In some species of Phacus, a single plate dominates the interiors of the cell (Phacus orbicularis), and in others there are multiple plates with different morphologies that exist (Phacus curvicauda).

Other differences among species include: the presence or lack of haplopyrenoids within the chloroplasts, position of the nucleus, a large or small endosome, shape of the cytoskeleton, few to several paramylon discoid grains, the presence of lateral caps and presence of oblique truncated poles. In addition, the morphology of the caudal process in many species of Phacus is extremely varied. Phacus parvullis and Phacus pusillus have very a blunt caudal process while Phacus segretti and Phacus stokesii actually lack a caudal process entirely. Those species are described as having rounded posteriors in place of the caudal process. Studies show that morphological changes observed in the genus are possibly due to the level of organic enrichment in their freshwater habitats. These morphological differences, given the massive size of the genus, have led to certain confusion in Phacus taxonomy.

=== Life cycle ===
Phacus and other euglenids reproduce asexually. They do so by dividing their cells longitudinally, from the apex of the cell to the base. The process may occur while motile, or in a nonmotile, "palmelloid" stage. Until cytokinesis is fully complete, the cells remain attached to one another, forming what looks like a "two-headed" organism. Prior to cytokinesis, the amount of pellicle strips each cell has is doubled in order to have an equal number between each daughter cell. In addition, each daughter cell will contain half the number of the newly formed strips and half the number of the old strips present prior to cell division.

=== Genetics ===
A major genetic change in the genus occurred in its chloroplast genome throughout its evolution. This resulted in a genome reduction - possibly due to gene loss or transfer to the nucleus, an increase in the number of introns, and large genomic rearrangements.

== Evolution ==
The literature mentioned above have also looked into the evolutionary history of the genus' morphology. It is believed that the rigidity of the cells has evolved numerous times, and that was determined by comparing the semi-rigid pellicles of ancestral species with the rigid pellicles of their descendants. Another feature believed to have evolved, are the longitudinal strips that appear on most species. It appears that the number of those strips has either increased or decreased over time depending on certain species and that their arrangement (either helical or longitudinal) has also changed throughout evolution. Furthermore, it has been argued that certain behavioral and locomotor traits which previously existed for predatory feeding have no longer been selected. This seemed to have had an effect on the number of strips species of Phacus generally have. The changing numbers of strips and the clustered patterns associated are not actually adaptive themselves, but may have evolved due to the cell becoming more flat and more rigid over time. Those traits are believed to have evolved in order to adapt to a more planktonic lifestyle.

=== Phylogeny ===
Phacus is a member of the family Phacaceae, the order Euglenales, class Euglenoidea, and finally the phylum Euglenozoa. Many studies have attempted to determine is reconstruct the phylogenetic tree of Phacus based on molecular sequence data. Although the genus Phacus is recovered as monophyletic, this has required some adjustments to retain its monophyly, such as including the species Lepocinclis salinus which has non-flattened cells. It is sister to Lepocinclis, a similarly rigid genus. A current hypothesis is as follows (not all accepted species are included):

- - Phacus
    - - - - - - - - Clade K
                    - - - P. anomalus
                        - P. anacoelus
                      - P. curvicauda
                    - P. alatus
                  - P. stokesii
                - Clade J
                  - P. orbicularis
                  - P. paraorbicularis
              - Clade I
                P. lismorensis
            - - - Clade H
                  - - - P. ankylonoton
                      - P. tenuis
                    - P. applanatus
                  - - P. hamelii
                    - P. segretii
                - Clade G
                  P. salinus
              - Clade F
                - - P. gigas
                  - P. sp.
                - P. hamatus
          - - - Clade E
                - - P. caudatus
                  - P. manginii
                - - P. raciborskii
                  - - P. mariae
                    - P. sp.
              - Clade D
                P. oscillans group
            - Clade C
              - - P. longicauda group
                - P. helikoides group
              - P. elegans
        - Clade B
          - - P. pleuronectes
            - P. minutus
          - P. acuminatus
      - P. triqueter
    - Clade A
      - P. limnophilus
      - P. arnoldii
  - Lepocinclis (outgroup)

== Fossil history ==
The fossil record for Phacus, like most euglenoids, is very scarce, and little information is actually known of their geographical origins. However, there have been reports that Phacus-like microfossils have been discovered from pyriform cells, which seem to closely resemble that of Phacus or another closely related genus, Lepocinclis. These fossils, although not certain to belong to the genus, are estimated to be over 60 million years old.

== Practical importance ==
The presence of Phacus in certain bodies of water can actually indicate the level of organic pollution of the water. It has been observed that if a large number of Phacus organisms are present, that is indicative of high organic pollution. This particular trait allows scientists to determine the health of different bodies of water.
