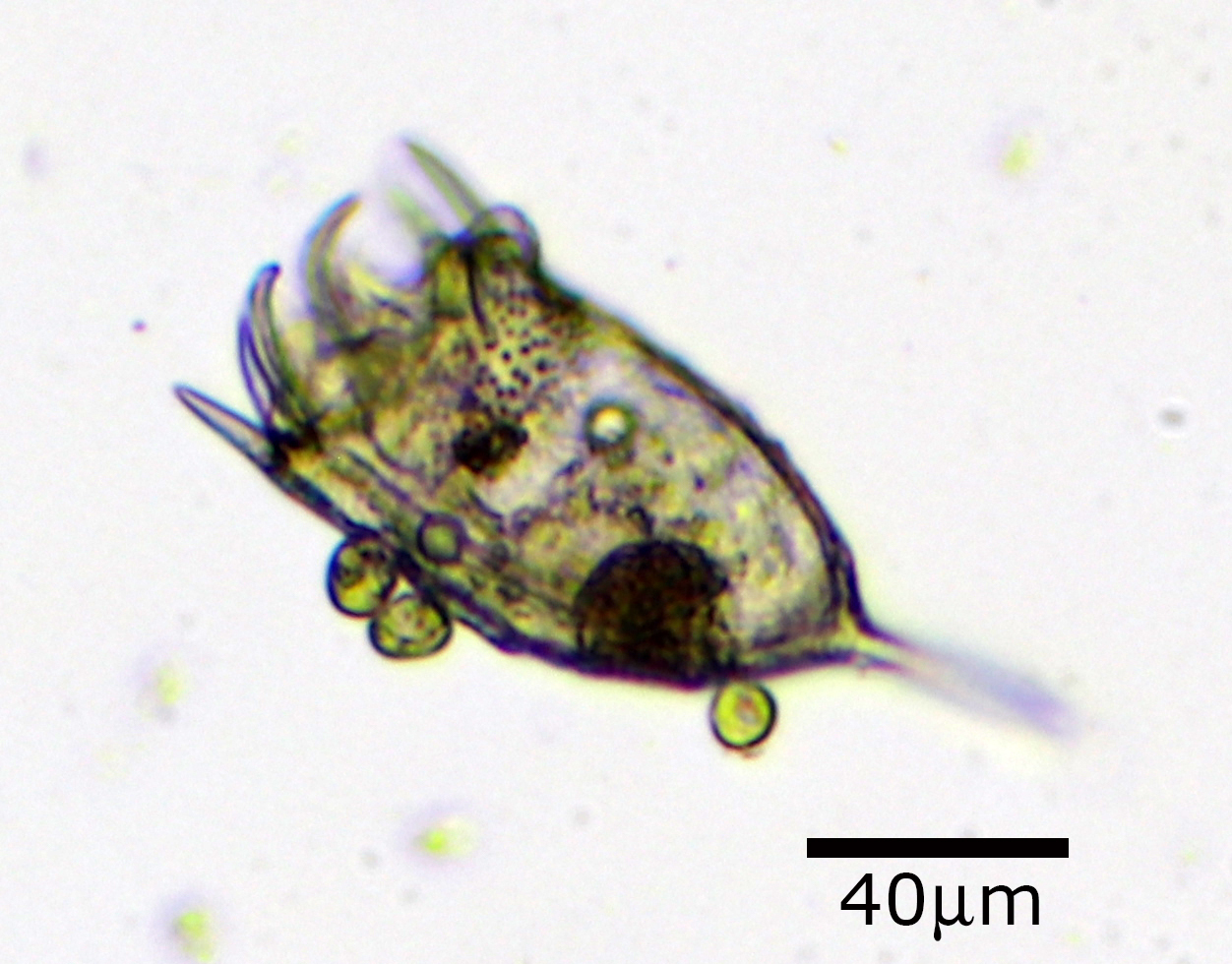
- Colacium vesiculosum, attached to a rotifer

Scientific classification
- Domain: Eukaryota
- Clade: Discoba
- Phylum: Euglenozoa
- Class: Euglenida
- Clade: Euglenophyceae
- Order: Euglenales
- Family: Euglenaceae
- Genus: Colacium; Ehrenberg, 1834

Type species
- Colacium vesiculosum Ehrenberg

= Colacium =

Genus of algae

Colacium is a genus of algae belonging to the family Euglenaceae. It has two phases: a motile phase and a sessile phase, where it is found attached to other freshwater organisms.

The genus has a cosmopolitan distribution.

== Description ==
Colacium is a single-celled or colonial organisms. Cells are small, about 20–40 μm, and are similar to that of Euglena, and are metabolic with parietal, lobed chloroplasts each with a pyrenoid, and monomorphic, small paramylon grains. In its typical sessile phase, the cells are attached to a substrate via a mucilaginous stalk or short pillow. Cells divide to form colonies where the cells are attached by branched, dendroidal stalks.

Cells of Colacium can grow a flagellum and become motile, escaping from the colony as a free-swimming cell.

Species:

- Colacium arbuscula Stein, 1878
- Colacium mucronatum Bourr. & Chadef.
- Colacium sideropus Skuja
- Colacium simplex Hub.-Pest.
- Colacium steinii Kent
- Colacium vesiculosum Ehrenberg, 1838
