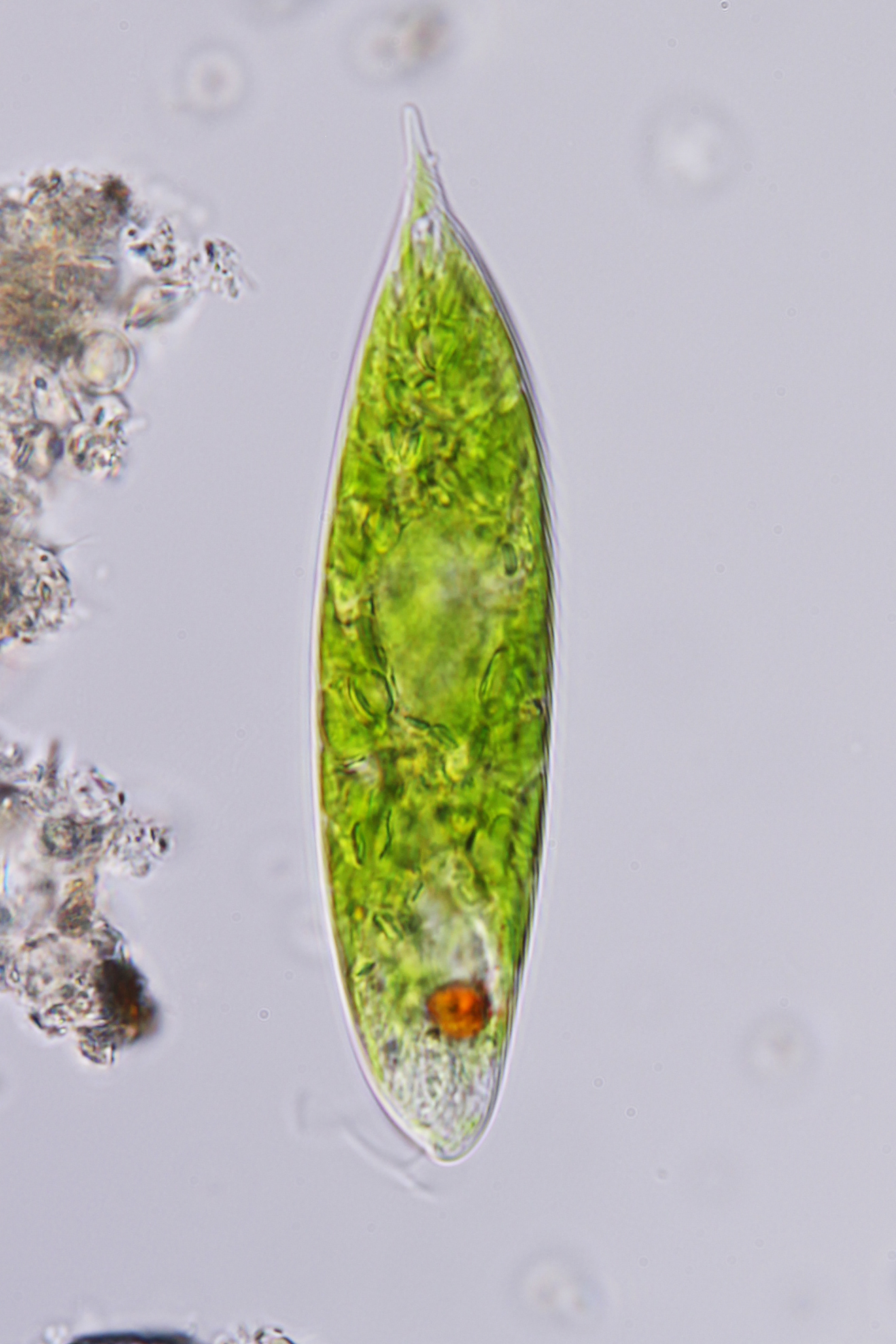

Scientific classification
- Domain: Eukaryota
- Phylum: Euglenozoa
- Class: Euglenida
- Clade: Euglenophyceae
- Order: Euglenales
- Family: Euglenaceae
- Genus: Euglena
- Species: E. sociabilis

Binomial name
- Euglena sociabilis P.A.Dangeard

= Euglena sociabilis =

Species of single-celled organism

Euglena sociabilis is a species of unicellular organism of the family Euglenaceae.. The species was described in 1902 by Pierre Augustin Dangeard.
