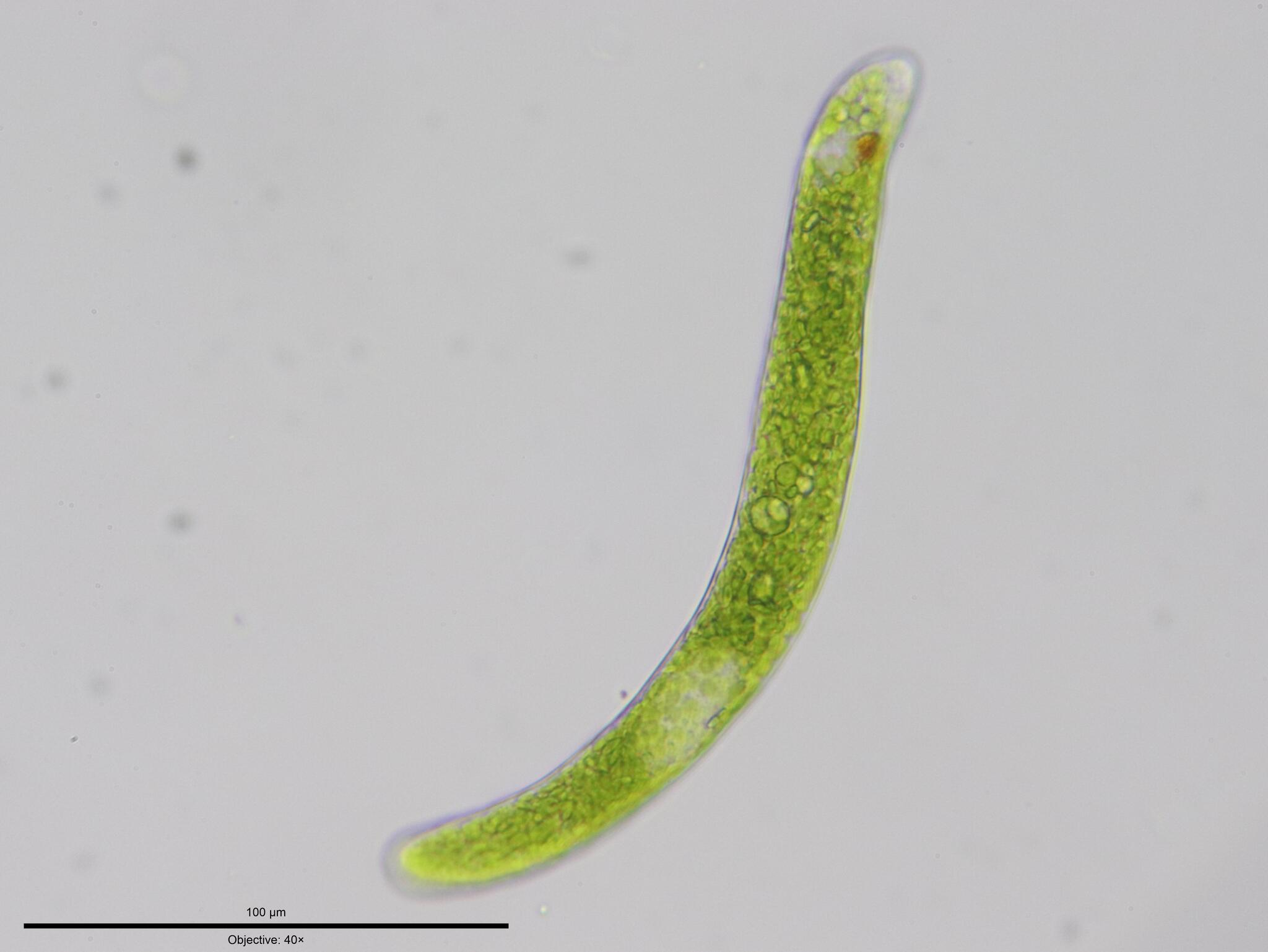

Scientific classification
- Domain: Eukaryota
- Clade: Discoba
- Phylum: Euglenozoa
- Class: Euglenida
- Clade: Euglenophyceae
- Order: Euglenales
- Family: Euglenaceae
- Genus: Euglena
- Species: E. ehrenbergii

Binomial name
- Euglena ehrenbergii G.A.Klebs

= Euglena ehrenbergii =

Species of single-celled organism

Euglena ehrenbergii is a species of unicellular organism described by Georg Albrecht Klebs in 1883.
