= Trachelomonas cervicula =

Scientific classification
- Domain: Eukaryota
- Clade: Discoba
- Phylum: Euglenozoa
- Class: Euglenida
- Clade: Euglenophyceae
- Order: Euglenales
- Family: Euglenaceae
- Genus: Trachelomonas
- Species: T. cervicula

Binomial name
- Trachelomonas cervicula A.Stokes

Species of algae

Trachelomonas cervicula is a species of algae from the genus Trachelomonas. The species was first described by Alfred C. Stokes in 1890.

== Description ==
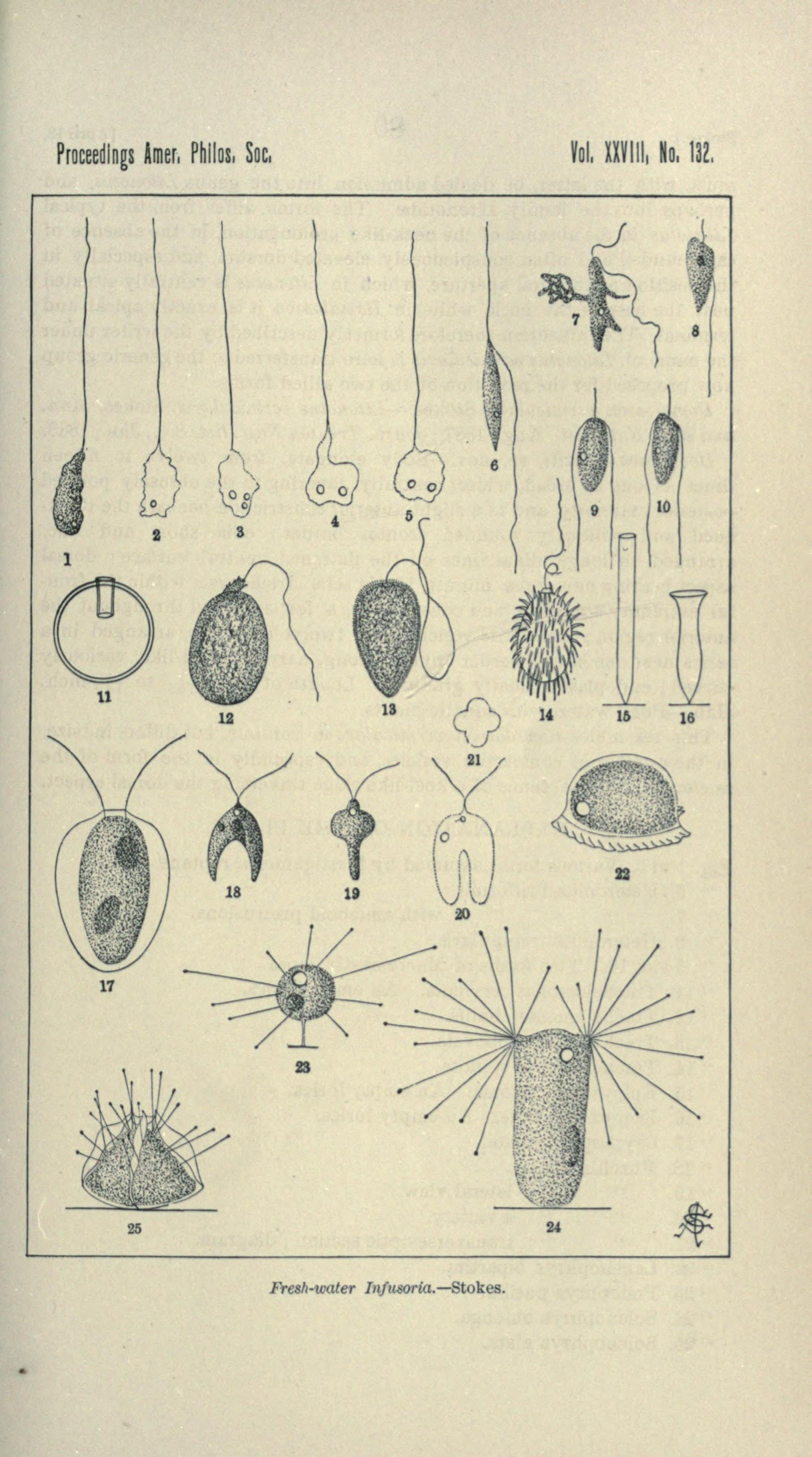
The holotype (11) of this species is based on specimens collected from a sheltered pond in February 1890.

Trachelomonas cervicula is a species of algae that can be found in abundance in fresh water ponds. Its smooth lorica is orange and yellow in colour and almost spherical. It has an anterior, round opening with a thickened, slightly projecting external border. Internally the orifice is a straight projecting external border, and produced internally as a straight, cylindrical, chitinous tube about one-third as long as the diameter of the lorica. This diameter of the lorica is 22–23 μm, 18–23 μm long, and 16–21 μm wide. The flagellum is about 1.5 to 2 times longer than the cell. The cell contains multiple, plate-like chloroplasts which lack pyrenoids.

The species differs from other Trachelomonas species by the presence of the internal tubular prolongation. Within T. cervicula, several varieties have been described. These include:

- T. cervicula var. heterocollis – differs from the typical variety in that the outer part of the collar is wider than the inner tube within the lorica.
- T. cervicula var. annulata – differs from the typical variety in having loricae with a thickened, ring-like ridge near the equator.

== Habitat and distribution ==
Its holotype was collected in some abundance from a sheltered pond in the early part of February, 1890. It is, therefore, probably a vernal species.

Initially the habitat of T. cervicula was described as protected pond water, specimens have also been observed in rivers such as the Lematang river and the Paraná River. Due the scarcity of studies on the genus Trachelomonas and the large numbers of species in the genus, it is difficult to know the full range. However, observations have been recorded in South America, Europe, and Southeast Asia.

== Ecology ==
Trachelomonas cervicula has been observed in an environment highly polluted by thallium and other generally toxic heavy metal elements such as cadmium, lead and zinc. Anthropogenic turbulence and pollution disturb their natural habitats, leading to a decline in natural fish stocks that depend on phytoplankton for food.
