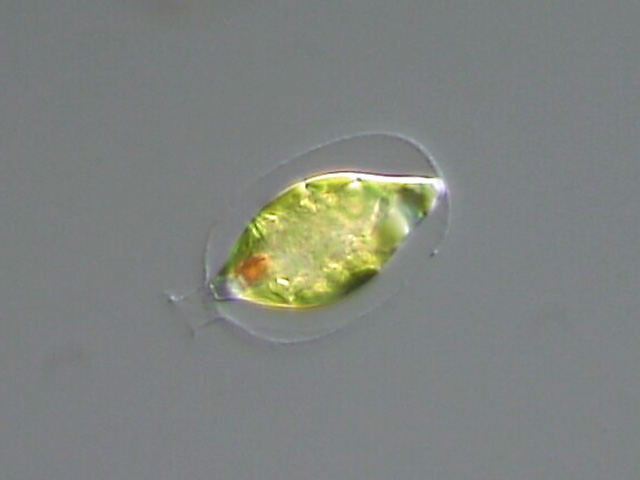

Scientific classification
- Domain: Eukaryota
- Supergroup: Discoba
- Phylum: Euglenozoa
- Class: Euglenida
- Clade: Euglenophyceae
- Order: Euglenales
- Family: Euglenaceae
- Genus: Trachelomonas; Ehrenberg, 1833

Type species
- Trachelomonas volvocina (Ehrenberg) Ehrenberg

= Trachelomonas =

Genus of euglenoids

Trachelomonas is a genus of swimming, free-living euglenoids characterized by the presence of a shell-like covering called a lorica. Details of lorica structure determine the classification of distinct species in the genus. The lorica can exist in spherical, elliptical, cylindrical, and pyriform (pear-shaped) forms. The lorica surface can be smooth, punctuate or striate and range from hyaline, to yellow, or brown. These colors are due to the accumulation of ferric hydroxide and manganic oxide deposited with the mucilage and minerals that comprise the lorica. In Trachelomonas, the presence of a lorica obscures cytoplasmic details of the underlying cell. In each Trachelomonas cell, there is a gap at the apex of the lorica from which the flagellum protrudes. Thickening around this gap results in a rim-like or collar-like appearance. During asexual reproduction, the nucleus divides yielding two daughter cells one of which exits through the opening in the lorica. This new cell then synthesizes its own new lorica.

== History of knowledge ==
Trachelomonas was first described by C. G. Ehrenberg in 1834. The name comes from the Greek roots trachelos, meaning "neck" (referring to the neck-like opening of the lorica), and monas, meaning "unit", now used conventionally for unicellular flagellates. Its separation from the genus Strombomonas occurred in 2008 with the discovery of five subclades within Trachelomonas through nuclear SSU and LSU rDNA analyses.

== Habitat and ecology ==
Trachelomonas is a common, cosmopolitan genus found in acidic to neutral fresh water (pH 4.5-7), often in habitats rich in iron and manganese, and pools rich in organic matter such as peat. These euglenoids have also been observed to prefer warm, eutrophic waters, increasing in abundance during harmful algal blooms of Planktothrix agardhii. Most species are photosynthetic, and thus contribute to global primary production; some species have been observed to be osmotrophs, having the ability to assimilate nutrients from its environment.

== Description ==
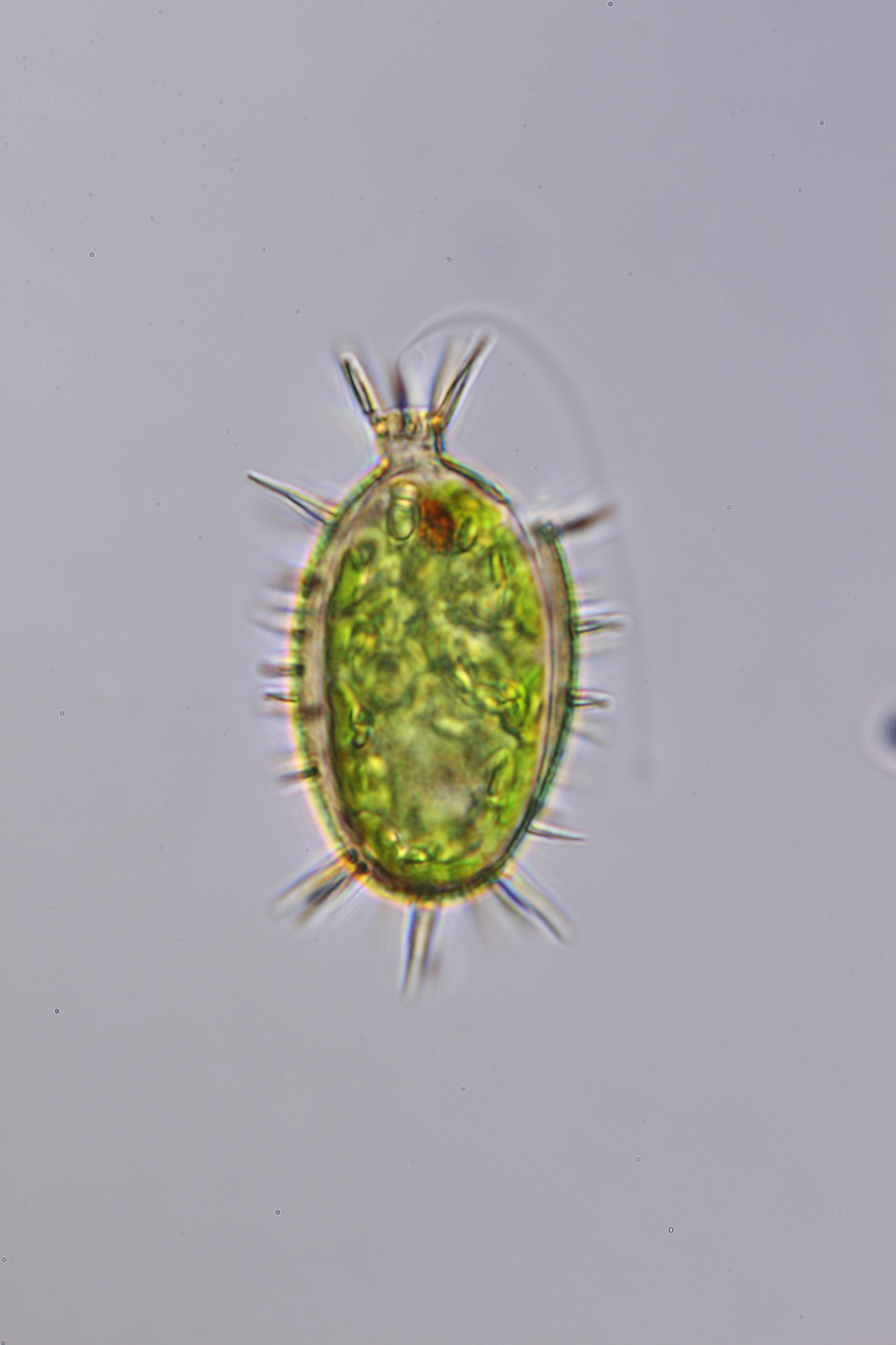
Trachelomonas hystrix, a species with spines

Trachelomonads are free-swimming, solitary, photosynthetic flagellates ranging in size from 5-100 um, with an ovoid shape, sharing similar morphological characteristics with its sister group, Strombomonas. These cells are enclosed in a rigid, shell-like envelope, made up of minerals and polysaccharide mucilage, with a defined collar or truncate extension that surrounds an anterior apical pore where the flagellum emerges from, also known as a lorica. The lorica can be distinguished between different species by the orientation of spines or other ornamentations, such as pores, warts or ridges, and can range from being colourless to orange/brown or even black based on the nutrients in their surroundings.

Most species are phototrophic, having a characteristic green colour due to the discoid or flattened, shield-like chloroplast, which usually bears sheathed, projecting or naked pyrenoids. The few species that are osmotrophic, lack chloroplasts; therefore, they are colourless. Similar to other euglenoids, the cell has many paramylon bodies that are used for the storage of starch; these can be a distinguishing trait for species with similar lorica structures. The structure and ornamentation of the lorica is very dependent on the growth conditions, especially the availability of nutrients. Therefore, the size, shape, collar form and the presence of spines and pores can vary, showing morphological plasticity within species. This can make it difficult to describe species since morphological features can vary greatly. Trachelomonads also have an eyespot, a feature of photosynthetic euglenoids, located outside the chloroplast with orange to red pigmentation. These cells also have one long emergent flagellum that has previously been identified to emerge from the apical pore, and a shorter flagellum that is within the furrow and not used for motility. Under light microscopy, it is also possible to see condensed chromosomes.

== Life history ==
Euglenoids have not been observed to undergo sexual reproduction; however, asexual reproduction does occur through mitosis followed by cytokinesis. The formation of the lorica after asexual reproduction first occurs through the external skin and then a fibrillar layer is formed between the cell surface and the skin. Then manganese and ferric hydroxide compounds are precipitated on the inner fibrillar layer to produce a thick envelope and the original external skin is lost. However, differences in these processes exist among species.

== Species ==
As of 2025, AlgaeBase accepts about 400 species within Trachelomonas. However, species diversity within Trachelomonas is likely to be "has been continuously under- and overestimated at the same time", due to two reasons: firstly, some taxa are likely to represent previously unnoticed cryptic species, and secondly, Trachelomonas can display diverse morphologies in different environmental conditions, leading to the same species appearing to be a different species elsewhere.

A list of species in Trachelomonas (incomplete):

- T. abrupta Svirenko
- T. acanthophora Stokes
- T. acanthostoma Stokes
- T. americana Lemmermann
- T. argentina Frenguelli
- T. armata (Ehrenberg) F.Stein
- T. bacillifera Playfair
- T. bernarddii Woloszynka
- T. bituricensis Wurtz
- T. caudata (Ehrenberg) F.Stein
- T. cervicula Stokes
- T. crispa Balech
- T. curta A.M.Cunha
- T. cylindrica Ehrenberg
- T. dastuguei Balech
- T. dubia Svirenko
- T. dybowskii Dreżepolski
- T. elliptica (Playfair) Deflandre
- T. euchlora (Ehrenberg) Lemmermann
- T. foliolata Skvortzov
- T. grandis Kam.P.Singh
- T. granulosa Playfair
- T. helvetica Lemmermann
- T. hexangulata Svirenko
- T. hispida (Perty) F.Stein
- T. horrida T.C.Palmer
- T. hystrix Teiling
- T. kellogii Skvortzov
- T. klebsii Deflandre
- T. lacustris Dreżepolski
- T. lefevrei Deflandre
- T. lemmermannii Wołoszyńska
- T. lismorensis Playfair
- T. megalacantha A.M.Cunha
- T. mirabilis Svirenko
- T. niklewskii Dreżepolski
- T. obtusa T.C.Palmer
- T. planctonica Svirenko
- T. polonica Dreżepolski
- T. pseudobulla Svirenko
- T. robusta Svirenko
- T. rugulosa F.Stein
- T. similis A.Stokes
- T. stokesiana Dreżepolski
- T. subcaudata Messikommer
- T. superba Svirenko
- T. sydneyensis Playfair
- T. urnigera Skuja
- T. volvocina (Ehrenberg) Ehrenberg
- T. volvocinopsis Svirenko
- T. volziii Lemmermann
- T. wislouchii Skvortzov
- T. zuberi Koczwara
