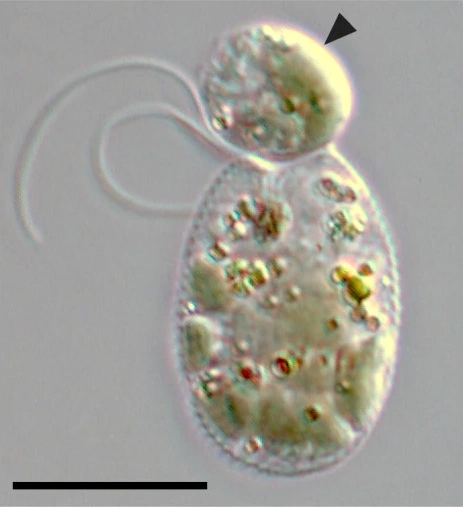
- Differential interference contrast microscopy of R. viridis capturing a Tetraselmis phytoplankton (arrowhead) with the anterior part of its cell. Scale bar: 10 μm

Scientific classification
- Domain: Eukaryota
- Clade: Euglenozoa
- Division: Euglenophyta
- Class: Euglenophyceae
- Order: Rapazida; Cavalier-Smith, 2016
- Family: Rapazidae; Cavalier-Smith, 2016
- Genus: Rapaza; Yamaguchi, Yubuki & Leander, 2012
- Species: R. viridis

Binomial name
- Rapaza viridis Yamaguchi, Yubuki & Leander, 2012

= Rapaza =

Monospecific genus of predatory algae

Rapaza viridis (Latin for 'green grasper') is a species of single-celled flagellate within the Euglenophyceae, a group of algae. It is the only species within the genus Rapaza, family Rapazidae and order Rapazida. It was discovered in a tide pool in British Columbia and described in 2012.

Rapaza viridis is a mixotroph (an organism that combines photosynthesis and ingestion of food), and the first and only known kleptoplastic species within the phylum Euglenozoa. It eats microalgae by engulfing them—a process called phagocytosis—and then uses the chloroplasts from these algae to perform photosynthesis, altering the chloroplasts' structure in the process. In particular, Rapaza viridis can only feed on Tetraselmis cells native to their original environment, and will reject any other prey.

Due to its unique mode of nutrition and phylogenetic position, Rapaza viridis is considered an evolutionary step between phagotrophs and phototrophs with permanent chloroplasts. Scientists consider that the common ancestor of all Euglenophyceae (a group of algae) was similar to R. viridis. It likely stole chloroplasts from its prey—just like R. viridis—a behavior supported by the discovery of genes in Euglenophyceae that came from different types of algae through a process called horizontal gene transfer. After the divergence of R. viridis, the remaining Euglenophyceae acquired permanent plastids from Pyramimonas.

== Etymology ==
The genus name Rapaza comes from Latin rapax 'seizing' and 'grasping', in reference to the feeding behavior of the cells. The specific name viridis, meaning 'green', references the color of the chloroplasts and algal prey cells in the process of being digested. Together, the binomial name means 'green grasper' in Latin.

== Taxonomy ==
Type locality of Rapaza viridis

The genus Rapaza was circumscribed in 2012 by protistologists Aika Yamaguchi, Naoji Yubuki and Brian S. Leander, on a study published in the journal BMC Evolutionary Biology. It was created to describe a population of euglenids isolated in 2010 from marine water samples collected at a tide pool in Pachena Beach, British Columbia, Canada. After cultivation, various growth experiments and molecular phylogenetics, the microorganisms were shown to belong to the phototrophic euglenids (Euglenophyceae) and were described as the species Rapaza viridis. The new species had a functioning chloroplast but also exhibited phagotrophy, making it the first and only example of mixotrophic euglenids.

The genus was defined as including flexible mixotrophic euglenids with two unequal flagella, a minimum of one chloroplast with three membranes and pyrenoids penetrated by stacks of thylakoids, a robust stigma, a paraflagellar swelling, and a feeding pocket supported by microtubules. The species was further defined by the length and width measurements of the cells and flagella, the presence of paramylon grains in the cytoplasm, 16 pellicle strips, four rows of microtubules supporting the feeding pocket, and Tetraselmis as its preferred prey.

In 2016, American protozoologist Thomas Cavalier-Smith assigned this genus to several monotypic higher-level taxa: family Rapazidae, order Rapazida and subclass Rapazia within the class Euglenophyceae, leaving the remaining euglenophyceans (Euglenales and Eutreptiales) under a new subclass Euglenophycidae. He defined these three taxa as containing phagotrophic photosynthetic eukaryote-eating (eukaryovorous) euglenids that swim in the water column instead of gliding on the substrate, and present four rows of microtubules supporting the feeding pocket instead of one as in Euglenophycidae. His classification scheme was neglected by other authors in favour of treating the entirety of Euglenida (Euglenophyceae plus a variety of heterotrophic flagellates) as a class, and deprecating the use of Rapazia as a subclass. As of 2021, only Rapazidae and Rapazida are accepted taxa.

== Biology ==
=== Morphology ===
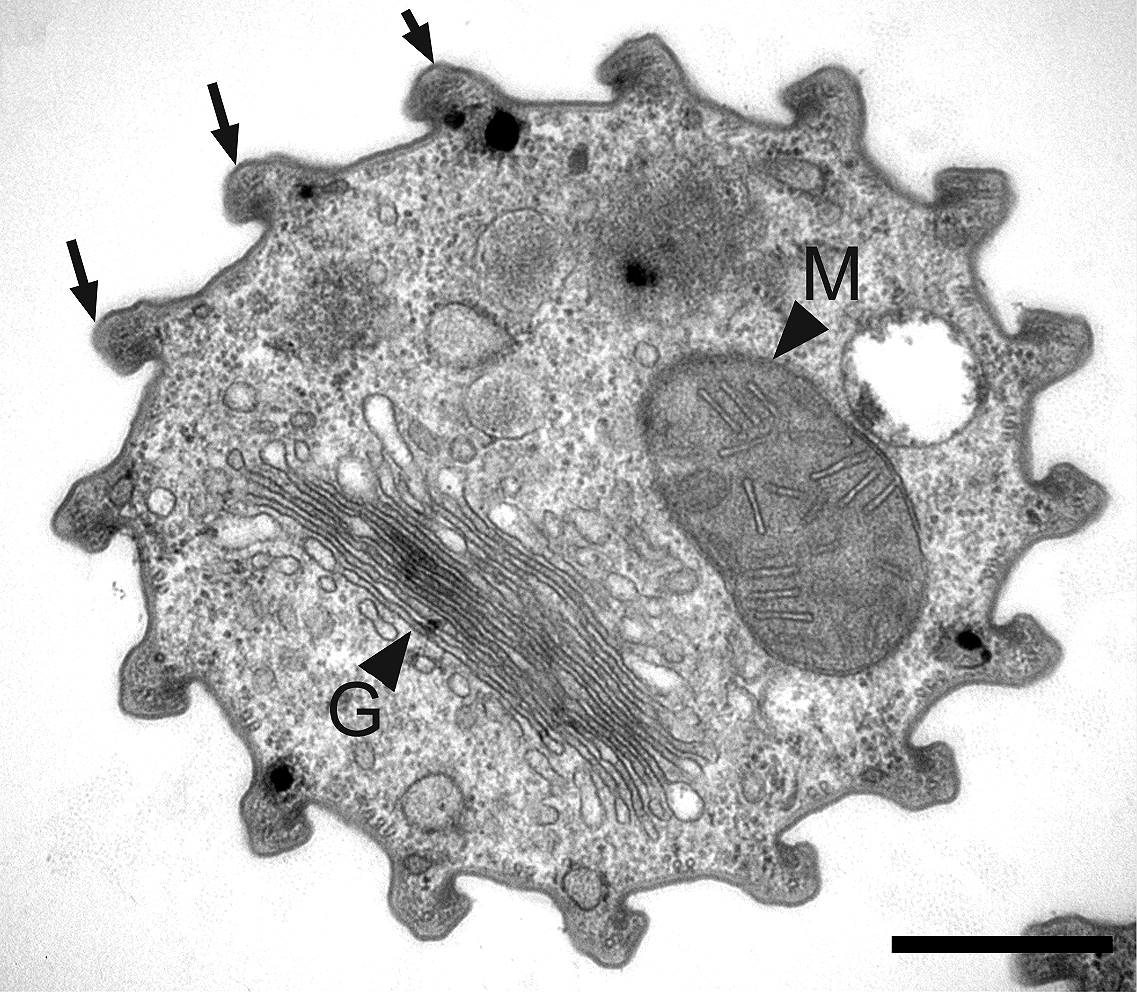
Transverse TEM image of R. viridis showing mitochondrion (M), Golgi body (G) and 16 pellicle strips (arrows). Scale bar: 1 μm

Rapaza viridis is a unicellular flagellate, a type of protist that is capable of swimming by using two flagella that differ in length and in movement. The cells are slender with a tapered posterior end, measuring approximately 10–38 μm long and 3–15 μm wide. Both flagella arise from a pocket located at the anterior end of the cell, one twice as long as the other but with the same thickness. The longer flagellum, about 1.25 times the length of the cell, is always directed forward. The shorter flagellum, about 0.65 times the cell length, is directed backward, but sometimes moves forward in an oar-like motion. Like other euglenids, cells are surrounded by a pellicle composed of 16 protein strips arranged helically below the cell membrane, and contain mitochondria with discoidal cristae. As in other spirocutes (i.e. flexible euglenids), cells of R. viridis are capable of 'metaboly' or 'euglenoid movement', which allows for active peristaltic deformation of the cell shape. Its feeding apparatus consists of one rod built of four rows of microtubules and a feeding pocket. There is a stigma composed of 1 to over 10 pigmented particles. The cytoplasm contains ellipsoid paramylon grains, as well as polysaccharide grains as a result of photosynthesis.

=== Predation ===
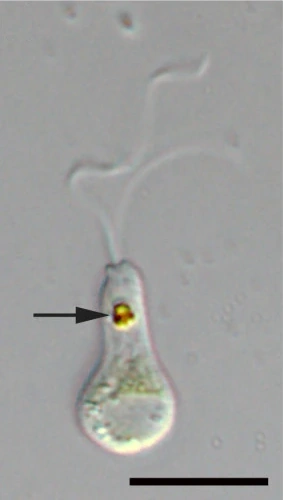
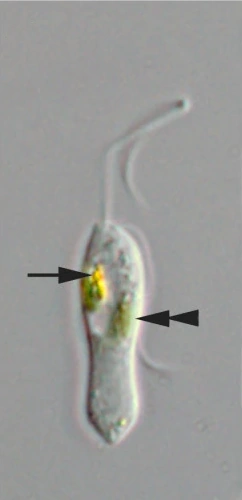
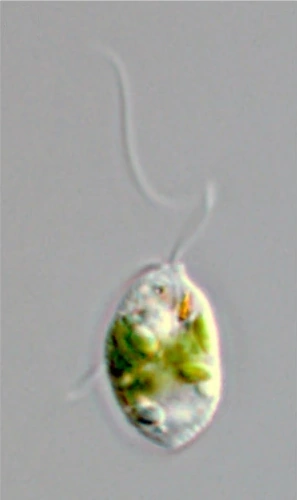
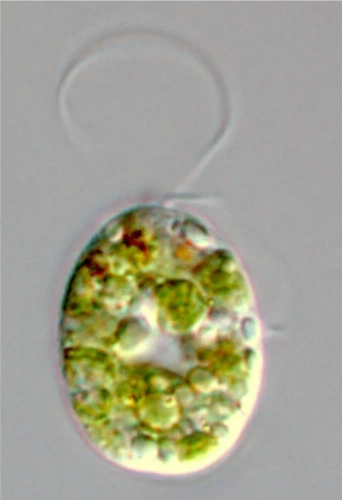
LM of R. viridis cells that were starved for 7 days (left) and cells that were fed 24 hours earlier (right). Arrow: stigma, double arrowhead: chloroplast. Scale bar: 10 μm.

Rapaza viridis is an obligate mixotroph that feeds on algae through phagocytosis. In the same sample where the species was discovered, the microorganism consumed native Tetraselmis algae and grew to distinctly larger and brighter cells in their presence, digesting them completely in the course of around 12 hours. When starved from the algae, cells of R. viridis became smaller and colorless, retaining at least one healthy chloroplast within its cytoplasm. During growth experiments, cells of R. viridis were exposed to a variety of different algae (e.g., Navicula, Pycnococcus, Dunaliella, Scrippsiella and non-native strains of Tetraselmis) while starved from the Tetraselmis strain that the species was found with. However, the mixotroph rejected all other preys, and could not survive for longer than 35 days without being exposed to that specific algal strain. Even under constant supply of that strain, the species could not survive for more than a week in the absence of a light source for photosynthesis.

Upon exposition to the native Tetraselmis strain, R. viridis cells enter a feeding frenzy: they capture algae with the anterior part of the cell and drag the prey, either swimming backward in a spiral pattern or rotating rapidly. The euglenid can gradually peel away the theca (cell covering) of Tetraselmis through repeated peristaltic euglenoid movement (or metaboly), and then engulf the naked prey cell, or engulf the cell with an intact theca and afterwards discharge the theca. The entire process takes between 5 and 40 minutes, but a single R. viridis individual can contain several ingested Tetraselmis cells.

=== Chloroplasts and kleptoplasty ===
When describing Rapaza viridis, two types of distinct chloroplasts were reported: one belonging to the ingested green alga Tetraselmis, and one homologous to the chloroplasts seen in phototrophic euglenids. The former were surrounded by two membranes and contained an eyespot and pyrenoids surrounded by starch, without any penetrating thylakoids. The latter were surrounded by three membranes and contained 1–3 pyrenoids, as well as thylakoids in stacks of three that penetrate the pyrenoids. From these observations, it was inferred that R. viridis possesses 'canonical' plastids, i.e. completely functional plastids equivalent to those seen in other Euglenophyceae, which depend on the host cell for survival and multiply and evolve with it.

However, subsequent studies revealed that R. viridis does not have canonical plastids. Instead, it extracts and temporarily retains the chloroplasts of its prey for its own use, a process known as kleptoplasty ('stealing of plastids'). After phagocytosis of the algal prey, its cell membrane is digested and the plastids are separated from the other cellular components, which are later excreted from the host cell. Then, the stolen plastids ('kleptoplasts') are transformed until they resemble canonical plastids: they are divided into smaller fragments by fission, the green algal pyrenoid surrounded by starch disappears, smaller pyrenoids penetrated by thylakoids are formed, the starch grains gradually disappear, and a three-membrane envelope is displayed (two membranes from the original chloroplast and one membrane belonging to the food vacuole).

Rapaza viridis needs a regular influx of kleptoplasts, obtained through the phagocytosis of its prey. Without acquiring new kleptoplasts, the cells cannot survive for more than 35 days. During starvation, the remaining kleptoplasts are gradually degraded, and vacuoles are formed to recycle intracellular substances.

== Distribution and habitat ==
The species Rapaza viridis was reported in a tide pool in Pachena Beach, British Columbia. Because of this location, it is considered a marine species. In addition, the TARA Oceans expedition and Ocean Sampling Day campaign recovered an enormous diversity of environmental sequences that belong to or are most closely related to Rapaza, particularly within the Mediterranean Sea. These sequences, named Rapaza-like operational taxonomic unit (OTUs), were more abundant in waters with high temperatures (20–30°C).

== Evolution ==
According to phylogenetic analyses, Rapaza viridis is the sister group to all other Euglenophyceae. This phylogenetic position is consistent with its place as an evolutionary step between the completely phagotrophic peranemids and the phototrophic Euglenophyceae, because mixotrophy is considered the transitional state during the establishment of the endosymbiotic prey cell and the phagotrophic host cell. It is also consistent with other intermediate characters. For example, it is the only eukaryote-eating euglenid that, instead of gliding on the substrate, is capable of swimming in the water column, a pattern only seen in phototrophs. It is also the only euglenophycean that only presents the MAT paralogue of the enzyme methionine adenosyltransferase, found in heterotrophic euglenids, whereas the remaining euglenophyceans acquired the MATX paralogue after the split from Rapaza.

- - - Spirocuta
      - - Euglenophyceae kleptoplasty, HGT from algae
          - chloroplasts, MATX paralogue
            - Euglenales
            - Eutreptiales
          - Rapaza
        - Peranemida
      - Anisonemia
    - "Ploeotiida"
  - Petalomonadida

Phylogenetic position of Rapaza within the Euglenida, with sublabels indicating evolutionary steps towards permanent chloroplasts.

Rapaza viridis is the first case of kleptoplasty within Euglenozoa. Particularly, its chloroplasts are obtained from the green alga Tetraselmis. Transcriptomic and genomic analyses revealed that there are genes encoded in the nucleus of R. viridis and other Euglenophyceae for plastid-targeted proteins acquired from chloroplasts of many different algae (including algae from the "red lineage", i.e. red and chromalveolate algae) through multiple ancient events of horizontal gene transfer. Due to these discoveries, the leading hypothesis is that the last common ancestor of all Euglenophyceae was not a phototroph, but an alga-eating phagotroph without permanent plastids that could have exhibited kleptoplasty, much like Rapaza viridis. This common ancestor horizontally acquired the protein targeting system from many algae after prolonged coexistence (from both kleptoplasty and predation). This targeting system could have been involved in the establishment of permanent plastids in the remaining Euglenophyceae, which originated from the green alga Pyramimonas. Additionally, Tetraselmis-derived genes are abundant in other Euglenophyceae, while Pyramimonas-derived genes are minor in Rapaza, meaning that the close association with Pyramimonas began after the divergence of Rapaza.

In addition to kleptoplast-targeted proteins, Rapaza viridis obtained a nucleus-coded nitrate reductase through horizontal gene transfer from ancient algal prey. Nitrate reductases are a key component of phototrophic organisms, since it allows for the assimilation of inorganic nitrogen, which heterotrophic organisms are not capable of. This enzyme, known as RvNaRL, is a crucial step of metabolic integration in the early stages of secondary endosymbiosis towards permanent phototrophy.
