= Discoplastis =

- Discoplastis spathirhyncha

Scientific classification
- Domain: Eukaryota
- Clade: Discoba
- Phylum: Euglenozoa
- Class: Euglenida
- Clade: Euglenophyceae
- Order: Euglenales
- Family: Phacaceae
- Genus: Discoplastis; R.E.Triemer, 2006

Type species
- Discoplastis spathirhyncha (Skuja) Triemer

Species
- Discoplastis adunca (J.Schiller) Triemer; Discoplastis angusta (C.Bernard) Zakryś & Łukomska; Discoplastis constricta (Matvienko) Zakryś & Łukomska; Discoplastis excavata (J.Schiller) Zakryś & Łukomska; Discoplastis gasterosteus (Skuja) Zakryś & Łukomska; Discoplastis spathirhyncha (Skuja) Triemer

Genus of algae

Discoplastis is a genus of euglenoid algae in the family Phacaceae. The species of this genus are found in Europe, North America, South-east Asia and Australia.

Discoplastis consists of solitary, free-living cells with one emergent flagellum. The cells have a flexible, spirally striated pellicle and are therefore capable of metaboly. When swimming, the cells are a variety of different but characteristic shapes (cylindrical, fusiform, hourglass-shaped, etc.). The posterior of the cell ends in a pointed, colorless cell. Within each cell there are numerous small, discoid chloroplast lacking pyrenoids. Cells have paramylon grains; the paramylon grains may be monomorphic (all small) or dimorphic (some large, some small). As with other euglenoids, the cell has a reddish eyespot (stigma).

Discoplastis can be distinguished by to the combination of small, discoid parietal chloroplasts without pyrenoids (a synapomorphy for the family Phacaceae), and its flexibility. The similar genus Flexiglena is even more flexible, displaying metabolic movement even when swimming. It is also distinguished by having a large paramylon grain directly adjacent to the stigma.

Molecular phylogenetics suggest the following relationships between species:

- - - - - D. gasterosteus
        - D. excavata
      - D. constricta
    - - D. spathirhyncha
      - D. angusta
  - D. adunca
