= Strombomonas =

Scientific classification
- Domain: Eukaryota
- Clade: Discoba
- Phylum: Euglenozoa
- Class: Euglenida
- Clade: Euglenophyceae
- Order: Euglenales
- Family: Euglenaceae
- Genus: Strombomonas; Deflandre

Type species
- Strombomonas verrucosa (Daday) Deflandre

Genus of euglenoid flagellates

Strombomonas is a genus of free-living euglenoids characterized by the presence of a shell-like covering called a lorica. It is found in freshwater habitats, and has a cosmopolitan distribution; about 100 species are accepted.

== Description ==
Strombomonas consists of solitary, free-living cells surrounded by a shell, called a lorica. The lorica has an apical opening where the flagellum emerges. The cells themselves are mostly 25–50 μm long and 15–35 μm wide, and are mostly like Euglena in terms of morphology. They contain numerous greenish chloroplasts with pyrenoids, although this can often be difficult to see through the lorica.

The lorica is sac- or vase-shaped, with a neck and tailpiece of varying lengths. The lorica aggregates particles on its outer surface, giving it a scabrous (rough) texture; the lorica also lacks spines, pores or pits, although it may have wrinkles. The lorica start off colorless but can often yellowish to brownish due to the impregnation of iron, silica and manganese compounds.

== Taxonomy ==
Strombomonas was first described by Georges Deflandre in 1930, transferring species out of the similar genus Trachelomonas. In the decades following, Strombomonas was not always accepted, and was sometimes considered a synonym of Trachelomonas. Currently, however, the two genera are generally accepted. Morphologically, Strombomonas has loricae without pores or spines, while Trachelomonas has loricae with pores or spines during at least part of its life cycle. In Trachelomonas the lorica has a definite "collar" at the anterior, while there in Strombomonas the lorica has an opening but no definite collar. In addition, the loricae of Strombomonas are formed from the anterior to the posterior, while in Trachelomonas the loricae develop evenly throughout the cell. Strombomonas and Trachelomonas form sister clades according to molecular phylogenetic studies.

Within Strombomonas, species delimitation has traditionally relied on lorica morphology, since internal structures like chloroplasts are often difficult to visualize through the lorica. However, the true number of species may be smaller than the number of described species, since the lorica morphology can vary due to environmental conditions leading to the same species being described more than once. Taxonomic revisions using molecular data have started to include other characters, such as the number of chloroplasts and pyrenoid morphology.
