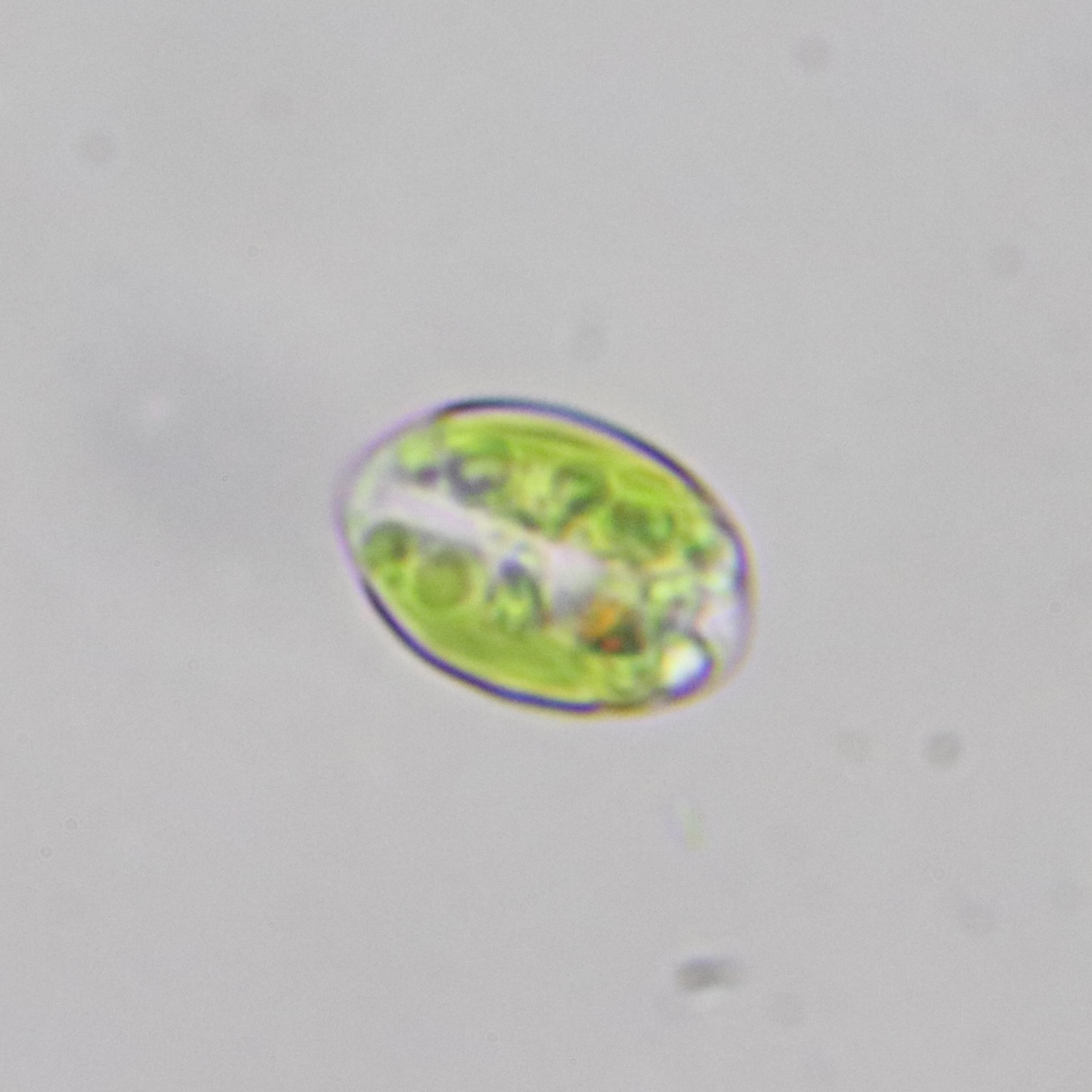
- Cryptoglena sp.

Scientific classification
- Domain: Eukaryota
- Clade: Discoba
- Phylum: Euglenozoa
- Class: Euglenida
- Family: Kinetoplastida
- Genus: Cryptoglena; Ehrenberg, 1831

Type species
- Cryptoglena pigra Ehrenberg

= Cryptoglena =

Genus of algae

Cryptoglena (/ˌkɹɪptoʊˈgliːnə/) is a genus of photosynthetic euglenids that was first described in 1831 by Christian Gottfried Ehrenberg. Today, its circumscription is controversial: Bicudo and Menezes consider twenty-one species as Cryptoglena, of which, nine are uncertain. Cryptoglena species are water-based, living in both freshwater and marine environments. They are biflagellated, with one internal flagellum and one external flagellum, which allows movement through environments as demonstrated by Kim and Shin in the species C. pigra. The cells of Cryptoglena resemble a coffee bean, as they have a groove that runs the length of the cell on one side and makes them U-shaped in cross section. They are ovoid in shape and are small, with the larger cells being on average 25 x 15 μm. After being first described in 1831, little work was done on the genus until the late 1970s and early 1980s, after the scanning electron microscope completed development and was implemented into laboratories. Work then proceeded with the developments of molecular biology, which allows for classifications based on DNA sequences. For Cryptoglena the main DNA used for classification are small subunit (SSU) and large subunit (LSU) rDNA.

== Etymology ==
"Cryptoglena" derives from Latinized Greek and means "hidden-eyeball" or "secret-eyeball", crypto (κρυπτός) being the combining form of "secret" and glene (γλήνη) being "eyeball". The genus received its name in 1831 from Ehrenberg.

== History of knowledge ==
First described in 1831, the genus Cryptoglena did not garner much attention until the mid-twentieth century: the type species, C. pigra, was the only species that was considered valid for one hundred years before more species started to be added to the genus. During the early to mid-twentieth century, the phylogenetic placement of Cryptoglena was uncertain; scientists such as Huber-Pestalozzi (1955) and Leedale (1967) could not agree if Cryptoglena should belong in the family Euglenaceae. Some of the arguments between Huber-Pestalozzi and Leedale arose due to their inability to study and find the species. Even today, C. pigra and C. skujae often fail to be noticed in field samples due to their small size. Along with this debate as to which family Cryptoglena belonged to, came a debate as to which species belonged in the genus that originated when molecular data revealed that 17 species formerly classified as Cryptoglena are actually cryptomonads. These debates ended as molecular biology techniques were becoming more prevalent for the classification of organisms. At the time Rosowski and Lee’s work was published, there were four species in the genus. In the early 2000s, DNA and RNA sequencing became much more accessible to laboratories around the world, which lead to more species being classified in the genus

== Habitat and ecology ==
In nature, Cryptoglena is free-living in both freshwater and marine environments. Species in the genus are photosynthetic autotrophs that live as one of the bases for the water-based food webs in which they live. The species have been shown to be resistant to environmental factors and can survive well even in areas of predation. Cryptoglena are consumed by species that are larger in size or that have the ability to increase oral cavity volume or break down cells prior to ingestion, such as those in the phylum Amoebozoa.

== Morphology ==
Members of Cryptoglena are single-celled organisms, U-shaped in cross-section, with the largest cells having a length of approximately 25 μm and width of 15 μm. Smaller species of the genus, such as C. skujae, have diameters less than 10 μm in length. Like other photosynthetic euglenids, it is green in color due to the presence of chloroplast. Below the plasma membrane of the cell lies the pellicle, a thin cuticle made up of interconnecting strips (16 strips total) that provides protection and support to the cell membrane. Microtubules connect to the interstrip regions of the pellicle and act in a skeleton-like function protection the cell from external pressure and giving it shape (Rosowski and Lee, 1978). This microtubule skeleton creates a longitudinal sulcus on one side of the cell. Located at the anterior end of the cell lies the reservoir, the anchor points for flagella. Cryptoglena is a biflagellated genus, with one flagellum that is emergent (protrudes out from the reservoir) and one short flagellum that remains inside the reservoir. The emergent flagellum is used for movement through the environment and has a paraxonemal (paraxial) rod which functions to support it. Microtubular roots extend into the cell from the reservoir to prevent the cell from getting damaged during flagellar movements and insert to the reinforcing microtubular band. Another band of supportive microtubules forms in the dorsal region and is therefore called the dorsal band of microtubules.

The stigma (eyespot) is located on the right side of the organism when it is looked at in ventral view and is orange in colour from the carotenoids that are present in a plate-like conglomeration. The stigma is used to detect light and can signal the flagellum which can then move the organism to areas with more or less light when required. Each cell contains a contractile vacuole and near the vacuole, a single Golgi dictyosome is present that contains many cisternae and small vesicles that move throughout the cell. Microbodies have near constant association with both the dictyosome itself and the chloroplast. One U-shaped chloroplast is present in each cell. The U-shape allows for the chloroplast’s volume to increase directly with cell volume. In some cells the chloroplast can almost form a cylinder, however, the chloroplast is prevented from fusing to itself by the cell membrane. The chloroplast lacks a pyrenoid, but cells still produce paramylon grains; two of them are present between the cell’s pellicle and the chloroplast. Smaller grains are also present in the cell, however, they have no association with the chloroplast. Multiple mitochondria can be located within cells and they have plate-like cristae. In the posterior region of the cells lies the nucleus, which contains the chromatin that remains permanently condensed and attached to the inner nuclear membrane.

== Life cycle ==
Cryptoglena reproduce asexually via binary fission. Prior to cell division, the nucleus undergoes mitosis. The ploidy of Cryptoglena has not been investigated (although it is likely haploid), and the life cycle has not been studied thoroughly.

== Genetics ==
The genes of the genus Cryptoglena show large variation from other genera in their 16S and 18S ribosomal subunit genes (30-45% difference) and have been studied heavily in most species to determine which genus they belong to. The deviation from other groups of organisms is only present when multiple gene analysis is performed. When looking at genes individually, Cryptoglena ends up on multiple different branches in different parts of euglenozoa. Cryptoglena also speciate in a cryptic manner with debates occurring over whether there are multiple new species, or if these so-called new species should fall under the C. pigra name. The reason for this debate stems from the similarity of genes such as nuclear-encoded SSU and LSU rDNA, and plastid-encoded SSU and LSU rDNA. These genes have been found with 100% similarity in morphologically different species calling into question the accuracy of the discovery of new species.

== Species ==
The following species are recognized:

- Cryptoglena agilis
- Cryptoglena alata
- Cryptoglena australis
- Cryptoglena caerulescens
- Cryptoglena conica
- Cryptoglena cornuta
- Cryptoglena dubia
- Cryptoglena lenticularis
- Cryptoglena longicauda
- Cryptoglena longisulca
- Cryptoglena phacoidea
- Cryptoglena pigra
- Cryptoglena similis
- Cryptoglena skujae
- Cryptoglena soropigra
- Cryptoglena truncata
- Cryptoglena tumida
