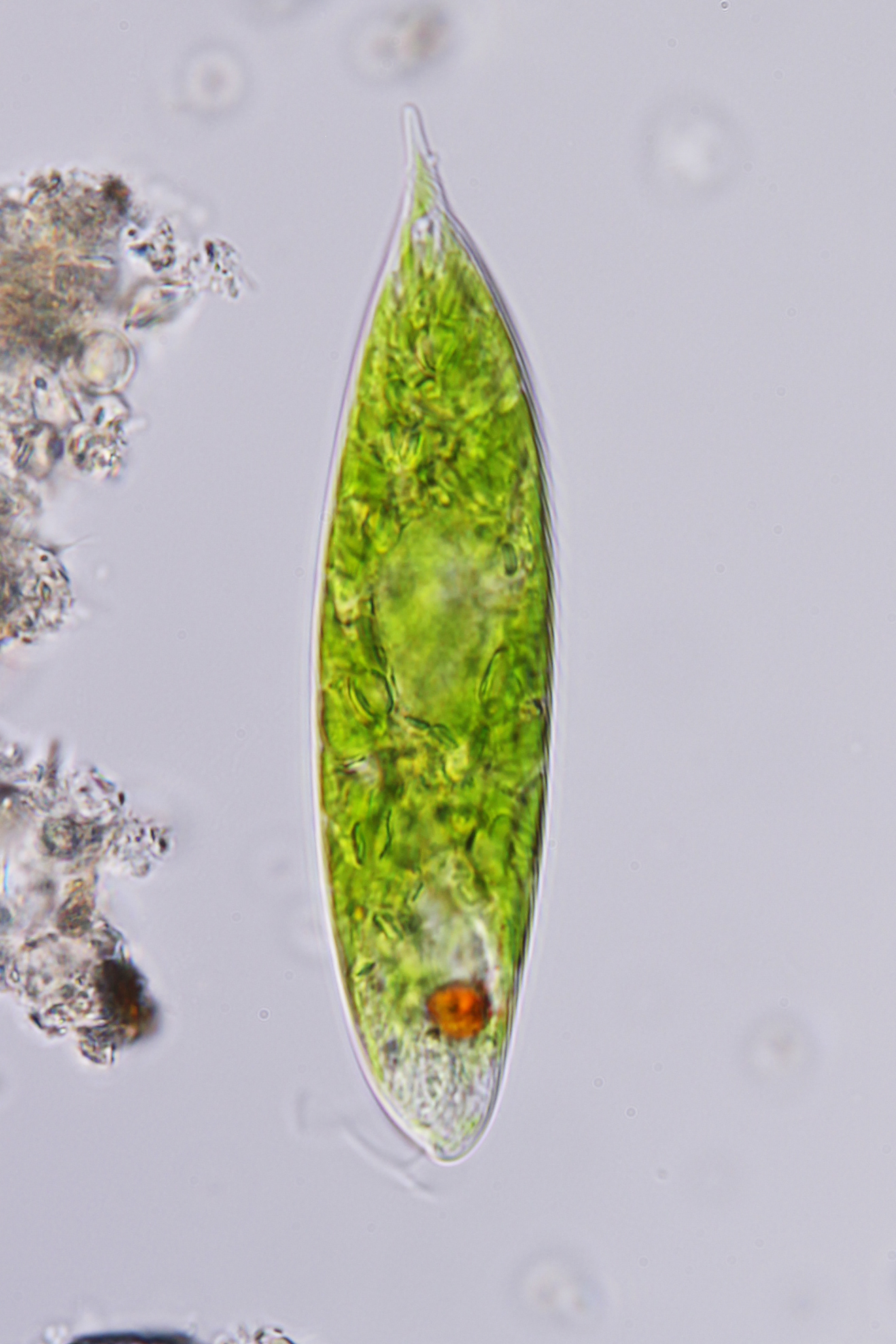
- Euglena sociabilis
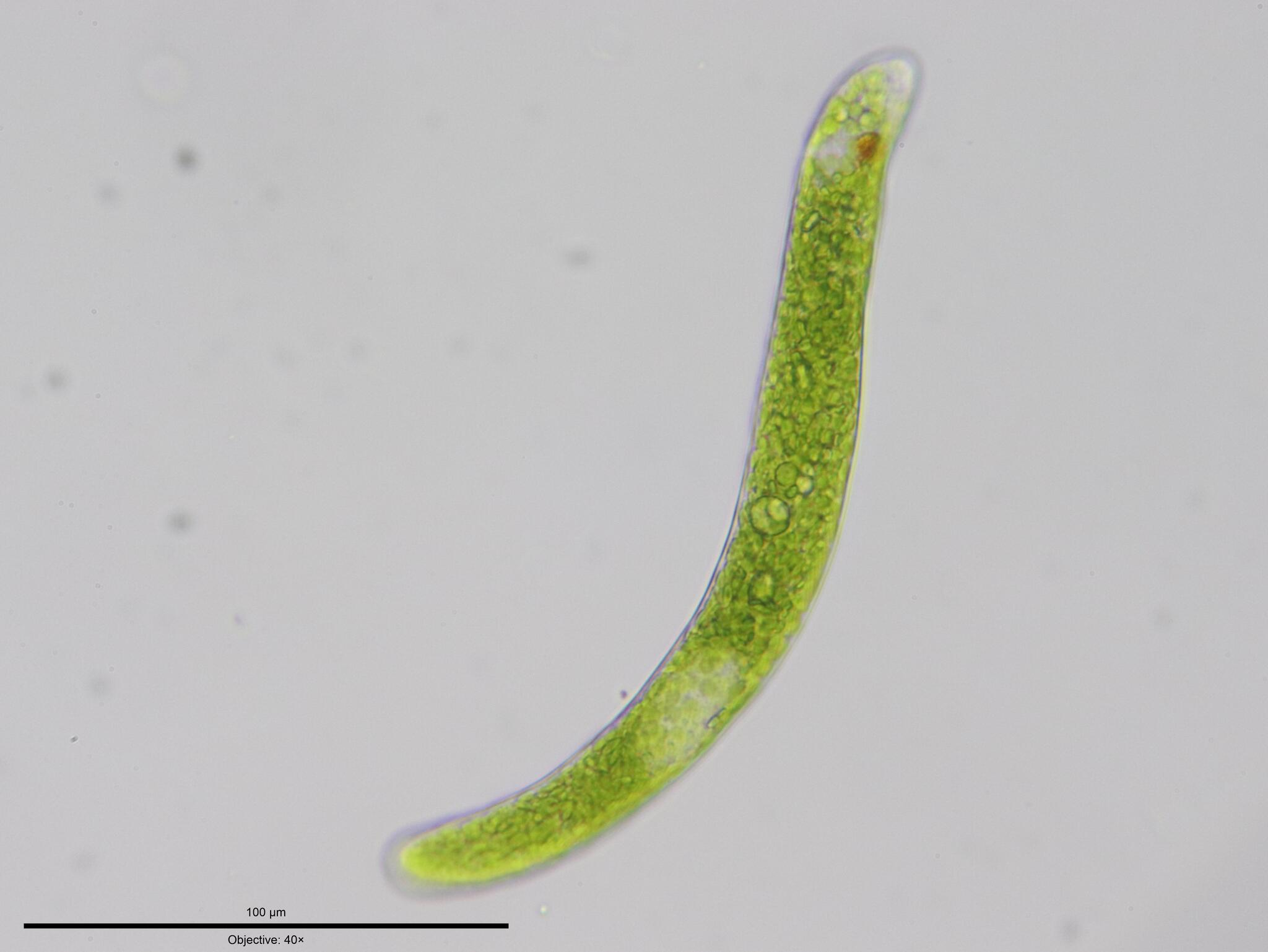
- Euglena ehrenbergii

Scientific classification
- Domain: Eukaryota
- Phylum: Euglenozoa
- Class: Euglenida
- Clade: Euglenophyceae
- Order: Euglenales
- Family: Euglenaceae
- Genus: Euglena; Ehrenberg, 1830

Type species
- Euglena viridis (O.F.Müller) Ehrenberg

= Euglena =

Genus of unicellular flagellate eukaryotes

Euglena is a genus of single-celled, flagellate eukaryotes. It is the best-known and most widely studied member of the class Euglenoidea, a diverse group containing some 54 genera and at least 200 species. Species of Euglena are found in fresh water and salt water. They are often abundant in quiet inland waters where they may bloom in numbers sufficient to color the surface of ponds and ditches green (E. viridis) or red (E. sanguinea).

The species Euglena gracilis has been used extensively in the laboratory as a model organism.

Most species of Euglena have photosynthesizing chloroplasts within the body of the cell, which enable them to feed by autotrophy, like plants. However, they can also take nourishment heterotrophically, like animals. Since Euglena have features of both animals and plants, early taxonomists, working within the Linnaean two-kingdom system of biological classification, found them difficult to classify. It was the question of where to put such "unclassifiable creatures" that prompted Ernst Haeckel to add a third living kingdom (a fourth kingdom in toto) to the Animale, Vegetabile (and Lapideum meaning Mineral) of Linnaeus: the Kingdom Protista.

== History of knowledge ==
=== Early observations ===
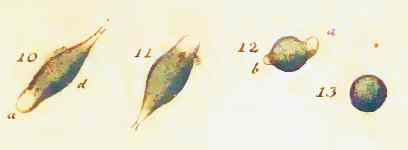
Cercaria viridis (= E. viridis) from O.F. Müller's Animalcula Infusoria. 1786

Species of Euglena were among the first protists to be seen under the microscope. In 1674, in a letter to the Royal Society, the Dutch pioneer of microscopy Antonie van Leeuwenhoek wrote that he had collected water samples from an inland lake, in which he found "animalcules" that were "green in the middle, and before and behind white." Clifford Dobell regards it as "almost certain" that these were Euglena viridis, whose "peculiar arrangement of chromatophores...gives the flagellate this appearance at low magnification." Twenty two years later, John Harris published a brief series of "Microscopical Observations" reporting that he had examined "a small Drop of the Green Surface of some Puddle-Water" and found it to be "altogether composed of Animals of several Shapes and Magnitudes." Among them, were "oval creatures whose middle part was of a Grass Green, but each end Clear and Transparent," which "would contract and dilate themselves, tumble over and over many times together, and then shoot away like Fish."

In 1786, O.F. Müller gave a more complete description of the organism, which he named Cercaria viridis, noting its distinctive color and changeable body shape. Müller also provided a series of illustrations, accurately depicting the undulating, contractile movements (metaboly) of the cell body. In 1830, C. G. Ehrenberg renamed Müller's Cercaria Euglena viridis, and placed it, in keeping with the short-lived system of classification he invented, among the Polygastrica in the family Astasiaea: multi-stomached "creatures" with no alimentary canal, variable body shape but no pseudopods or lorica. By making use of the newly invented achromatic microscope, Ehrenberg was able to see Euglena's eyespot, which he correctly identified as a "rudimentary eye" (although he reasoned, wrongly, that this meant the "creature" also had a nervous system). This feature was incorporated into Ehrenberg's name for the new genus, constructed from the Greek roots "eu-" (well, good) and glēnē (eyeball, socket of joint).

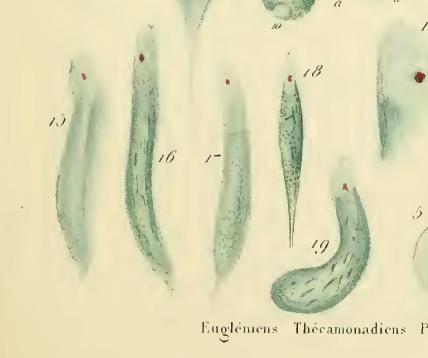
Euglena from Félix Dujardin's Histoire Naturelle des Zoophytes, 1841

Ehrenberg did not notice Euglena's flagella, however. The first to publish a record of this feature was Félix Dujardin, who added "filament flagelliforme" to the descriptive criteria of the genus in 1841. Subsequently, the class Flagellata (Cohn, 1853) was created for "creatures", like Euglena, possessing one or more flagella. While "Flagellata" has fallen from use as a taxon, the notion of using flagella as a phylogenetic criterion remains vigorous.

=== Recent classification ===
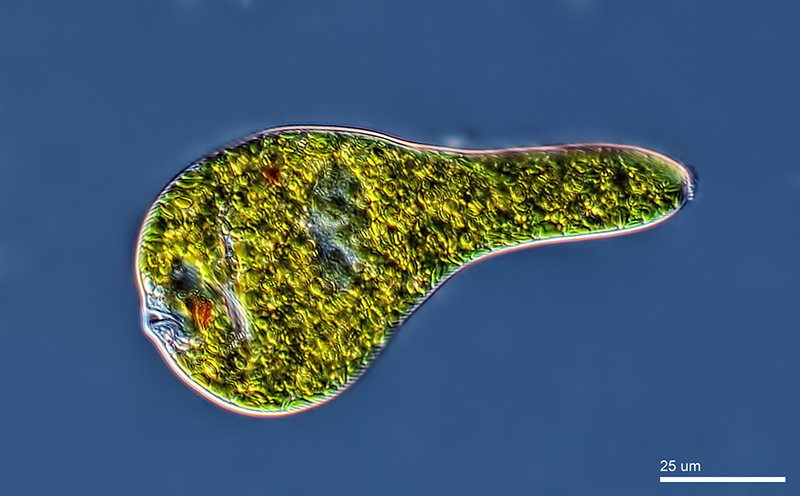
Euglenoid movement, known as metaboly

In 1881, Georg Klebs made a primary taxonomic distinction between green and colorless flagellate organisms, separating photosynthetic from heterotrophic euglenoids. The latter (largely colorless, shape-changing uniflagellates) were divided among the Astasiaceae and the Peranemaceae, while flexible green euglenoids were generally assigned to the genus Euglena.

As early as 1935, it was recognized that this was an artificial grouping, however convenient. In 1948, Pringsheim affirmed that the distinction between green and colorless flagellates had little taxonomic justification, although he acknowledged its practical appeal. He proposed something of a compromise, placing colorless, saprotrophic euglenoids in the genus Astasia, while allowing some colorless euglenoids to share a genus with their photosynthesizing cousins, provided they had structural features that proved common ancestry. Among the green euglenoids themselves, Pringsheim recognized the close kinship of some species of Phacus and Lepocinclis with some species of Euglena.

By the 1950s, when A. Hollande published a major revision of the phylum, organisms were classified by shared structural features, such as the number and type of flagella. In the 1970s, it was hypothesized that photosynthetic euglenoids derived their chloroplasts by engulfing an algal cell and took its photosynthetic machinery. This secondary endosymbiosis hypothesis was later confirmed through molecular evidence, and it appears that the photosynthetic euglenoids are grouped into one clade. However, genetic analysis of the non-photosynthesizing euglenoid Astasia longa confirmed that this organism retains sequences of DNA inherited from an ancestor that must have had functioning chloroplasts; therefore, some once-photosynthetic lineages must have later lost the chloroplasts. Recognizing the non-monophyletic nature of the genus Euglena, Marin et al. (2003) have revised it to include certain members traditionally placed in Astasia and Khawkinea.

Throughout its taxonomic history, Euglena served as a "holding bag" for species that did not morphologically fit into other groups. This made Euglena a heterogeneous assemblage, and made correct species identification very difficult. Some researchers proposed intra-generic groups within Euglena; for example Pringsheim (1956) named five groups (Rigidae, Lentiferae, Catilliferae, Radiatae, Serpentes) based on cell shape and chloroplast morphology, while Zakryś (1986) named three subgenera (Euglena, Calliglena and Discoglena) based on chloroplast and paramylon morphology. However, molecular phylogenetics once again showed that these groups did not always correspond to evolutionary lineages. To revise this, taxonomists have transferred species out of Euglena and into other genera, including Lepocinclis, Phacus, and the newly proposed genera Discoplastis, Euglenaria, and Euglenaformis.

== Form and function ==
When feeding as a heterotroph, Euglena takes in nutrients by osmotrophy, and can survive without light on a diet of organic matter, such as beef extract, peptone, acetate, ethanol or carbohydrates. When there is sufficient sunlight for it to feed by phototrophy, it uses chloroplasts containing the pigments chlorophyll a and chlorophyll b to produce sugars by photosynthesis. Euglena's chloroplasts are surrounded by three membranes, while those of plants and the green algae (among which earlier taxonomists often placed Euglena) have only two membranes. This fact has been taken as morphological evidence that Euglena's chloroplasts evolved from a eukaryotic green alga. Thus, the similarities between Euglena and plants would have arisen not because of kinship but because of a secondary endosymbiosis. Molecular phylogenetic analysis has lent support to this hypothesis, and it is now generally accepted.

Euglena chloroplasts contain pyrenoids, used in the synthesis of paramylon, a form of starch energy storage enabling Euglena to survive periods of light deprivation. The presence of pyrenoids is used as an identifying feature of the genus, separating it from other euglenoids, such as Lepocinclis and Phacus. Pyrenoids may be surrounded by a single paramylon cap (these pyrenoids are called haplopyrenoids), a bilateral paramylon cap (these are called diplopyrenoids), or a cluster of small paramylon grains (called a paramylon center), or may be "naked" and lack associated paramylon bodies.

Chloroplast morphology in Euglena is diverse, and can be broadly divided into four groups. The first group consists of E. archaeoplastidiata, which has a single, parietal chloroplast with two diplopyrenoids. The second group (e.g. E. viridis) has axial, stellate chloroplasts with paramylon center. The third group has parietal, lobed chloroplasts, each with a naked, haplo- or diplopyrenoid; this group is very diverse and identification may be difficult. The fourth group (e.g. E. sanguinea) has plate-like, parietal chloroplasts each with a single diplopyrenoid. The chloroplast centers are located deep within the cell, and the chloroplasts are deeply dissected into long bands, which follow the spiral contours of the cell.

Euglena have two flagella rooted in basal bodies located in a small reservoir at the front of the cell. Typically, one flagellum is very short, and does not protrude from the cell, while the other is long enough to be seen with light microscopy. In some species, such as Euglena mutabilis, both flagella are "non-emergent"—entirely confined to the interior of the cell's reservoir—and consequently cannot be seen in the light microscope. In species that possess a long, emergent flagellum, it may be used to help the organism swim. The surface of the flagellum is coated with about 30,000 extremely fine filaments called mastigonemes.

Like other euglenoids, Euglena possess a red eyespot, an organelle composed of carotenoid pigment granules. The red spot itself is not thought to be photosensitive. Rather, it filters the sunlight that falls on a light-detecting structure at the base of the flagellum (a swelling, known as the paraflagellar body), allowing only certain wavelengths of light to reach it. As the cell rotates with respect to the light source, the eyespot partially blocks the source, permitting the Euglena to find the light and move toward it (a process known as phototaxis).

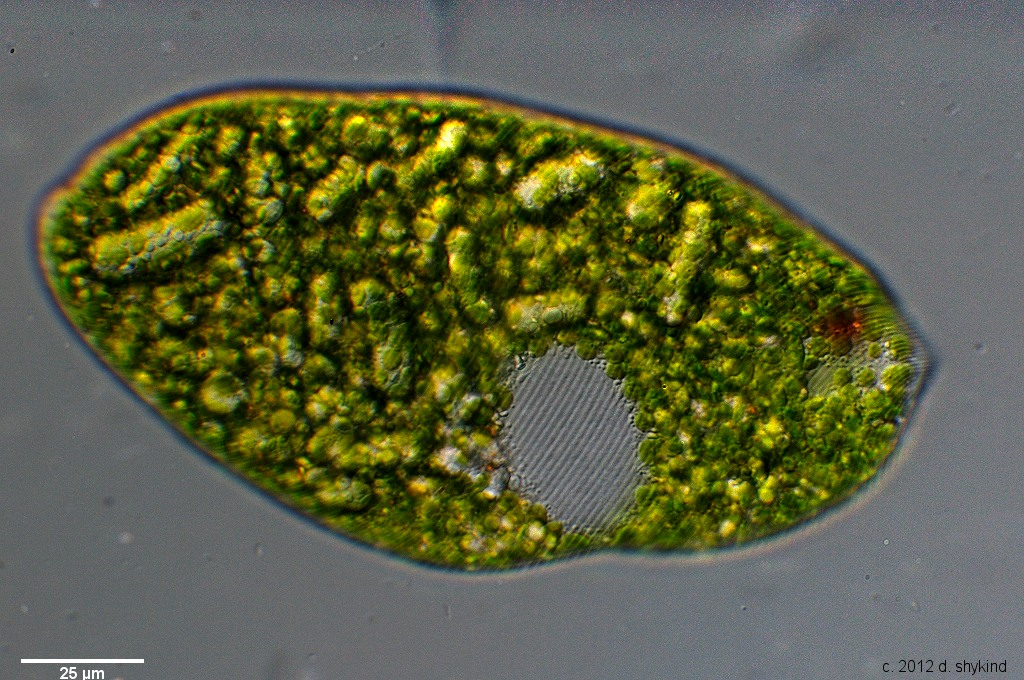
Spiral pellicle strips

Euglena lacks a cell wall. Instead, it has a pellicle made up of a protein layer supported by a substructure of microtubules, arranged in strips spiraling around the cell. The action of these pellicle strips sliding over one another, known as metaboly, gives Euglena its exceptional flexibility and contractility. The mechanism of this euglenoid movement is not understood, but its molecular basis may be similar to that of amoeboid movement. Some species have mucocysts, which are membrane-bound bodies containing mucilaginous threads. Mucocysts are located underneath the pellicle in parallel rows following the arrangement of pellicle strips. Their presence or absence and shape (spherical or spindle-shaped) are an important diagnostic for species-level identification, but are mostly only visible after staining with a dye such as neutral red.

In low moisture conditions, or when food is scarce, Euglena forms a protective wall around itself and lies dormant as a resting cyst until environmental conditions improve.

Euglenid Body Plan: 1. Dorsal flagellum; 2. Axoneme; 3. Paraflagellar rod; 4. Mastigonemes, "hairs" attached to flagellum; 5. Flagellar pocket vestibulum; 6. Feeding apparatus; 7. Paraxial swelling; 8. Eyespot, photoreceptor used to sense light direction and intensity; 9. Contractile vacuole, regulates the quantity of water inside a cell; 10. Ventral flagellum; 11. Ventral root; 12. Golgi apparatus; modifies proteins and sends them out of the cell; 13. Endoplasmic reticulum, the transport network for molecules going to specific parts of the cell; 14. Phagosome; 15. Lysosome, holds enzymes; 16. Nucleus; 17. Nucleolus; 18. Plastid membranes (3, secondary); 19. Thylakoids, site of the light-dependent reactions of photosynthesis; 20. Pyrenoid, center of carbon fixation; 21. Paramylon granules; 22. Pellicular strip; 23. Muciferous body/Mucocyst; 24. Mitochondrion, creates ATP (energy) for the cell (discoid cristae)

== Reproduction ==
Euglena reproduce asexually through binary fission, a form of cell division. Reproduction begins with the mitosis of the cell nucleus, followed by the division of the cell itself. Euglena divide longitudinally, beginning at the front end of the cell, with the duplication of flagellar processes, gullet and stigma. Presently, a cleavage forms in the anterior, and a V-shaped bifurcation gradually moves toward the posterior, until the two halves are entirely separated.

Reports of sexual conjugation are rare, and have not been substantiated.

== Uses ==
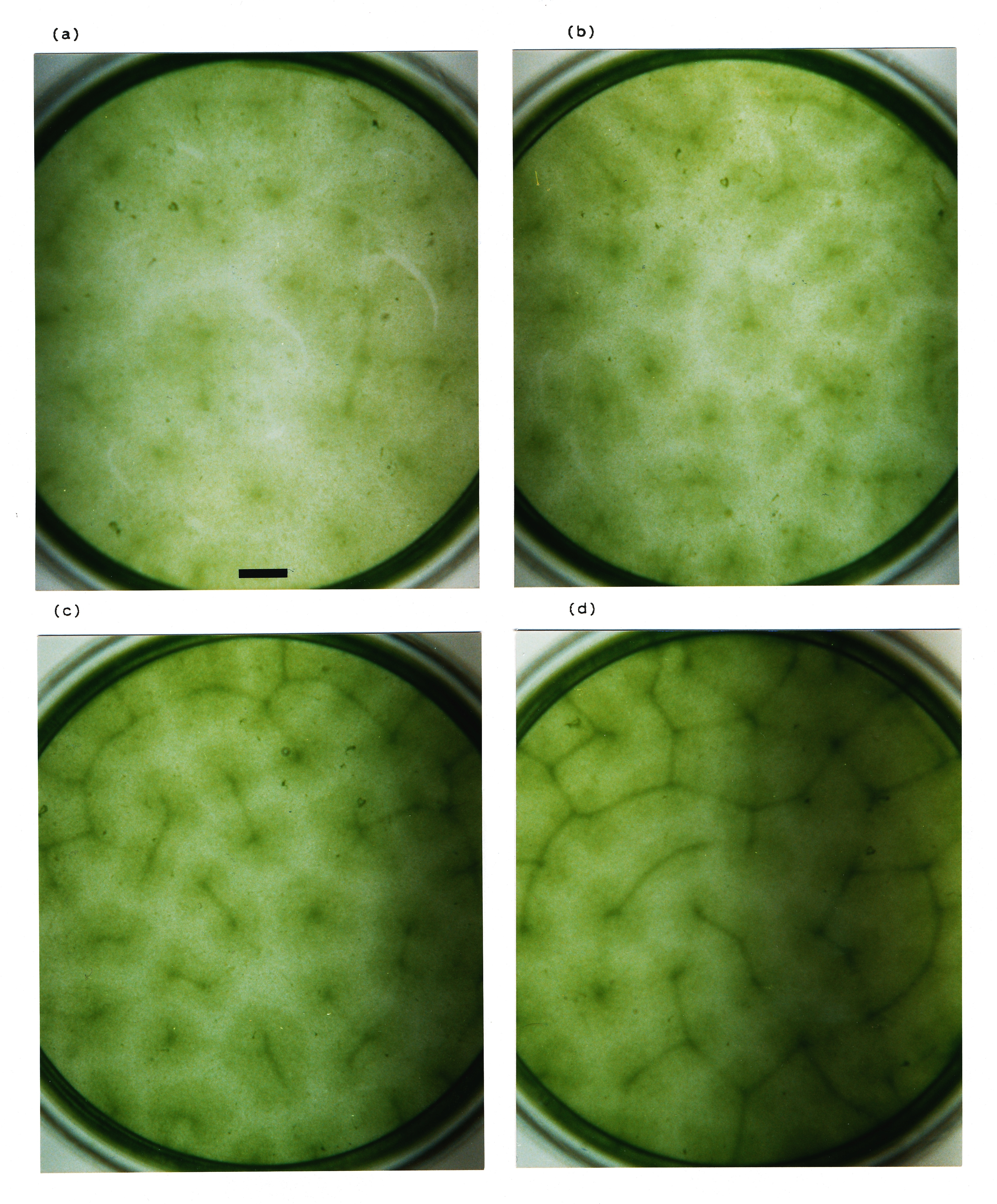
Cultures of Euglena in a Petri dish

Euglena has been used extensively as a model organism. It is capable of both heterotrophic and photosynthetic growth, meaning it can be grown in both light and dark conditions and it is thus relatively easy to cultivate. Euglena was one of the first photosynthetic organisms to have its chloroplast genome sequenced, and the chloroplast of Euglena has been extensively studied in the fields of biochemistry, cell biology and molecular biology. In 2015, Ellis O'Neill and Professor Rob Field have sequenced the transcriptome of Euglena gracilis, which provides information about all of the genes that the organism is actively using. They found that Euglena gracilis has a whole host of new, unclassified genes which can make new forms of carbohydrates and natural products. In addition, Euglena is commonly used in classrooms to demonstrate important biological processes, such as photosynthesis, or population growth.

The taste of powdered Euglena is described as dried sardine flakes, and contains minerals, vitamins and docosahexaenoic acid, an omega-3 acid. The powder is used as ingredient in other foods. Kemin Industries sells a euglena nutraceutical supplement ingredient featuring dried Euglena gracilis with high levels of beta glucan.

The lipid content of Euglena (mainly wax esters) is seen as a promising feedstock for production of biodiesel and jet fuel. Under the aegis of Itochu, a start-up company called Euglena Co., Ltd. has completed a refinery plant in Yokohama in 2018, with a production capacity of 125 kiloliters of bio jet fuel and biodiesel per year.

== Video gallery ==
Red Euglena sp.

Euglena mutabilis, showing metaboly, paramylon bodies and chloroplasts

Euglena sanguinea

Euglena, moving by metaboly and swimming

== See also ==
- Elysia chlorotica, an animal with chloroplasts derived from algae
- Kleptoplasty
