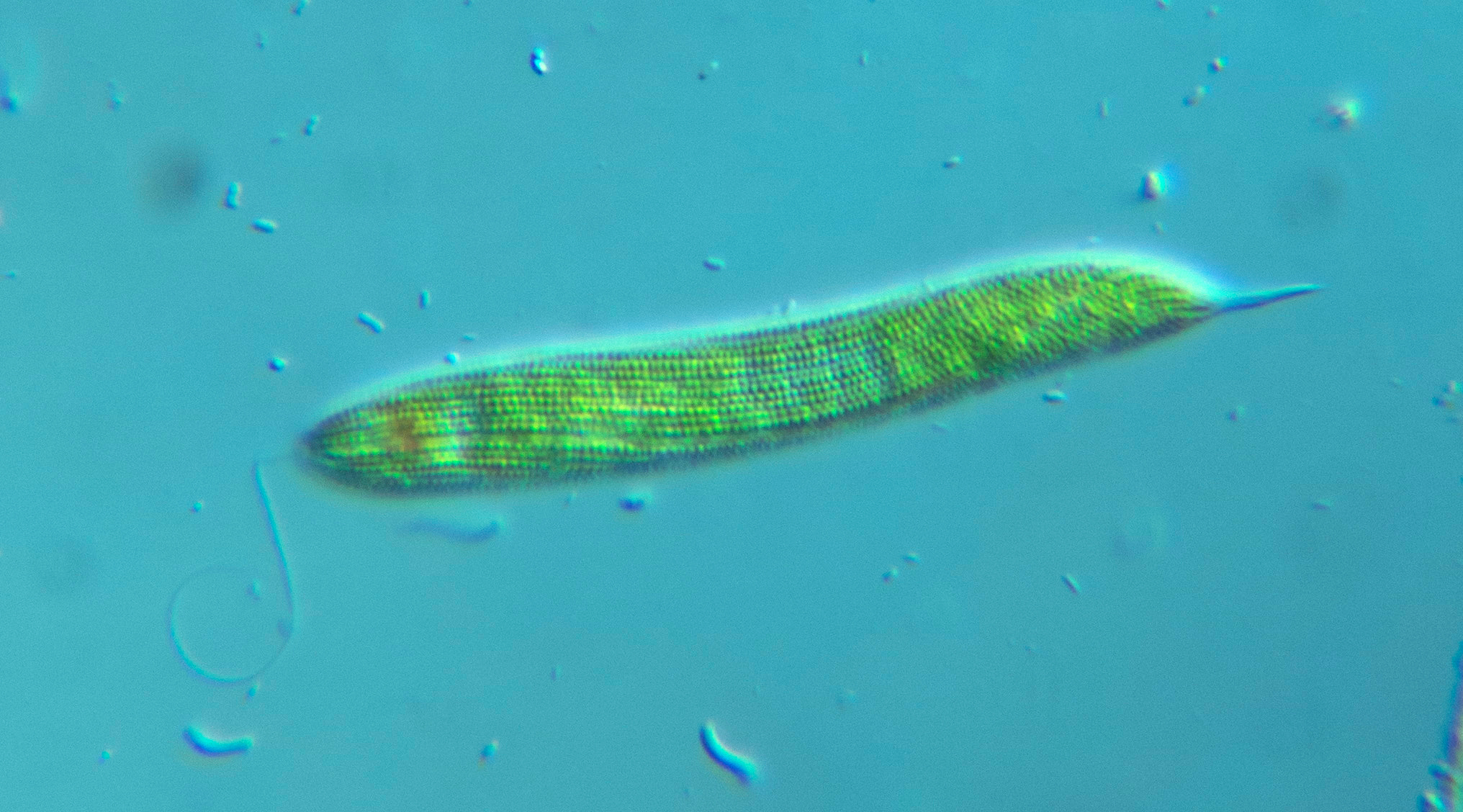
- Lepocinclis tripteris

Scientific classification
- Domain: Eukaryota
- Clade: Discoba
- Phylum: Euglenozoa
- Class: Euglenida
- Clade: Euglenophyceae
- Order: Euglenales
- Family: Phacaceae
- Genus: Lepocinclis; Perty, 1849

Type species
- Lepocinclis globulus Perty

= Lepocinclis =

Genus of algae

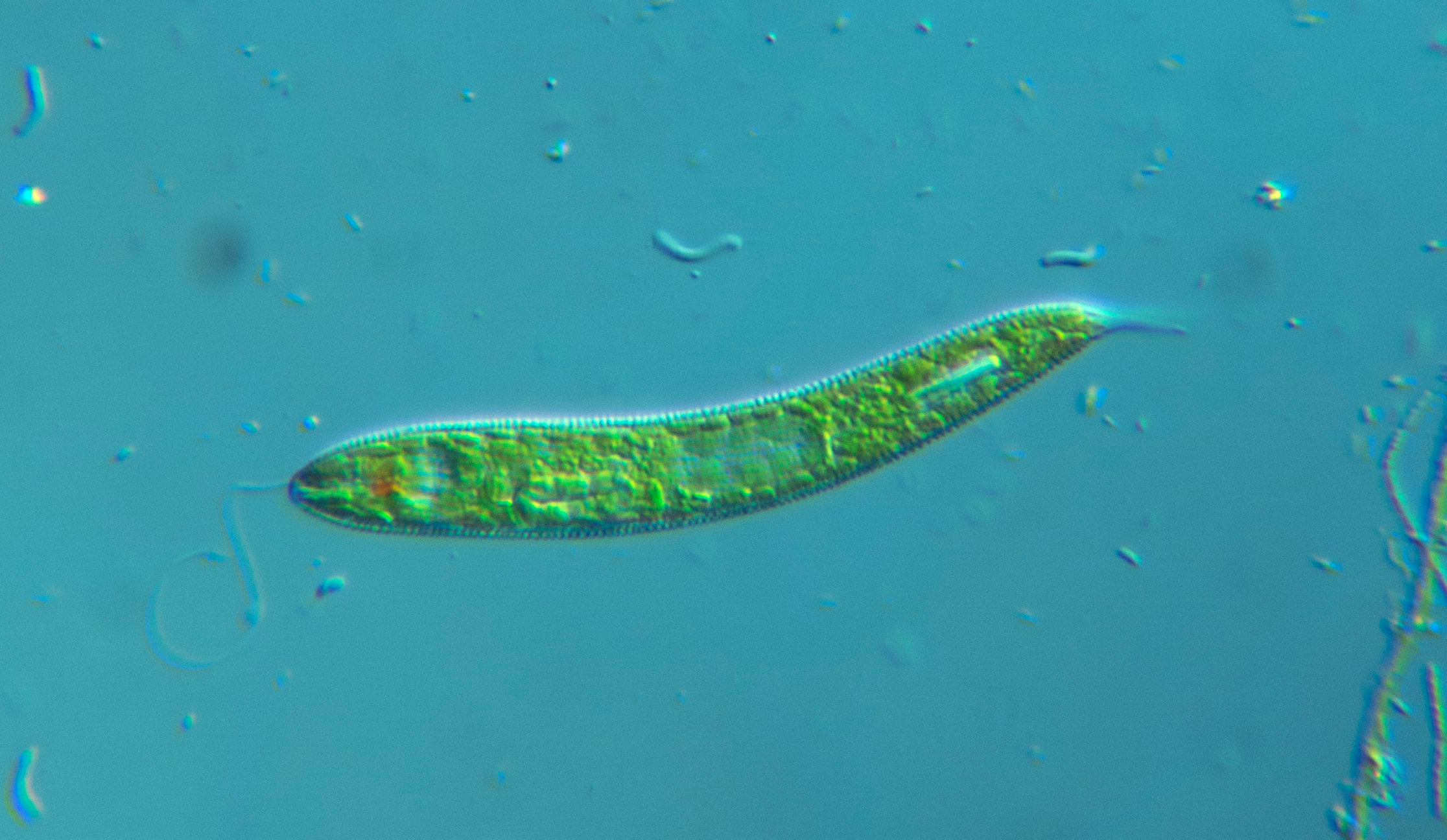
Lepocinclis tripteris

Lepocinclis is a genus of algae belonging to the family Phacaceae. The genus has a cosmopolitan distribution, and is primarily part of the plankton in freshwater habitats (rarely brackish ones).

== Description ==
Lepocinclis consists of single, free-swimming cells, with the flagella, eyespot (stigma), and flagellar swelling similar to that of Euglena. The cells are rigid or semi-rigid (they may bend somewhat, but are not metabolic). The cell shape is variable but species-specific: they may be ovoid, fusiform, cylindrical, sometimes twisted; the cell is usually not flattened (rarely flattened or triangular) in cross section. Cells often with a tapering posterior spine; the cell is surrounded by a pellicle with spiral striations. Cells are typically filled with numerous small, discoid chloroplasts without pyrenoids, which give the cell a green color. A few species have secondarily lost their chloroplasts, and are therefore colorless. Cells are also filled with paramylon grains, of two different sizes (dimorphic); the large paramylon grains are ring-shaped or rod-shaped.

== Taxonomy ==
The circumscription and species-level taxonomy of Lepocinclis has changed significantly with molecular phylogenetic analyses. For example, in 2003 some elongate species with a semi-rigid pellicle were transferred to Lepocinclis, such as Lepocinclis acus. These species were formerly considered to be part of the genus Euglena, subgenus Rigidae sensu Pringsheim. Another change involved the genus Cyclidiopsis, which differed from Lepocinclis sensu stricto in having colorless cells (no chloroplasts). Cyclidiopsis was found to be included within the clade of Lepocinclis, and thus made a synonym.

Species delimitation involves morphological characters such as the shape and size of cells, and the number and shape of paramylon grains.

The following species are recognized in the genus Lepocinclis:

- Lepocinclis acicularis
- Lepocinclis acus (O.F.Müll.) B.Marin & Melkonian
- Lepocinclis acuta Prescott
- Lepocinclis americana Conforti
- Lepocinclis autumnalis Chu
- Lepocinclis boseensis Xie et al.
- Lepocinclis capito Wehrle
- Lepocinclis caudata (A.M.Cunha) W.Conrad
- Lepocinclis claviformis Conforti
- Lepocinclis constricta Matvienko
- Lepocinclis cyclindrica
- Lepocinclis cylindrica (Korshikov) Deflandre
- Lepocinclis fusca (G.A.Klebs) Kosmala & Zakryś
- Lepocinclis fusiformis (H.J.Carter) Lemmerm.
- Lepocinclis glabra Drezepolski, 1925
- Lepocinclis globosa Francé
- Lepocinclis globulus Perty
- Lepocinclis gracilicauda Defl.
- Lepocinclis helicoidea (C.Bernard) M.S.Bennett & Triemer
- Lepocinclis longistriata Chu, 1936
- Lepocinclis mammillata A.M.Cunha
- Lepocinclis marssonii Lemmerm.
- Lepocinclis nayali W.Conrad
- Lepocinclis ovum (Ehrenb.) Lemmerm.
- Lepocinclis oxyuris (Schmarda) B.Marin & Melkonian
- Lepocinclis paxilliformis Playfair
- Lepocinclis piriformis A.M.Cunha
- Lepocinclis playfairiana Deflandre
- Lepocinclis pseudo-ovum W.Conrad
- Lepocinclis redekei Conrad, 1934
- Lepocinclis reeuwykiana
- Lepocinclis salina F.E.Fritsch
- Lepocinclis spirogyra Korshikov
- Lepocinclis spirogyroides B.Marin & Melkonian
- Lepocinclis spiroides (Lemmerm.) B.Marin & Melkonian
- Lepocinclis steinii Lemmerm.
- Lepocinclis teres (F.Schmitz) Francé
- Lepocinclis tripteris (Dujard.) B.Marin & Melkonian
- Lepocinclis truncata A.M.Cunha
- Lepocinclis turbiniformis Deflandre
- Lepocinclis wangii S.P.Chu
