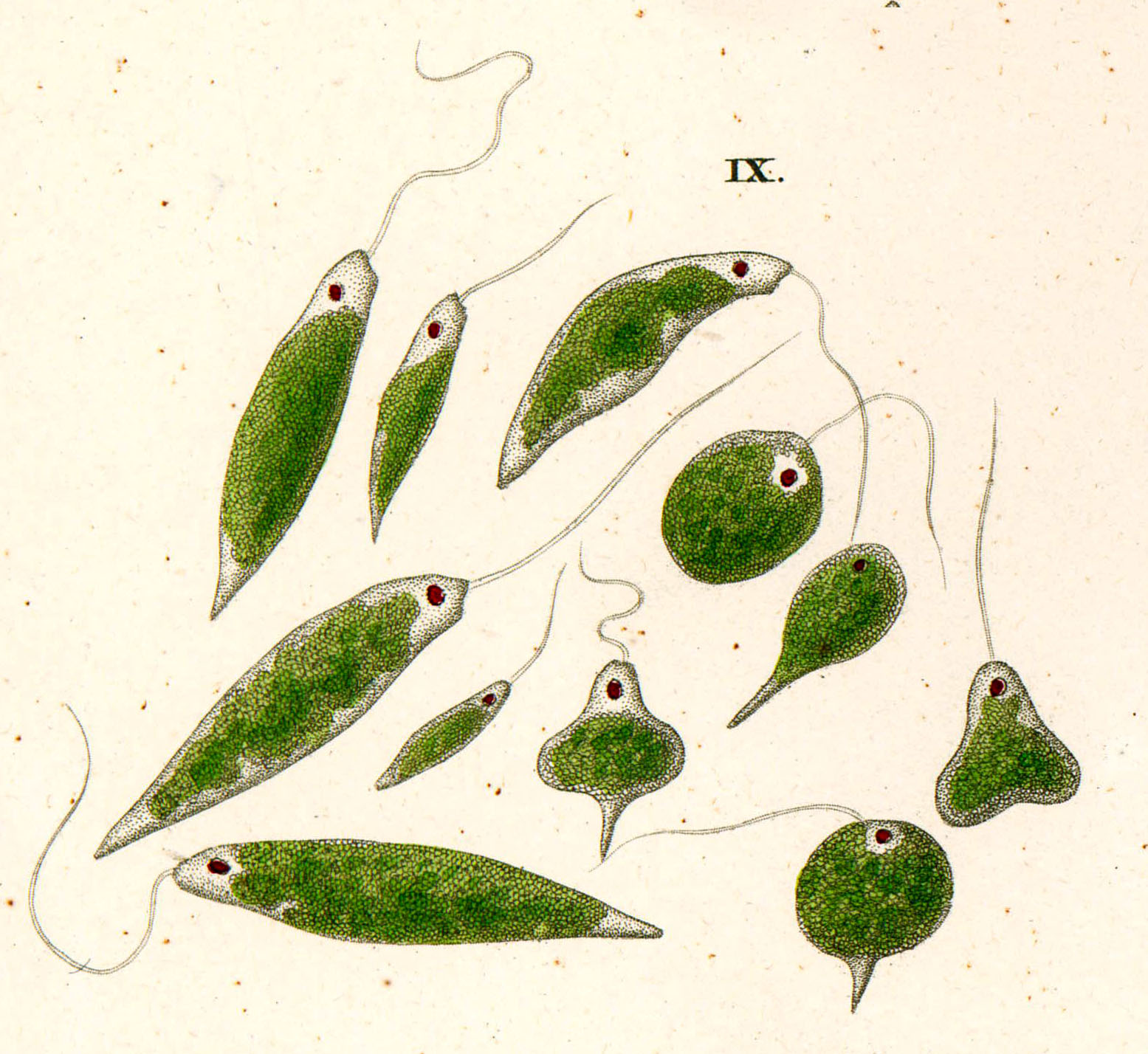
- Euglena viridis, by Ehrenberg

Scientific classification
- Domain: Eukaryota
- Phylum: Euglenozoa
- Class: Euglenida
- Clade: Spirocuta
- Clade: Euglenophyceae; Schoenichen, 1925 emend. Marin & Melkonian, 2003

Subgroups
- Rapazida; Euglenophycidae; Euglenales; Eutreptiales; And see text

Synonyms
- Euglenea Butschli, 1884 emend. Busse & Preisfeld, 2002

= Euglenophyceae =

Unicellular algae

Euglenophyceae (ICNafp, proposed as a class) or Euglenea (ICZN, proposed as a class) is an unranked clade of single-celled algae belonging to the phylum Euglenozoa. They have chloroplasts originated from an event of secondary endosymbiosis with a green alga. They are distinguished from other algae by the presence of paramylon as a storage product and three membranes surrounding each chloroplast.

== Description ==
Euglenophyceae are unicellular algae, protists that contain chloroplasts. Their chloroplasts originated from a secondary endosymbiosis with a green alga, particularly from the order Pyramimonadales, and contain chlorophylls a and b. Some have secondarily lost this ability and evolved toward osmotrophy. In addition to photosynthetic plastids, most species have a photosensitive eyespot.

== Ecology ==
Euglenophyceae are mainly present in the water column of freshwater habitats. They are abundant in small eutrophic water bodies of temperate climates, where they are capable of forming blooms, including toxic blooms such as those caused by Euglena sanguinea. In tropical climate, blooms are common in ponds. In marine environments they have been reported in a lower amount. Some species are capable of migrating vertically through the sand along with the cycles of ocean tides. Two lineages of Euglenophyceae are part of the marine plankton: Rapazida and Eutreptiales. Eutreptiales can amount up to 46% of the total phytoplankton biomass when blooming in eutrophic coastal waters.

== Classification ==
- - Euglenales
    - - - - - - "Phacus"
              - Lepocinclis
            - Phacus limnophila
          - Discoplastis
        - Euglenaria
      - - - Cryptoglena
          - Monomorphina
        - - Euglenaformis
          - Colacium
    - - - "Trachelomonas"
        - Strombomonas
      - Euglena
  - Eutreptiales
    - Eutreptia
    - Eutreptiella
- - Rapazida
    Rapaza

Cladogram of Euglenophyceae genera, based on a 18S rDNA phylogenetic analysis published in 2022.

Euglenophyceae encompasses three taxonomic groups: the mixotrophic Rapaza viridis and two mainly phototrophic orders, Euglenales and Eutreptiales. The classification is as follows (species numbers based on AlgaeBase):

- Order Euglenales Leedale, 1967 emend. Marin & Melkonian, 2003
  - Family Euglenaceae [Euglenidae] Dujardin, 1841 emend. Kim et al., 2010
    - Colacium Ehrenberg, 1834 – 17 spp.
    - Cryptoglena Ehrenberg, 1831 – 11 spp.
    - Euglena Ehrenberg, 1830 – 174 spp.
    - Euglenaformis Bennett & Triemer, 2014 – 3 spp.
    - Euglenaria Karnkowska, Linton & Kwiatowski, 2010 – 4 spp.
    - Monomorphina Mereschkowsky, 1877 – 17 spp.
    - Strombomonas Deflandre, 1930 – 99 spp.
    - Trachelomonas Ehrenberg, 1834 – 410 spp.
  - Family Phacaceae [Phacidae] Kim, Triemer & Shin, 2010
    - Discoplastis Triemer, 2006 – 6 spp.
    - Flexiglena Zakryś & Łukomska, 2020 – 1 sp.
    - Lepocinclis Perty, 1849 – 90 spp.
    - Phacus Dujardin, 1841 – 188 spp.
- Order Eutreptiales
  - Family Eutreptiaceae [Eutreptiidae] Hollande, 1942
    - Eutreptia Perty, 1852 – 11 spp.
    - Eutreptiella da Cunha, 1914 – 9 spp.
- Order Rapazida Cavalier-Smith, 2016
  - Family Rapazidae Cavalier-Smith, 2016
    - Rapaza Yamaguchi, Yubuki & Leander, 2012 – 1 sp.

Several genera assigned to Euglenophyceae are considered incertae sedis, because the lack of genetic data makes their phylogenetic position unresolved:

- Ascoglena Stein, 1878 – 4 spp.
- Euglenamorpha Wenrich, 1924 – 2 spp.
- Euglenopsis Klebs, 1892 – 11 spp.
- Glenoclosterium Carter, 1869 – 1 sp.
- Hegneria Brumpt & Lavier, 1924 – 1 sp.
- Klebsina Silva, 1961 – 1 sp.
- Euglenocapsa Steinecke, 1932 – 1 sp.
- Menoidium Perty, 1852 – 28 spp.
- Parmidium Christen, 1962 – 10 spp.
