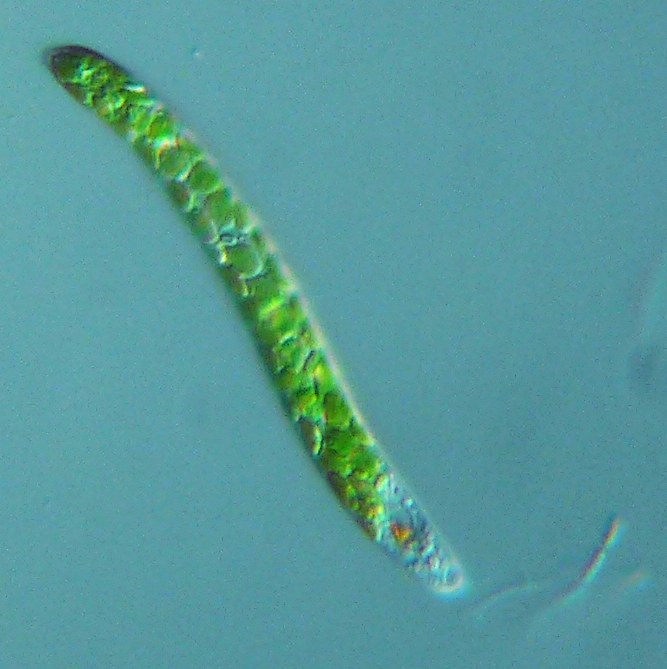
- Euglena mutabilis

Scientific classification
- Domain: Eukaryota
- Clade: Discoba
- Phylum: Euglenozoa
- Class: Euglenida
- Clade: Euglenophyceae
- Order: Euglenales
- Family: Euglenaceae; Dujardin, 1841

Type genus
- Euglena Ehrenberg, 1830

Genera
- Colacium; Cryptoglena; Euglena; Euglenaformis; Euglenaria; Monomorphina; Strombomonas; Trachelomonas

= Euglenaceae =

Family of flagellate eukaryotes

Euglenaceae (also known as Euglenidae) is a family of flagellates in the phylum Euglenozoa. The family includes the most well-known euglenoid genus, Euglena.

== Nomenclature ==
The family Euglenaceae is also known by the name Euglenidae. The origin of this dual naming system is because of the history of protists. Euglenids have been treated as both algae and protozoans, which are governed by separate nomenclature codes. If treated as an alga, it would fall under the International Code of Nomenclature for algae, fungi, and plants (ICN) and its correct name would be Euglenaceae; if treated under the International Code of Zoological Nomenclature (ICZN) it is called Euglenidae. Euglenids such as these are considered to be ambiregnal protists due to their parallel naming systems.

== Morphology ==
Euglenaceae show the most morphological diversity within the class Euglenophyceae. They are mostly single-celled organisms, except for the genus Colacium. They are free-living or sometimes inhabiting the digestive tracts of animals. Two genera, Strombomonas and Trachelomonas produce outer shells called loricae.

As with other euglenids, cells in the Euglenaceae are surrounded by a series of proteinaceous strips called the pellicle; the pellicle can stretch in most genera, allowing the cell to contract, creating a type of movement called metaboly. The genus Monomorphina is rigid or slightly metabolic. Chloroplasts are present in most species, except for a few species that have lost them. Chloroplasts are diverse in this family, with the size, shape, number, and presence of pyrenoids being important identifying characteristics.

== Phylogeny ==
In its current circumscription, Euglenaceae is monophyletic. Its sister family is Phacaceae, which contains several genera (Lepocinclis, Phacus, and Discoplastis) formerly included within Euglenaceae. Two phylogenies are shown below.

=== Kim et al. (2010) ===
In this phylogeny, most Euglena species are sister to a clade consisting of Euglenaria and Euglena archaeoplastidiata.

- Euglenales
  - Euglenaceae
    - - - - Euglena pro parte
          - - Euglenaria
            - Euglena archaeoplastidiata
        - - Cryptoglena
          - Monomorphina
      - - - Strombomonas
          - Trachelomonas
        - - Colacium
          - Euglena velata
    - Euglenaformis
  - Phacaceae (outgroup)

=== Bicudo & Menezes (2016) ===
This phylogeny places Euglena as sister to all other genera in Euglenaceae except for the genus Euglenaformis.

- Euglenales
  - Euglenaceae
    - - Euglena pro parte
      - - - - - Cryptoglena
              - Monomorphina
            - Euglenaria
          - Euglena archaeoplastidiata
        - - - Strombomonas
            - Trachelomonas
          - Colacium
    - Euglenaformis
  - Phacaceae (outgroup)
