= Phytoglycogen =

Phytoglycogen is a type of glycogen extracted from plants. It is a highly branched, water-soluble polysaccharide derived from glucose.

Phytoglycogen is a highly branched polysaccharide used to store glucose in a similar way that glycogen is the glucose storage for animals. It is made up of branched, flexible chains on glucose molecules that grow similarly to synthetic dendrimers. The special structure of the phytoglycogen allows it to have low viscosity, high water retention, as well as high stability in water, and stabilize bioactive compounds and form films on surfaces. Thus, this monodisperse nanoparticle is able to be used in many different technologies.
