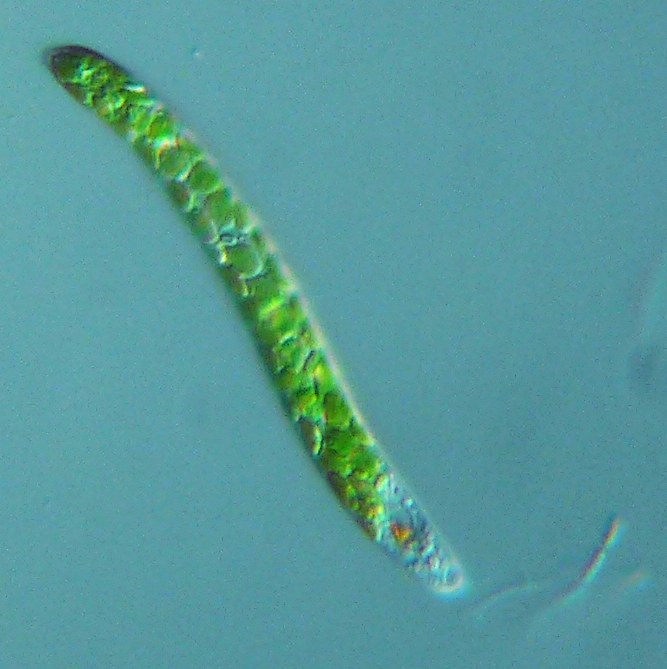
- Euglena mutabilis

Scientific classification
- Domain: Eukaryota
- Clade: Discoba
- Phylum: Euglenozoa
- Class: Euglenida
- Clade: Euglenophyceae
- Order: Euglenales; F.Stein, 1878

Families
- Euglenaceae; Phacaceae

= Euglenales =

Order of flagellate eukaryotes

Euglenales (also known as Euglenida) is an order of flagellates in the phylum Euglenozoa. The family includes the most well-known euglenoid genus, Euglena, as well as other common genera like Phacus and Lepocinclis.

== Nomenclature ==
The order Euglenales is also known by the name Euglenida. The origin of this dual naming system is because of the history of protists. Euglenids have been treated as both algae and protozoans, which are governed by separate nomenclature codes. If classified as an alga, it would fall under the International Code of Botanical Nomenclature (ICBN) and its correct name would be Euglenales; if classified as a protozoan, it would fall under the International Code of Zoological Nomenclature (ICZN) and would be called Euglenida. Euglenids such as these are considered to be ambiregnal protists due to their parallel naming systems.

== Description ==
Euglenales consists mostly of freshwater organisms, in contrast to its sister Eutreptiales which is generally marine. Cells have two flagella, but only one is emergent; the other is very short and does not emerge from the cell, so cells appear to have only one flagellum. In comparison, Eutreptiales is characterized by two emergent flagella.

== Phylogeny ==
In its current circumscription, Euglenales is monophyletic, consisting of two sister clades corresponding to Euglenaceae and Phacaceae.

A cladogram representing the phylogenetic relationships is shown below:

- Photosynthetic euglenoids
  - - Euglenales
      - Euglenaceae
      - Phacaceae
    - Eutreptiales
  - Rapazida
