= Paramylon =

Names
- Other names β-D-(1→3)-Glucan

Identifiers
| CAS Number | 51052-65-4 |

Properties
| Chemical formula | (C_{6}H_{10}O_{5})_{n} |
| Molar mass | Variable |
- Except where otherwise noted, data are given for materials in their standard state (at 25 °C [77 °F], 100 kPa). Infobox references

Paramylon is a carbohydrate similar to starch. The chloroplasts found in Euglena contain chlorophyll which aids in the synthesis of carbohydrates to be stored as starch granules and paramylon.

== Overview ==
Paramylon is made in the pyrenoids of Euglena. The euglenoids have chlorophylls a and b and they store their photosynthate in an unusual form called paramylon starch, a β-1,3 polymer of glucose. The paramylon is stored in rod like bodies throughout the cytoplasm, called paramylon bodies, which are often visible as colorless or white particles in light microscopy. Their shape is often characteristic of the Euglena species that produces them. Paramylon is also reportedly made in granuales by Pavlovophyceae haptophytes.

Paramylon was named and first described in detail by Johann Gottlieb in 1850 based on Gottlieb's scientific exchange with Ludwig Karl Schmarda.

== See also ==
- Phytoglycogen
