= Marine primary production =

Marine synthesis of organic compounds

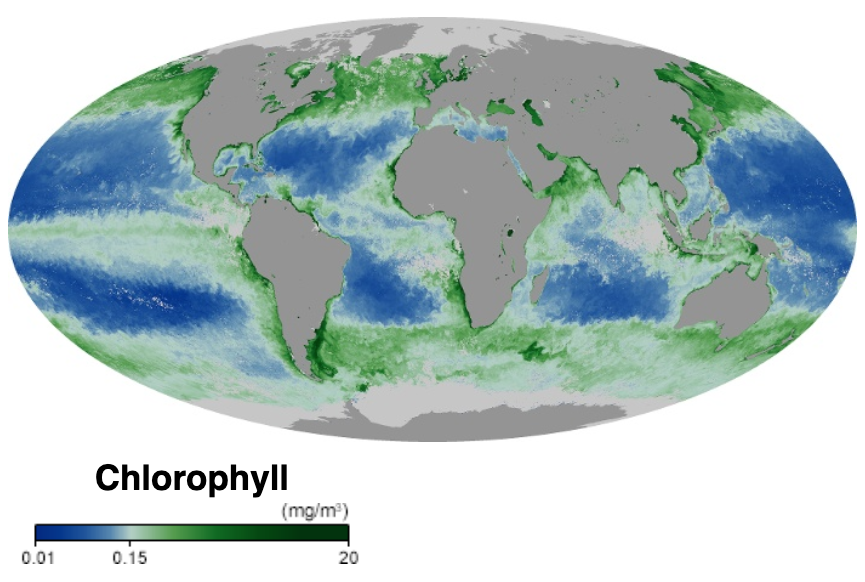
Ocean chlorophyll concentration as a proxy for marine primary production. Green indicates where there are a lot of phytoplankton, while blue indicates where there are few phytoplankton. – NASA Earth Observatory 2019.

Marine primary production is the chemical synthesis in the ocean of organic compounds from atmospheric or dissolved carbon dioxide. It principally occurs through the process of photosynthesis, which uses light as its source of energy, but it also occurs through chemosynthesis, which uses the oxidation or reduction of inorganic chemical compounds as its source of energy. Almost all life on Earth relies directly or indirectly on primary production. The organisms responsible for primary production are called primary producers or autotrophs.

Most marine primary production is generated by a diverse collection of marine microorganisms called algae and cyanobacteria. Together these form the principal primary producers at the base of the ocean food chain and produce half of the world's oxygen. Marine primary producers underpin almost all marine animal life by generating nearly all of the oxygen and food marine animals need to exist. Some marine primary producers are also ecosystem engineers which change the environment and provide habitats for other marine life.

Primary production in the ocean can be contrasted with primary production on land. Globally the ocean and the land each produce about the same amount of primary production, but in the ocean primary production comes mainly from cyanobacteria and algae, while on land it comes mainly from vascular plants.

Marine algae includes the largely invisible and often unicellular microalgae, which together with cyanobacteria form the ocean phytoplankton, as well as the larger, more visible and complex multicellular macroalgae commonly called seaweed. Seaweeds are found along coastal areas, living on the floor of continental shelves and washed up in intertidal zones. Some seaweeds drift with plankton in the sunlit surface waters (epipelagic zone) of the open ocean. Back in the Silurian, some phytoplankton evolved into red, brown and green algae. These algae then invaded the land and started evolving into the land plants we know today. Later in the Cretaceous some of these land plants returned to the sea as mangroves and seagrasses. These are found along coasts in intertidal regions and in the brackish water of estuaries. In addition, some seagrasses, like seaweeds, can be found at depths up to 50 metres on both soft and hard bottoms of the continental shelf.

== Overview ==
The rate of marine primary production is controlled primarily by light availability, nutrient supply, and temperature. In the sunlit surface layer of the ocean, photosynthesis by phytoplankton is generally limited by nutrient concentrations rather than light, while in deeper waters, low irradiance restricts production. Nitrogen, phosphorus, and in some regions, iron are the key limiting nutrients. Productivity is highest in coastal upwelling zones and high-latitude spring blooms, where nutrient availability is abundant, and lowest in subtropical gyres, which are characterized by strong stratification and low nutrient availability.

Marine primary production is measured as gross primary production (GPP), the total carbon fixed by photosynthesis, or as net primary production (NPP), which subtracts the carbon respired by primary producers themselves. Estimates are made using in-situ bottle incubations, satellite ocean-colour observations, and global biogeochemical models. Current analyses suggest that marine NPP averages about 45–55 gigatons of carbon per year, accounting for nearly half of Earth's total primary production. This production fluctuates across regions and time scales, influenced by phenomena such as the El Niño–Southern Oscillation, monsoons, and long-term shifts in ocean circulation.

== Marine primary producers ==
Seasonal changes in which phytoplankton type dominates – NASA click to animate This visualization indicates seasonal changes in which phytoplankton types dominated over the period 1994–1998. • Red = diatoms (big phytoplankton, which need silica) • Yellow = flagellates (other big phytoplankton) • Green = prochlorococcus (small phytoplankton that cannot use nitrate) • Cyan = synechococcus (other small phytoplankton) Opacity indicates concentration of the carbon biomass. In particular, the role of the swirls and filaments (mesoscale features) appear important in maintaining high biodiversity in the ocean.

Primary producers are the autotroph organisms that make their own food instead of eating other organisms. This means primary producers become the starting point in the food chain for heterotroph organisms that do eat other organisms. Some marine primary producers are specialised bacteria and archaea which are chemotrophs, making their own food by gathering around hydrothermal vents and cold seeps and using chemosynthesis. However, most marine primary production comes from organisms which use photosynthesis on the carbon dioxide dissolved in the water. This process uses energy from sunlight to convert water and carbon dioxide into sugars that can be used both as a source of chemical energy and of organic molecules that are used in the structural components of cells. Marine primary producers are important because they underpin almost all marine animal life by generating most of the oxygen and food that provide other organisms with the chemical energy they need to exist.

The principal marine primary producers are cyanobacteria, algae and marine plants. The oxygen released as a by-product of photosynthesis is needed by nearly all living things to carry out cellular respiration. In addition, primary producers are influential in the global carbon and water cycles. They stabilize coastal areas and can provide habitats for marine animals. The term division has been traditionally used instead of phylum when discussing primary producers, although the International Code of Nomenclature for algae, fungi, and plants now accepts the terms as equivalent.

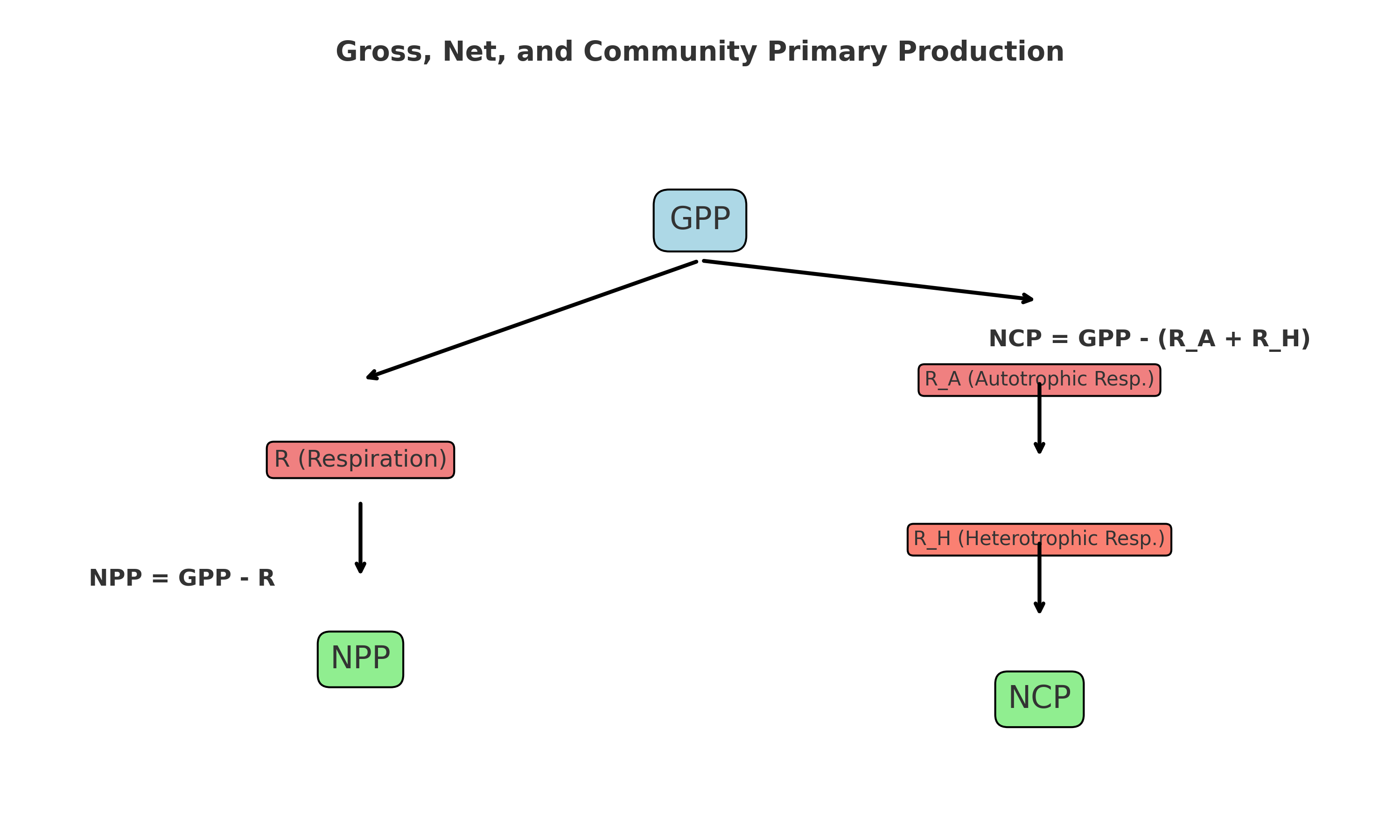
Conceptual diagram illustrating the relationships among gross primary production (GPP), net primary production (NPP), and net community production (NCP) in marine systems.

In a reversal of the pattern on land, in the oceans, almost all photosynthesis is performed by algae and cyanobacteria, with a small fraction contributed by vascular plants and other groups. Algae encompass a diverse range of organisms, ranging from single floating cells to attached seaweeds. They include photoautotrophs from a variety of groups. Eubacteria are important photosynthetisers in both oceanic and terrestrial ecosystems, and while some archaea are phototrophic, none are known to utilise oxygen-evolving photosynthesis. A number of eukaryotes are significant contributors to primary production in the ocean, including green algae, brown algae and red algae, and a diverse group of unicellular groups. Vascular plants are also represented in the ocean by groups such as the seagrasses.

Unlike terrestrial ecosystems, the majority of primary production in the ocean is performed by free-living microscopic organisms called phytoplankton. It has been estimated that half of the world's oxygen is produced by phytoplankton. Larger autotrophs, such as the seagrasses and macroalgae (seaweeds) are generally confined to the littoral zone and adjacent shallow waters, where they can attach to the underlying substrate but still be within the photic zone. There are exceptions, such as Sargassum, but the vast majority of free-floating production takes place within microscopic organisms.

The factors limiting primary production in the ocean are also very different from those on land. The availability of water, obviously, is not an issue (though its salinity can be). Similarly, temperature, while affecting metabolic rates (see Q_{10}), ranges less widely in the ocean than on land because the heat capacity of seawater buffers temperature changes, and the formation of sea ice insulates it at lower temperatures. However, the availability of light, the source of energy for photosynthesis, and mineral nutrients, the building blocks for new growth, play crucial roles in regulating primary production in the ocean. Available Earth System Models suggest that ongoing ocean bio-geochemical changes could trigger reductions in ocean NPP between 3% and 10% of current values depending on the emissions scenario.

In 2020 researchers reported that measurements over the last two decades of primary production in the Arctic Ocean show an increase of nearly 60% due to higher concentrations of phytoplankton. They hypothesize new nutrients are flowing in from other oceans and suggest this means the Arctic Ocean may be able to support higher trophic level production and additional carbon fixation in the future.

== Cyanobacteria ==
Evolution of photosynthesis from cyanobacteria

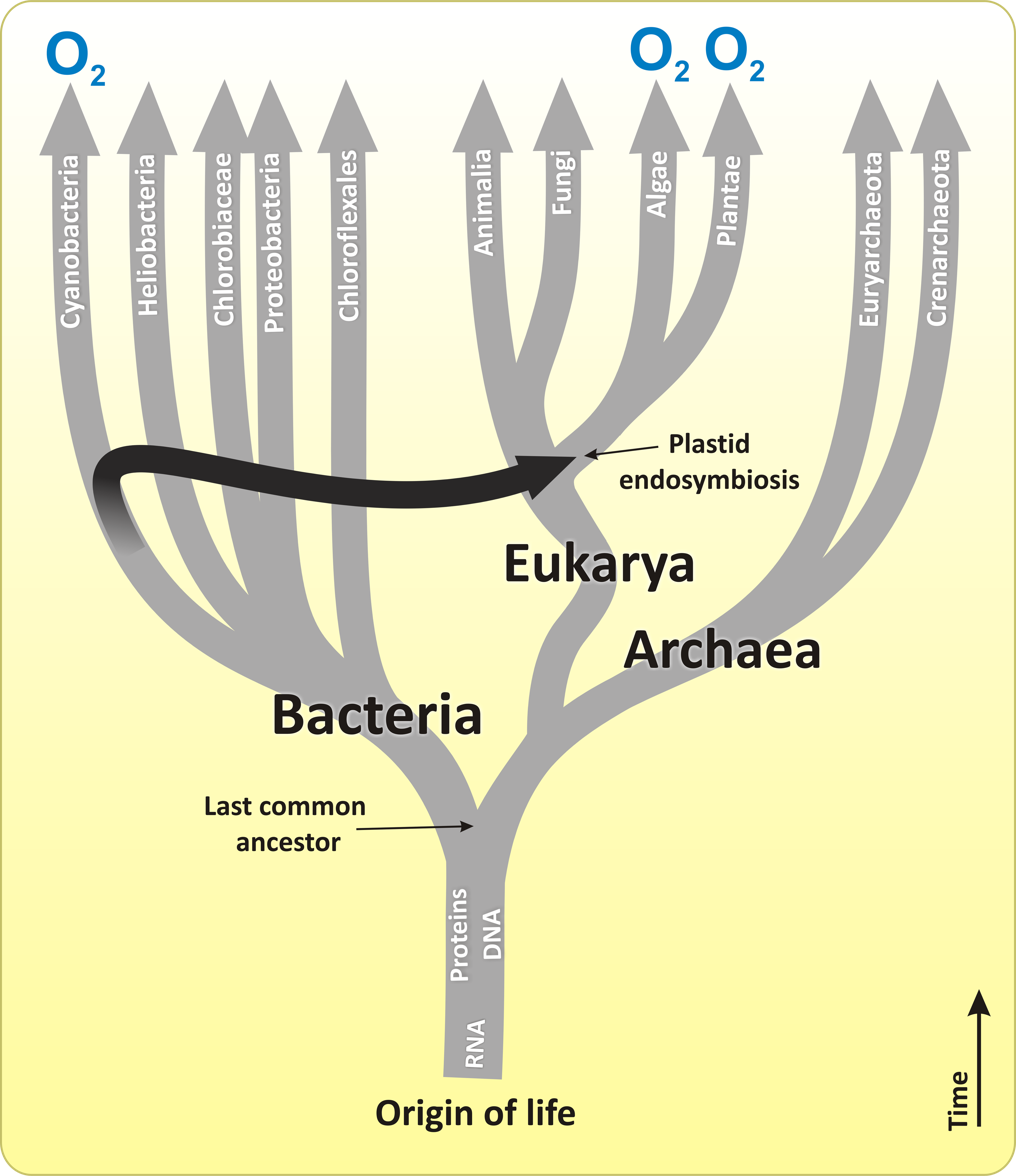
The origin and evolutionary tree of life that is based on small-subunit RNA. The branches that perform oxygenic photosynthesis are labelled with 'O2'. The black arrow indicates the plastid endosymbiotic event that resulted in the origin of eukaryotic photosynthesis from cyanobacteria-like organisms, which ultimately became chloroplasts in algae and later in plants. However, while chloroplasts of the higher plants, glaucophytes, green and red algae are thought to be the result of the plastid (primary) endosymbiosis, all other groups of algae are assumed to have arisen due to the algal (secondary and tertiary) endosymbiosis (not shown), in which one eukaryotic alga was incorporated into another eukaryote. Only some branches of bacteria, eukarya, and archaea are displayed.

Cyanobacteria are a phylum (division) of bacteria, ranging from unicellular to filamentous and including colonial species, which fix inorganic carbon into organic carbon compounds. They are found almost everywhere on earth: in damp soil, in both freshwater and marine environments, and even on Antarctic rocks. In particular, some species occur as drifting cells floating in the ocean, and as such were amongst the first of the phytoplankton. These bacteria function like algae in that they can process nitrogen from the atmosphere when none is in the ocean.

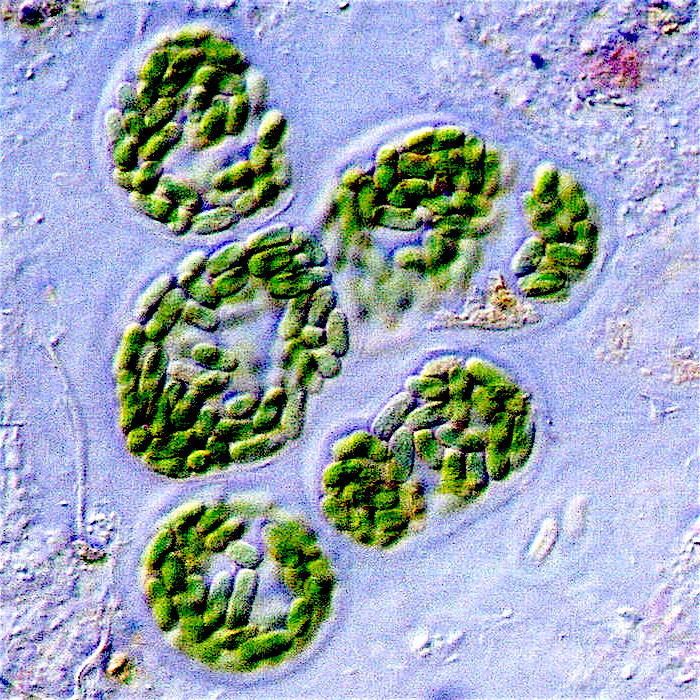
Cyanobacteria from a microbial mat. Cyanobacteria were the first organisms to release oxygen via photosynthesis.

The first primary producers that used photosynthesis were oceanic cyanobacteria about 2.3 billion years ago. The release of molecular oxygen by cyanobacteria as a by-product of photosynthesis induced global changes in the Earth's environment. Because oxygen was toxic to most life on Earth at the time, this led to the near-extinction of oxygen-intolerant organisms, a dramatic change which redirected the evolution of the major animal and plant species.

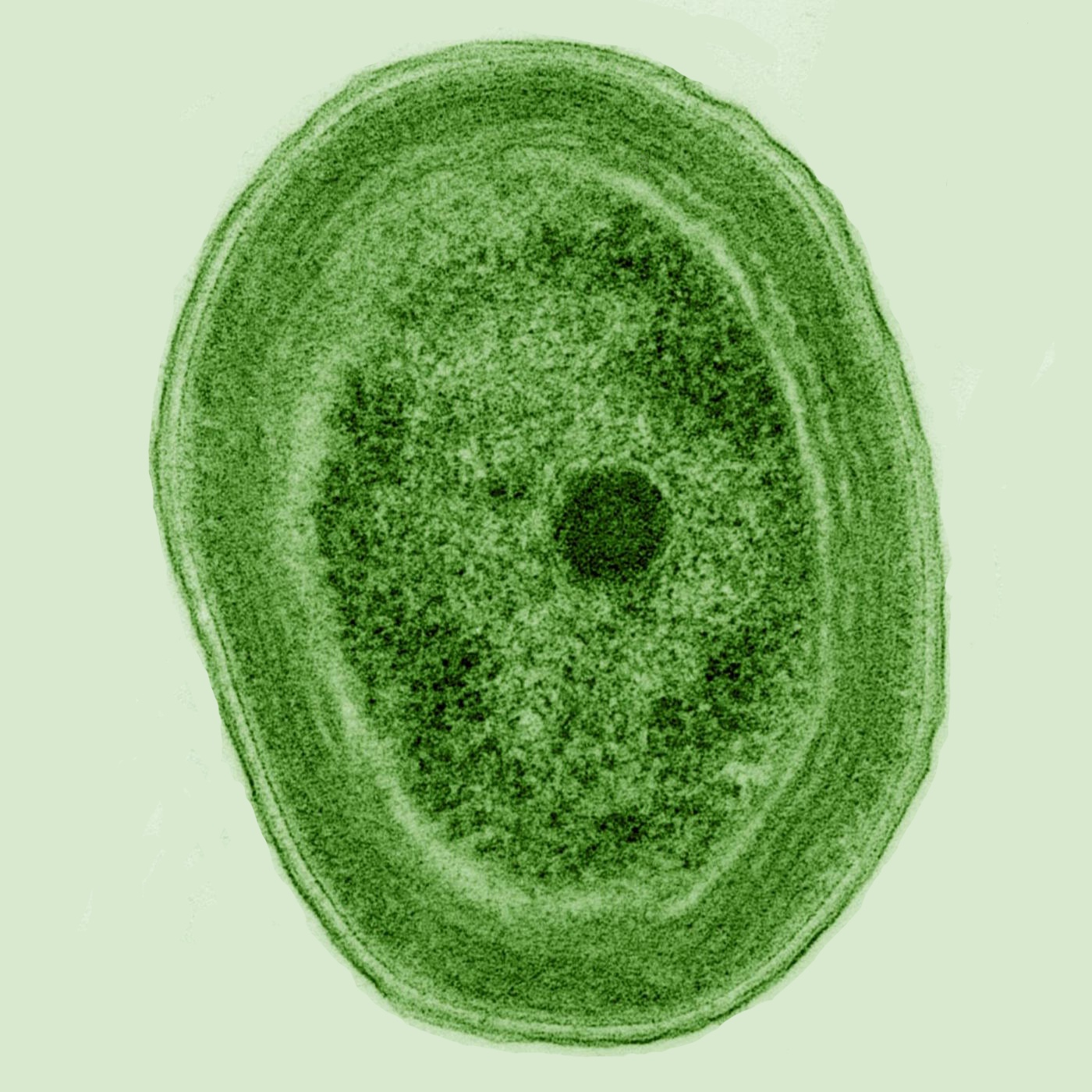
Prochlorococcus marinus

The tiny marine cyanobacterium Prochlorococcus, discovered in 1986, forms part of the base of the ocean food chain. The cyanobacterium accounts for more than half the photosynthesis of the open ocean and an estimated 20% of the oxygen in the Earth's atmosphere. It is possibly the most plentiful genus on Earth: a single millilitre of surface seawater may contain 100,000 cells or more.

Originally, biologists thought cyanobacteria was algae, and referred to it as "blue-green algae". The more recent view is that cyanobacteria are bacteria, and hence are not even in the same Kingdom as algae. Most authorities exclude all prokaryotes, and hence cyanobacteria from the definition of algae.

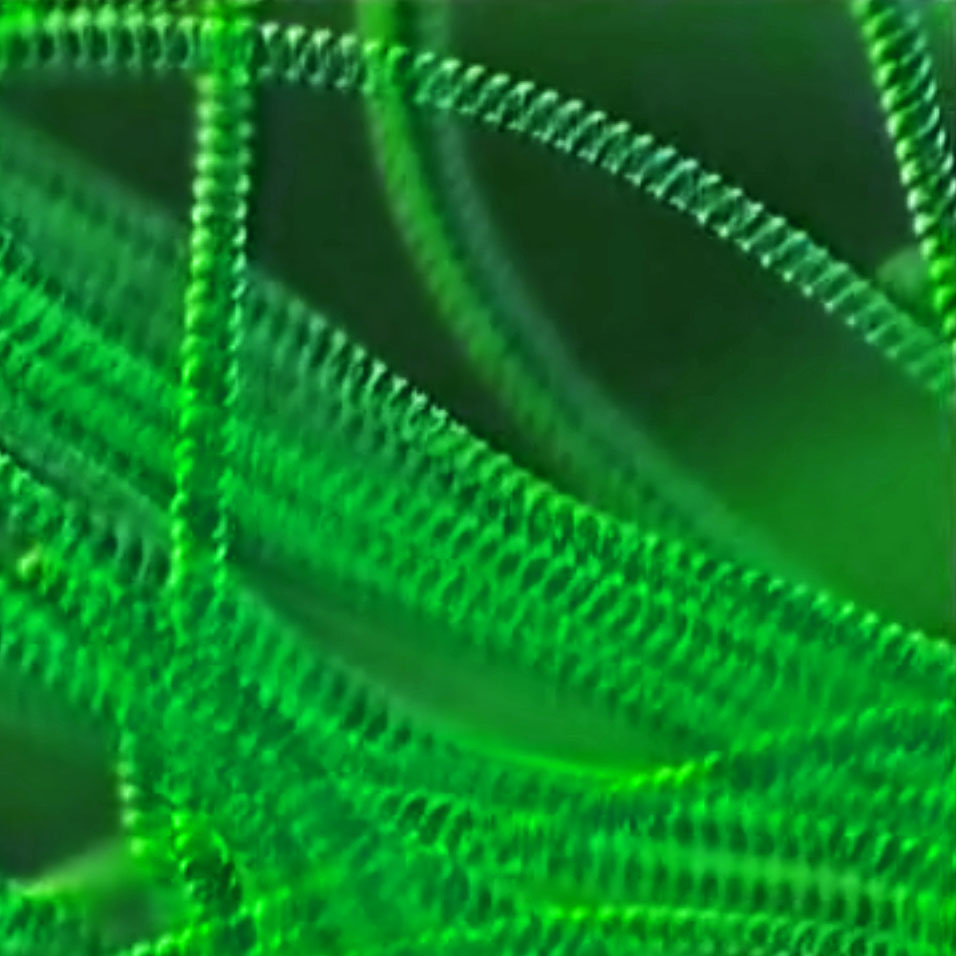
Helical cyanobacteria

== Biological pigments ==
Biological pigments are any coloured material in plant or animal cells. All biological pigments selectively absorb certain wavelengths of light while reflecting others. The primary function of pigments in plants is photosynthesis, which uses the green pigment chlorophyll and several colourful pigments that absorb as much light energy as possible. Chlorophyll is the primary pigment in plants; it is a chlorin that absorbs yellow and blue wavelengths of light while reflecting green. It is the presence and relative abundance of chlorophyll that gives plants their green colour. Green algae and plants possess two forms of this pigment: chlorophyll a and chlorophyll b. Kelps, diatoms, and other photosynthetic heterokonts contain chlorophyll c instead of b, while red algae possess only chlorophyll a. All chlorophylls serve as the primary means plants use to intercept light in order to fuel photosynthesis.

=== Chloroplasts ===
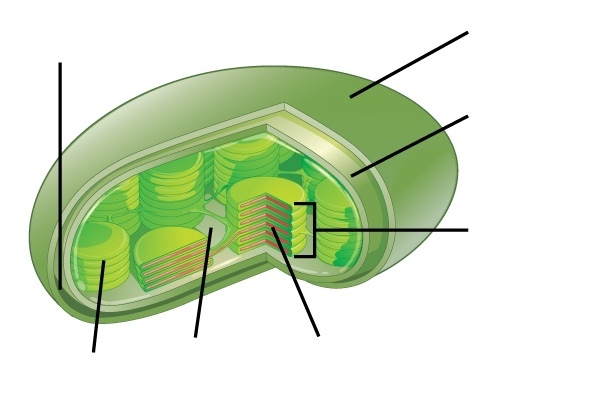
Parts of a chloroplast

Diagram above contains clickable links

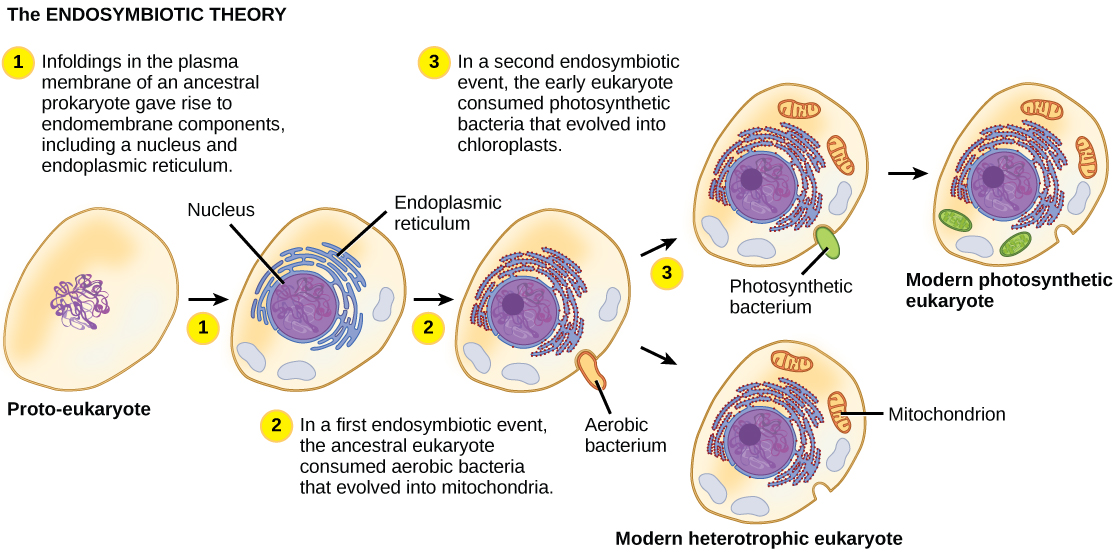
Endosymbiosis The first eukaryote may have originated from an ancestral prokaryote that had undergone membrane proliferation, compartmentalization of cellular function (into a nucleus, lysosomes, and an endoplasmic reticulum), and the establishment of endosymbiotic relationships with an aerobic prokaryote and, in some cases, a photosynthetic prokaryote to form mitochondria and chloroplasts, respectively.

Chloroplasts (from the Greek chloros for green, and plastes for "the one who forms") are organelles that conduct photosynthesis, where the photosynthetic pigment chlorophyll captures the energy from sunlight, converts it, and stores it in the energy-storage molecules while freeing oxygen from water in plant and algal cells. They then use the stored energy to make organic molecules from carbon dioxide in a process known as the Calvin cycle.

A chloroplast is a type of organelle known as a plastid, characterised by its two membranes and a high concentration of chlorophyll. They are highly dynamic—they circulate and are moved around within plant cells, and occasionally pinch in two to reproduce. Their behaviour is strongly influenced by environmental factors like light colour and intensity. Chloroplasts, like mitochondria, contain their own DNA, which is thought to be inherited from their ancestor—a photosynthetic cyanobacterium that was engulfed by an early eukaryotic cell. Chloroplasts cannot be made by the plant cell and must be inherited by each daughter cell during cell division.

Most chloroplasts can probably be traced back to a single endosymbiotic event, when a cyanobacterium was engulfed by the eukaryote. Despite this, chloroplasts can be found in an extremely wide set of organisms, some not even directly related to each other—a consequence of many secondary and even tertiary endosymbiotic events.

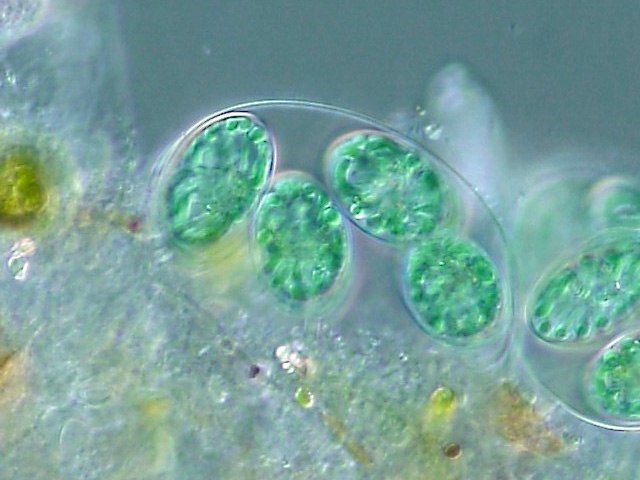
The chloroplasts of glaucophytes have a peptidoglycan layer, evidence suggesting their endosymbiotic origin from cyanobacteria.

=== Microbial rhodopsin ===
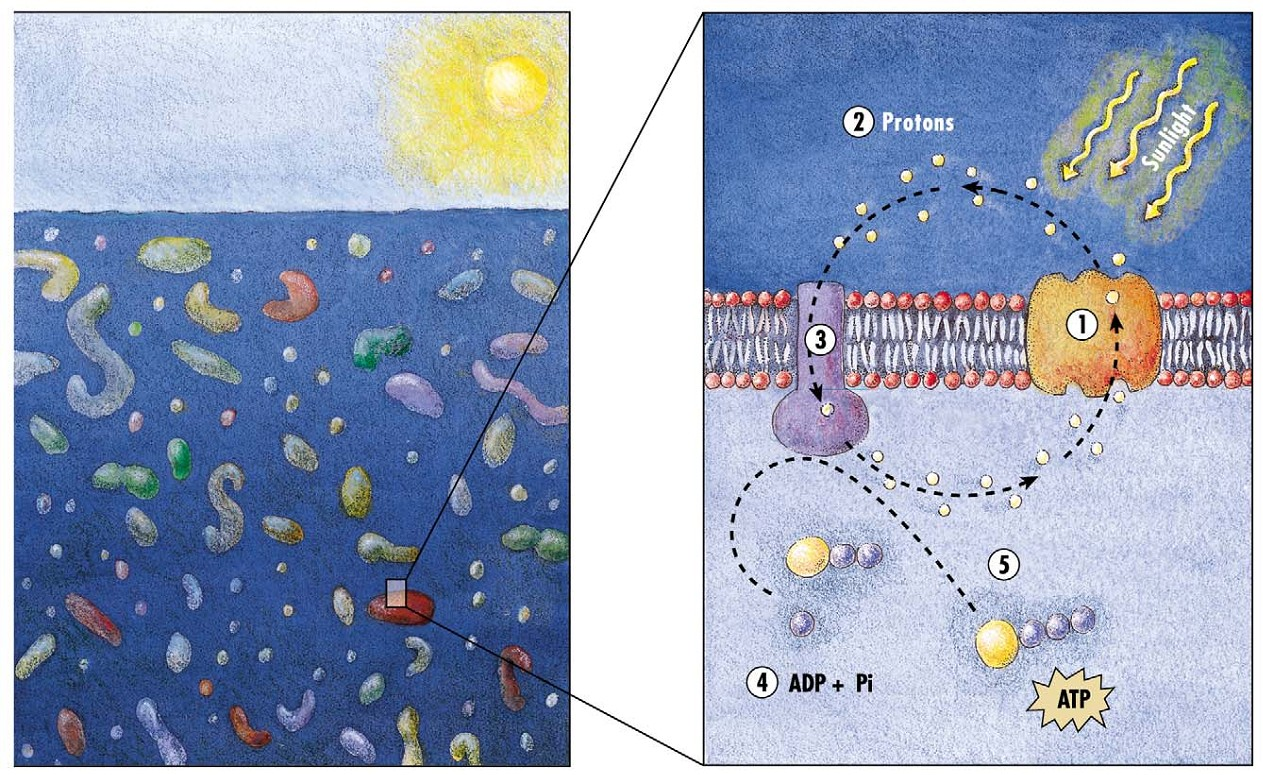
Model of the energy generating mechanism in marine bacteria (1) When sunlight strikes a rhodopsin molecule (2) it changes its configuration so a proton is expelled from the cell (3) the chemical potential causes the proton to flow back to the cell (4) thus generating energy (5) in the form of adenosine triphosphate.

Phototrophic metabolism relies on one of three energy-converting pigments: chlorophyll, bacteriochlorophyll, and retinal. Retinal is the chromophore found in rhodopsins. The significance of chlorophyll in converting light energy has been written about for decades, but phototrophy based on retinal pigments is just beginning to be studied.

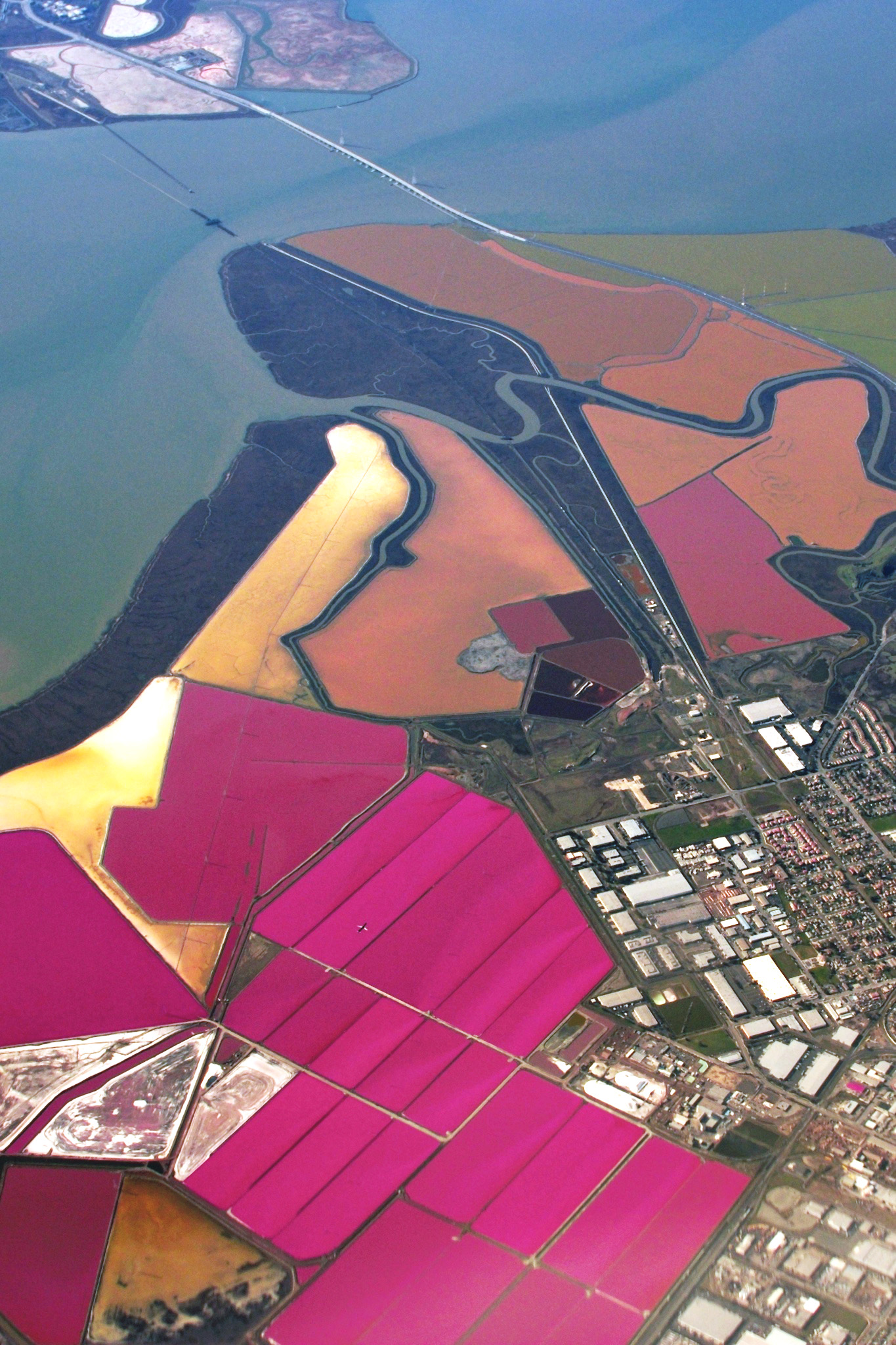
Halobacteria in salt evaporation ponds coloured purple by bacteriorhodopsin

External videos
- Purple sulphur bacteria

In 2000 a team of microbiologists led by Edward DeLong made a crucial discovery in the understanding of the marine carbon and energy cycles. They discovered a gene in several species of bacteria responsible for production of the protein rhodopsin, previously unheard of in bacteria. These proteins found in the cell membranes are capable of converting light energy to biochemical energy due to a change in configuration of the rhodopsin molecule as sunlight strikes it, causing the pumping of a proton from inside out and a subsequent inflow that generates the energy. The archaeal-like rhodopsins have subsequently been found among different taxa, protists as well as in bacteria and archaea, though they are rare in complex multicellular organisms.

Research in 2019 shows these "sun-snatching bacteria" are more widespread than previously thought and could change how oceans are affected by global warming. "The findings break from the traditional interpretation of marine ecology found in textbooks, which states that nearly all sunlight in the ocean is captured by chlorophyll in algae. Instead, rhodopsin-equipped bacteria function like hybrid cars, powered by organic matter when available—as most bacteria are—and by sunlight when nutrients are scarce."

There is an astrobiological conjecture called the Purple Earth hypothesis which surmises that original life forms on Earth were retinal-based rather than chlorophyll-based, which would have made the Earth appear purple instead of green.

== Marine algae ==
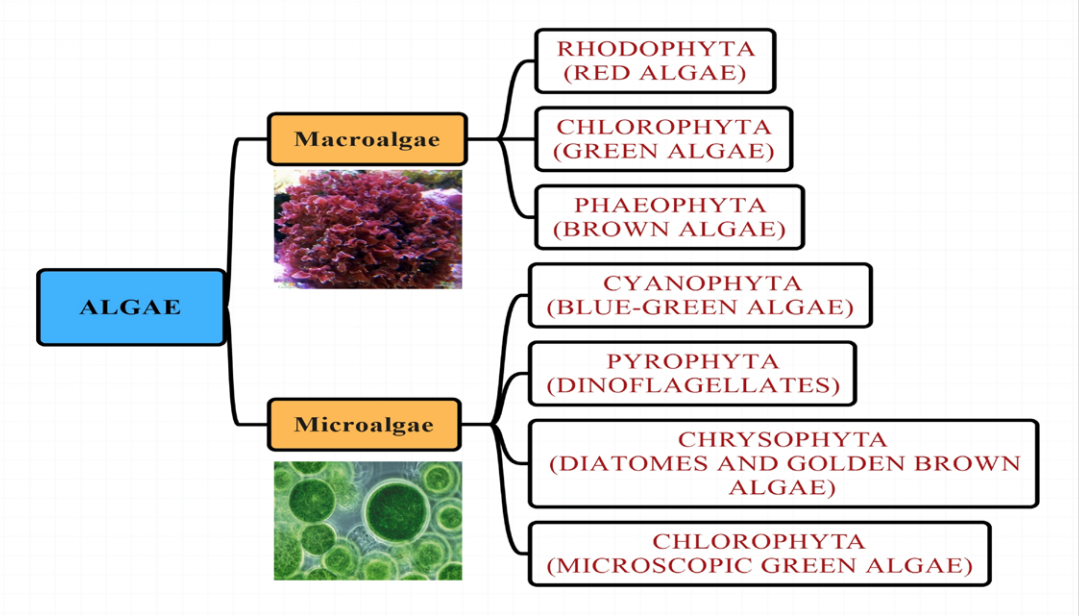
Broad classification of algae

Algae is an informal term for a widespread and diverse collection of photosynthetic eukaryotic organisms which are not necessarily closely related and are thus polyphyletic. Unlike higher plants, algae lack roots, stems, or leaves.

=== Algal groups ===
Marine algae have traditionally been placed in groups such as: green algae, red algae, brown algae, diatoms, coccolithophores and dinoflagellates.

==== Green algae ====
Green algae live most of their lives as single cells or are filamentous, while others form colonies made up from long chains of cells, or are highly differentiated macroscopic seaweeds. They form an informal group containing about 8,000 recognized species.

==== Red algae ====
Modern red algae are mostly multicellular with differentiated cells and include many notable seaweeds. As coralline algae, they play an important role in the ecology of coral reefs. They form a (disputed) phylum containing about 7,000 recognised species.

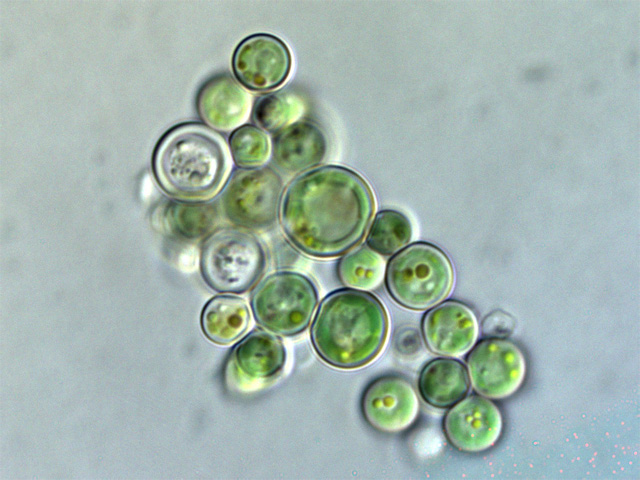
Cyanidiophyceae colony, a class of unicellular red algae

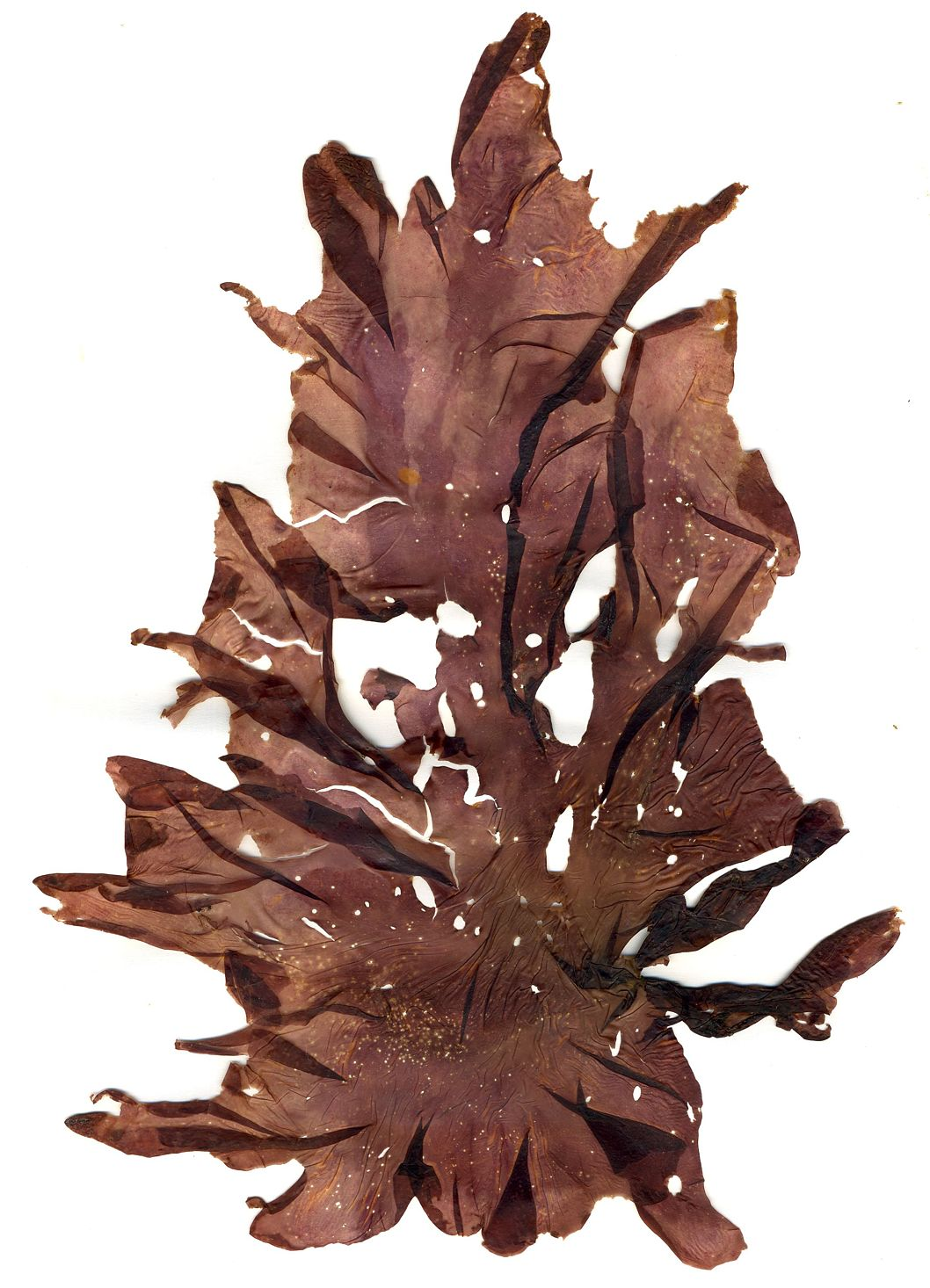
The seaweed Porphyra umbilicalis

==== Brown algae ====
Brown algae are mostly multicellular and include many seaweeds, including kelp. They form a class containing about 2,000 recognised species.

==== Diatoms ====
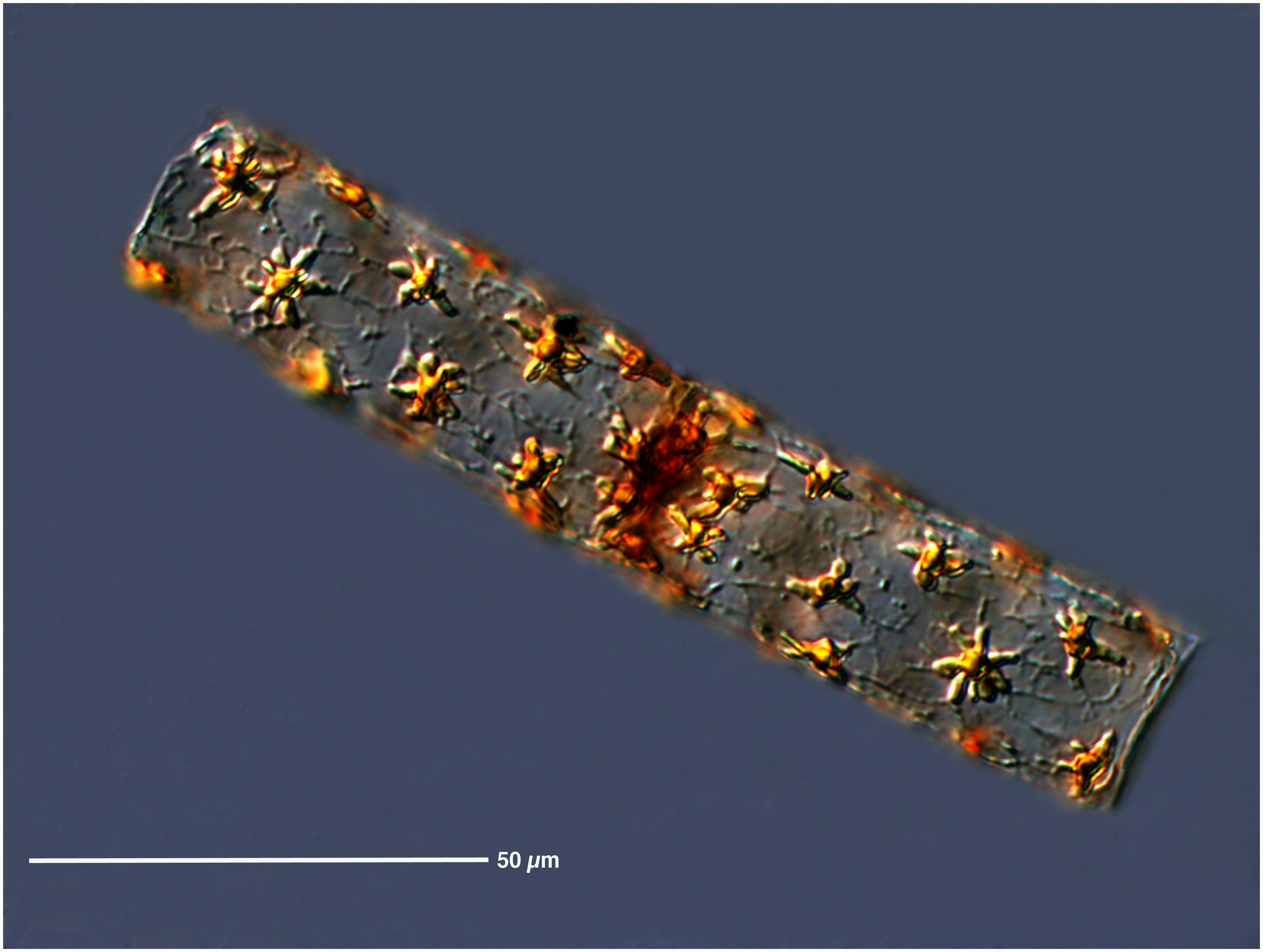
Star stick diatom

Altogether, about 45 percent of the primary production in the oceans is contributed by diatoms.

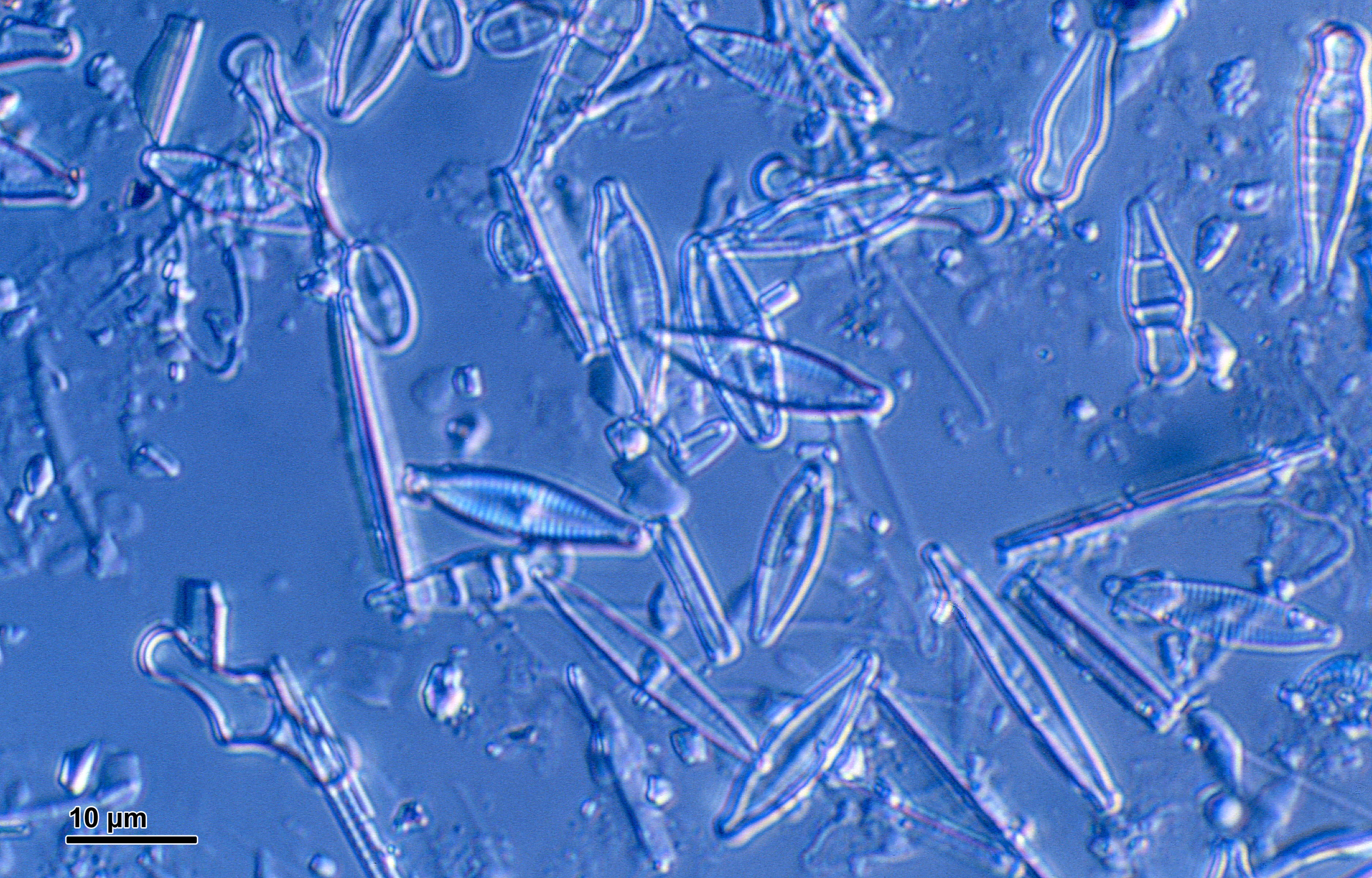
Diatoms are one of the most common types of phytoplankton

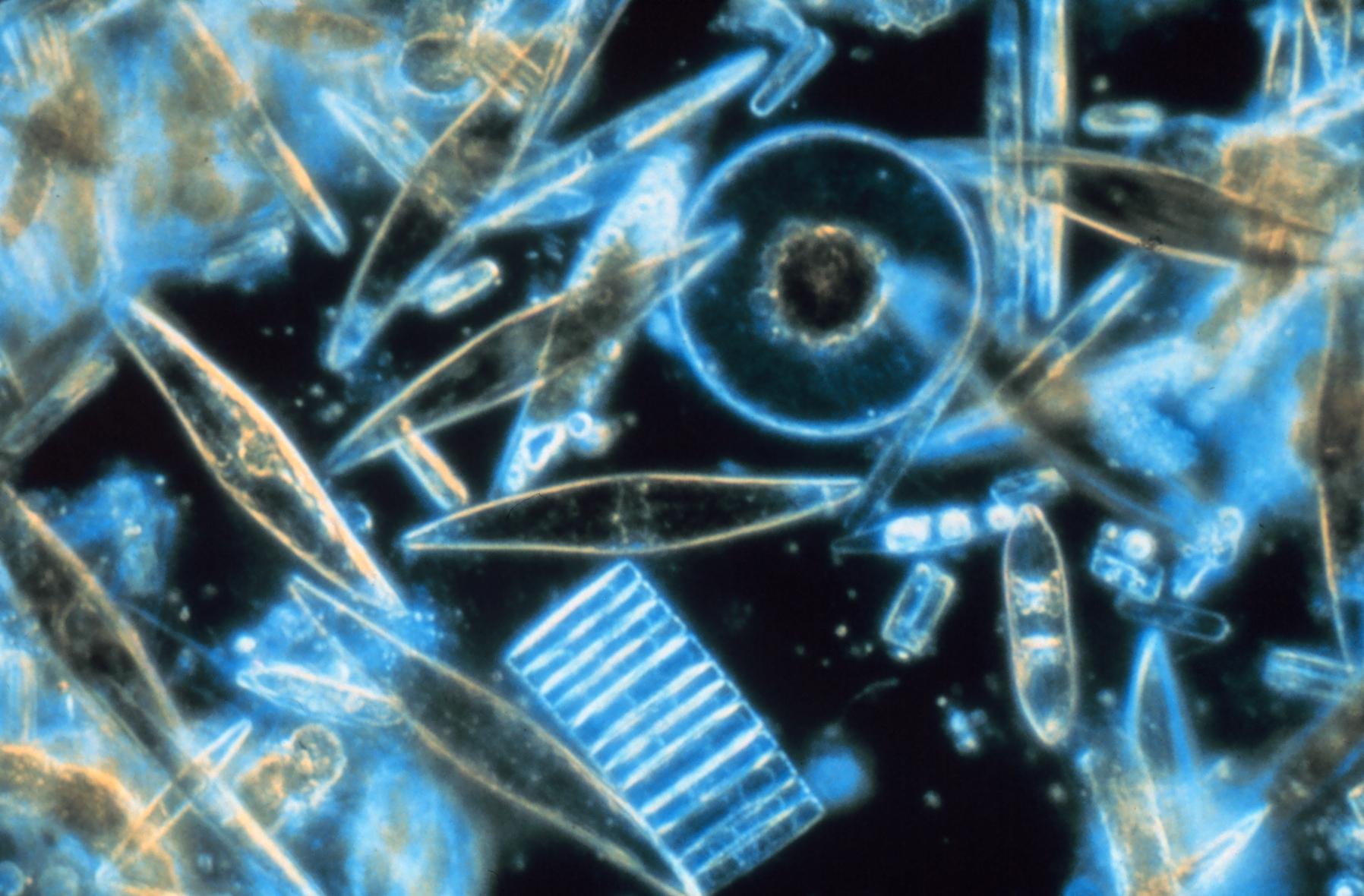
They are a major algae group generating about 20% of world oxygen production.

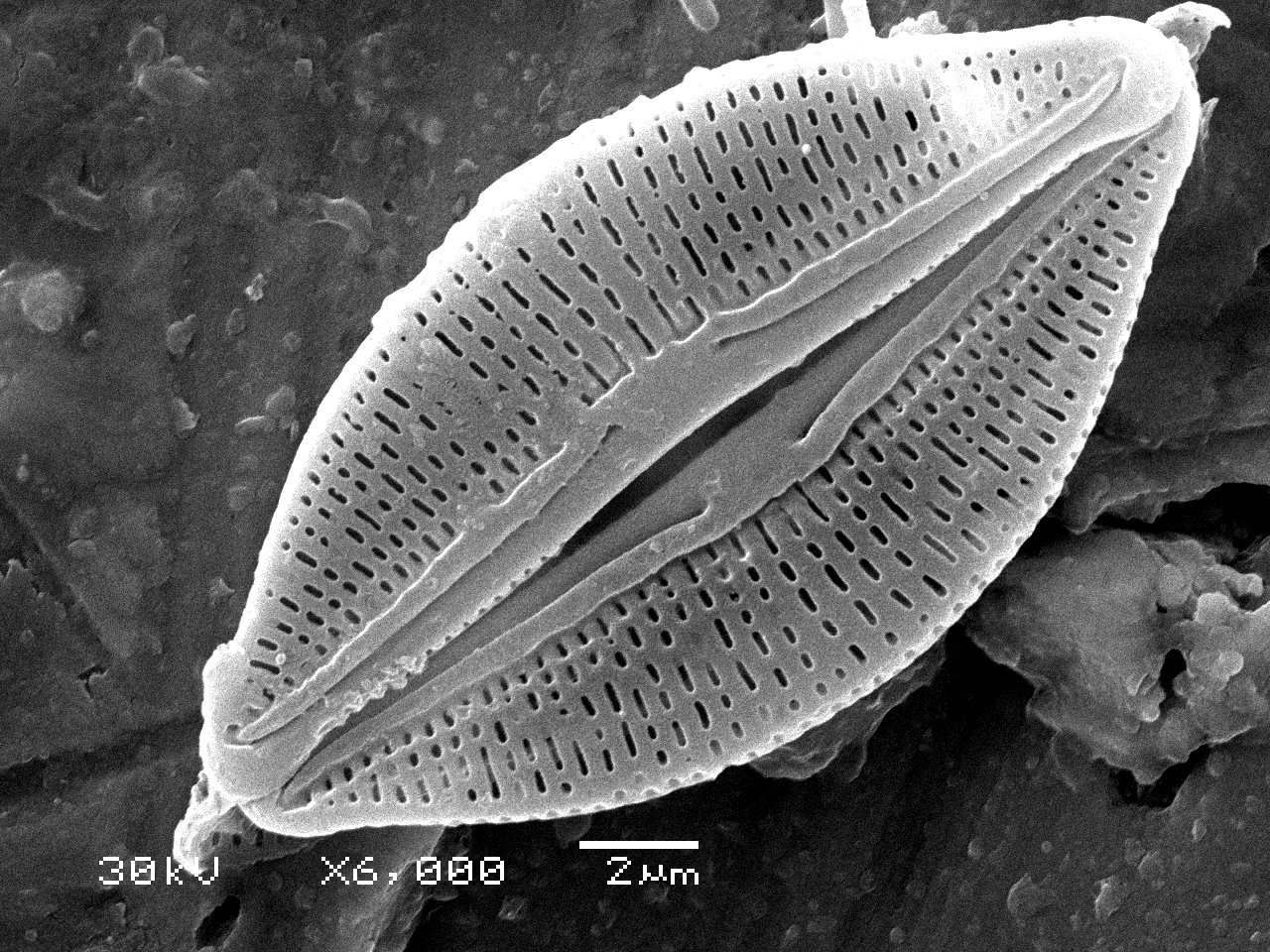
Diatoms have glass like cell walls called frustules which are made of silica.

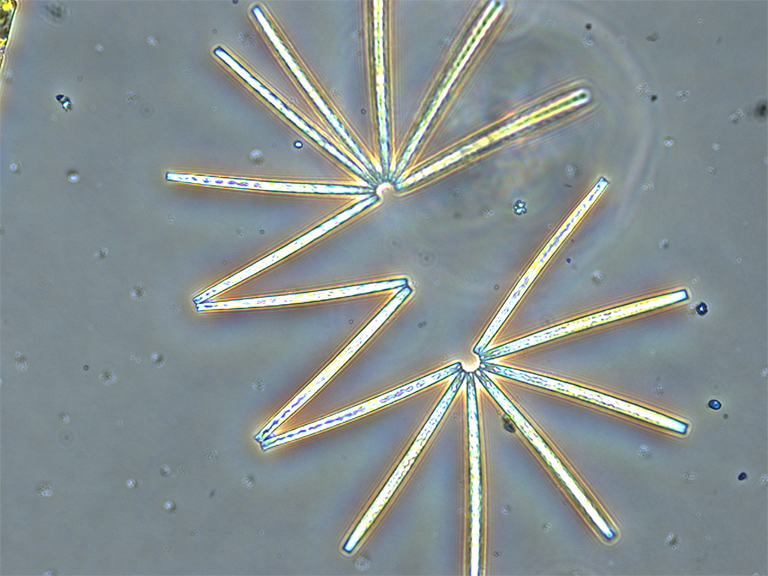
Diatoms linked in a colonial chain

==== Coccolithophores ====
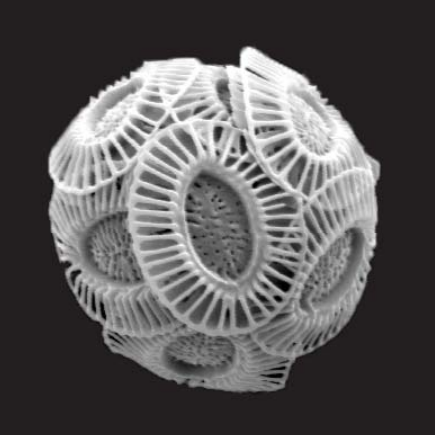
The ubiquitous Emiliania huxleyi

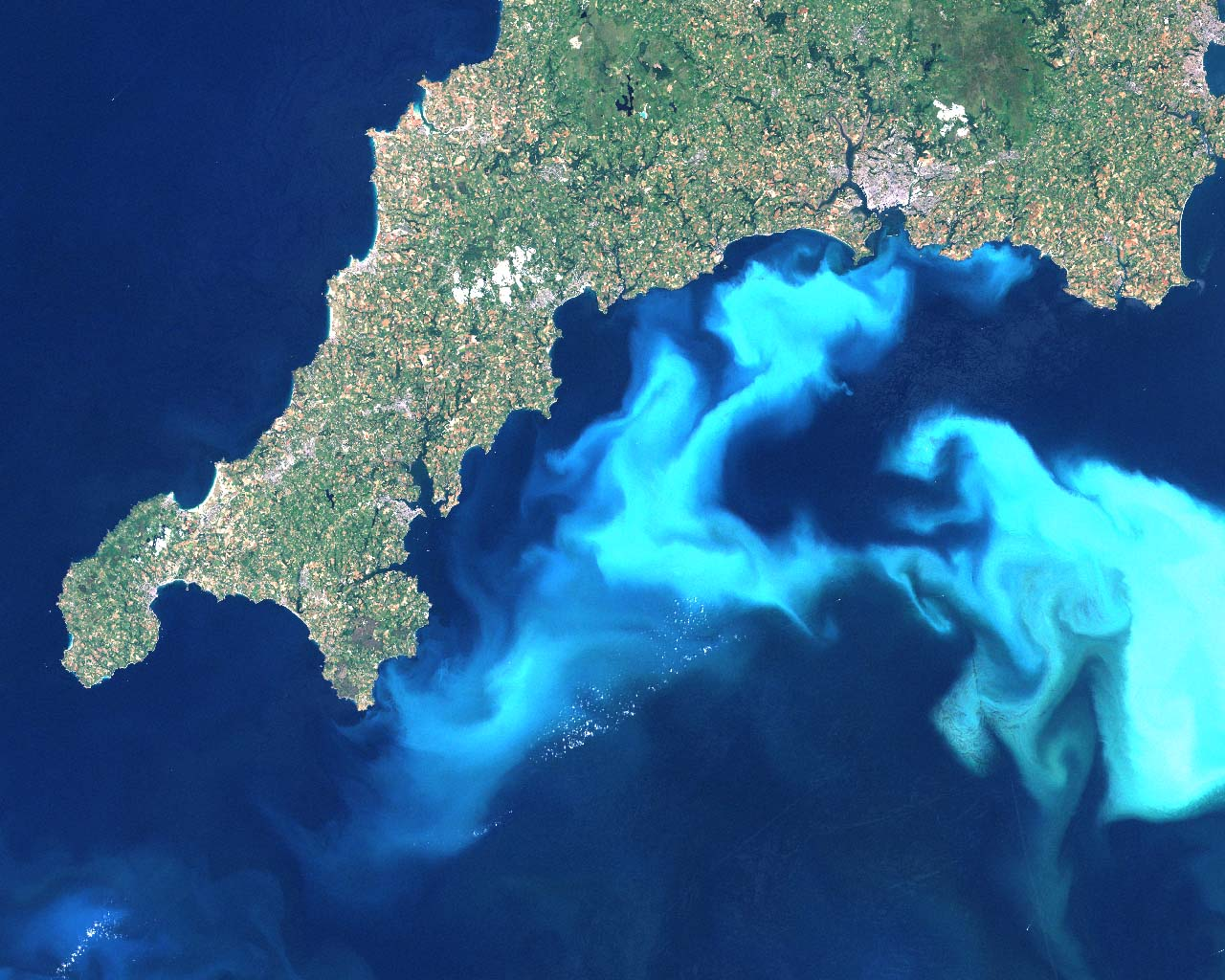
Emiliania huxleyi bloom off south England

Coccolithophores are almost exclusively marine and are found in large numbers throughout the sunlight zone of the ocean. They have calcium carbonate plates (or scales) of uncertain function called coccoliths, which are important microfossils. Coccolithophores are of interest to those studying global climate change because as ocean acidity increases, their coccoliths may become even more important as a carbon sink. The most abundant species of coccolithophore, Emiliania huxleyi is an ubiquitous component of the plankton base in marine food webs. Management strategies are being employed to prevent eutrophication-related coccolithophore blooms, as these blooms lead to a decrease in nutrient flow to lower levels of the ocean.

==== Dinoflagellate ====
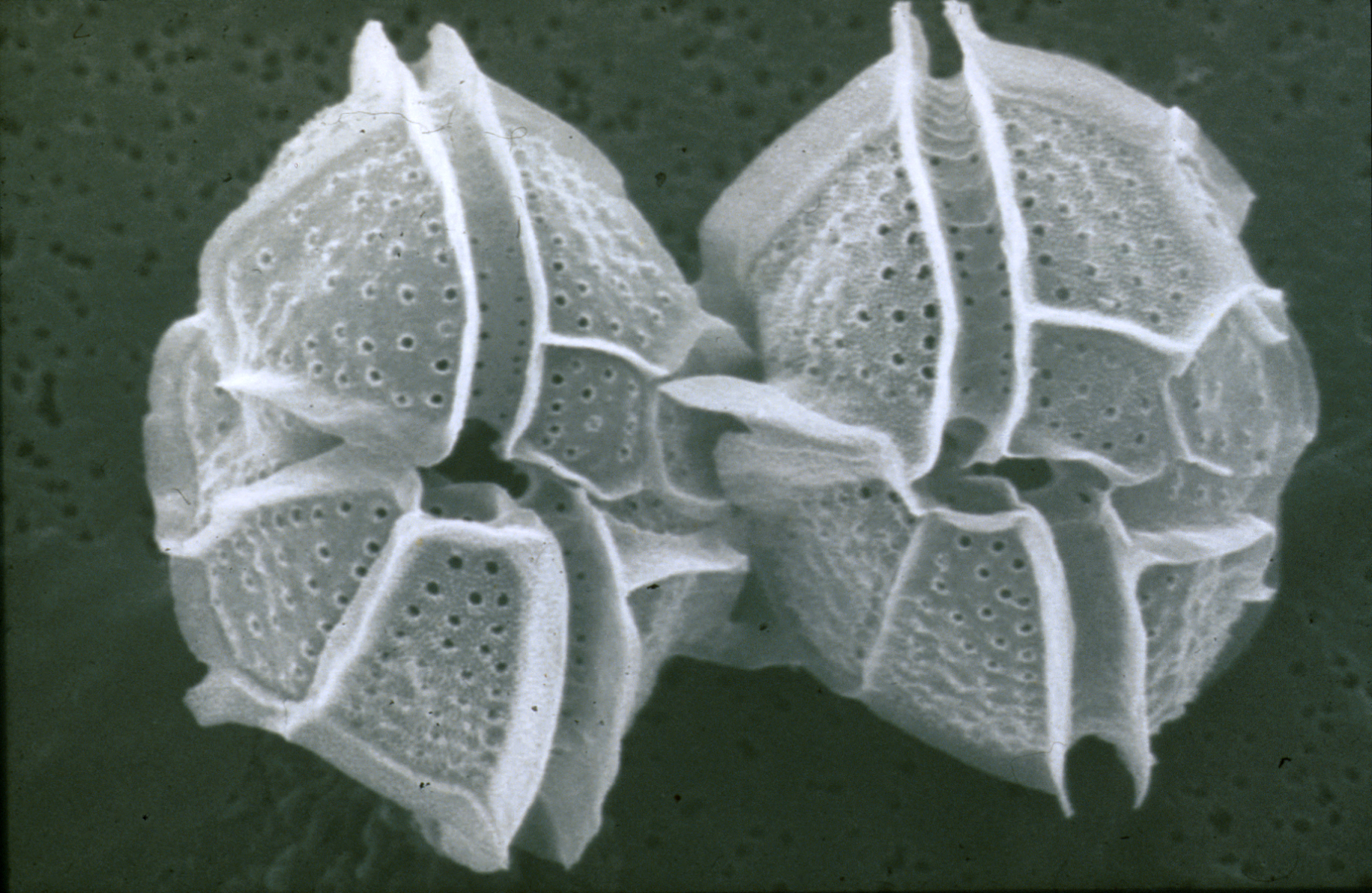
Dinoflagellates

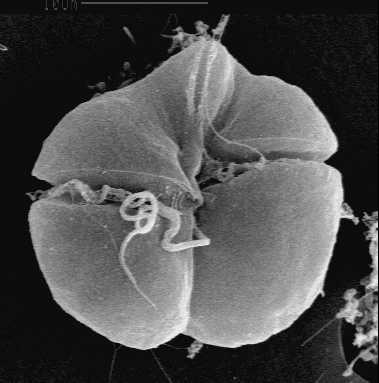
Karenia brevis produces red tides highly toxic to humans.

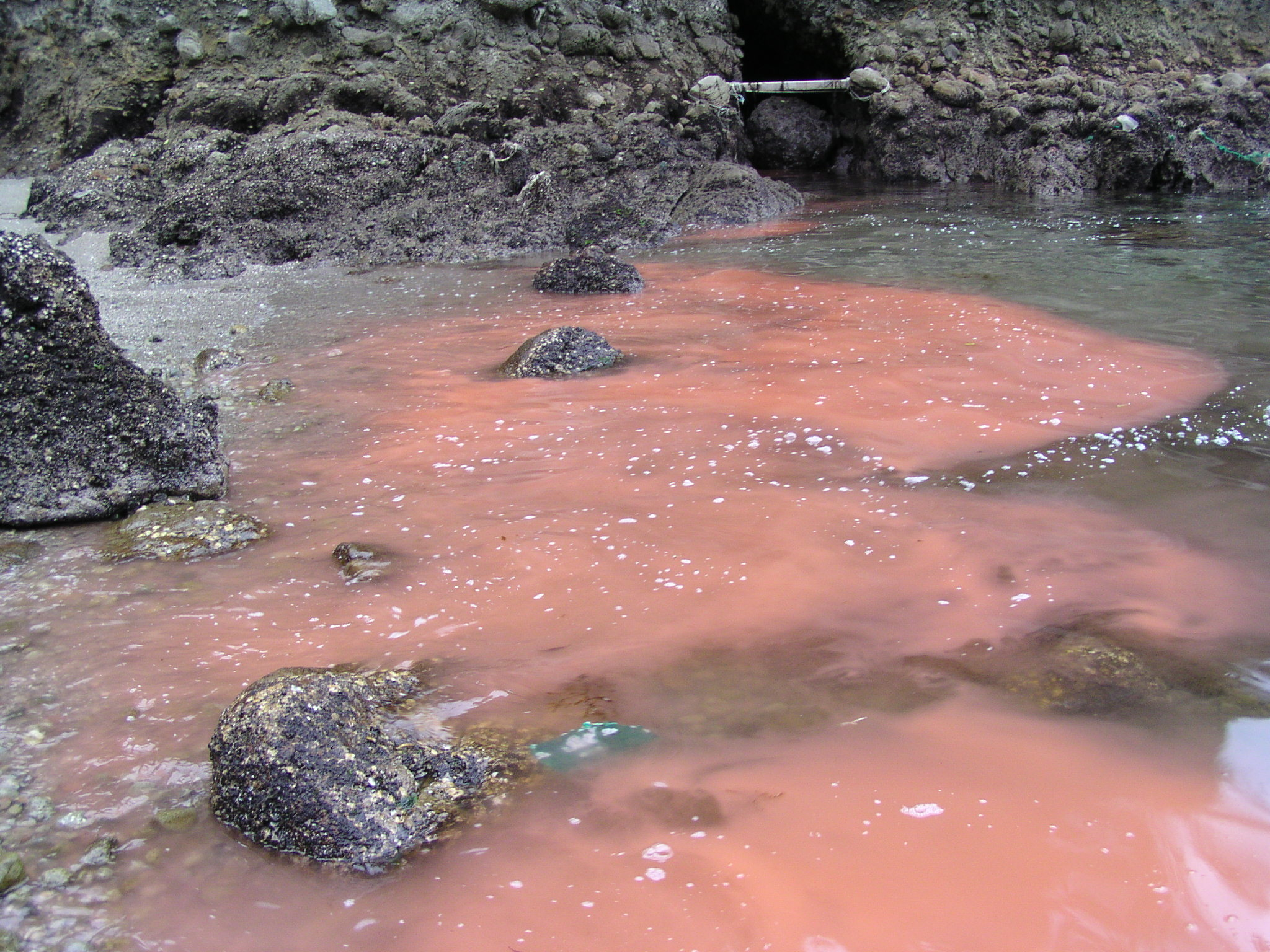
Red tide

==== Other groups ====
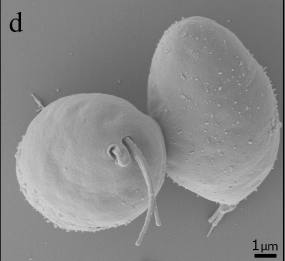
Diplonemids may be abundant in the world oceans.

Traditionally the phylogeny of microorganisms, such as the algal groups discussed above, was inferred and their taxonomy established based on studies of morphology. However developments in molecular phylogenetics have allowed the evolutionary relationship of species to be established by analysing their DNA and protein sequences. Many taxa, including the algal groups discussed above, are in the process of being reclassified or redefined using molecular phylogenetics. Recent developments in molecular sequencing have allowed for the recovery of genomes directly from environmental samples and avoiding the need for culturing. This has led for example, to a rapid expansion in knowledge of the abundance and diversity of marine microorganisms. Molecular techniques such as genome-resolved metagenomics and single cell genomics are being used in combination with high throughput techniques.

Between 2009 and 2013, the Tara Oceans expedition traversed the world oceans collecting plankton and analysing them with contemporary molecular techniques. They found a huge range of previously unknown photosynthetic and mixotrophic algae. Among their findings were the diplonemids. These organisms are generally colourless and oblong in shape, typically about 20 μm long and with two flagella. Evidence from DNA barcoding suggests diplonemids may be among the most abundant and most species-rich of all marine eukaryote groups.

=== By size ===
Algae can be classified by size as microalgae or macroalgae.

==== Microalgae ====
Microalgae are the microscopic types of algae, not visible to the naked eye. They are mostly unicellular species which exist as individuals or in chains or groups, though some are multicellular. Microalgae are important components of the marine protists, as well as the marine phytoplankton. They are very diverse. It has been estimated there are 200,000–800,000 species of which about 50,000 species have been described. Depending on the species, their sizes range from a few micrometers (μm) to a few hundred micrometers. They are specially adapted to an environment dominated by viscous forces.

Microalgae

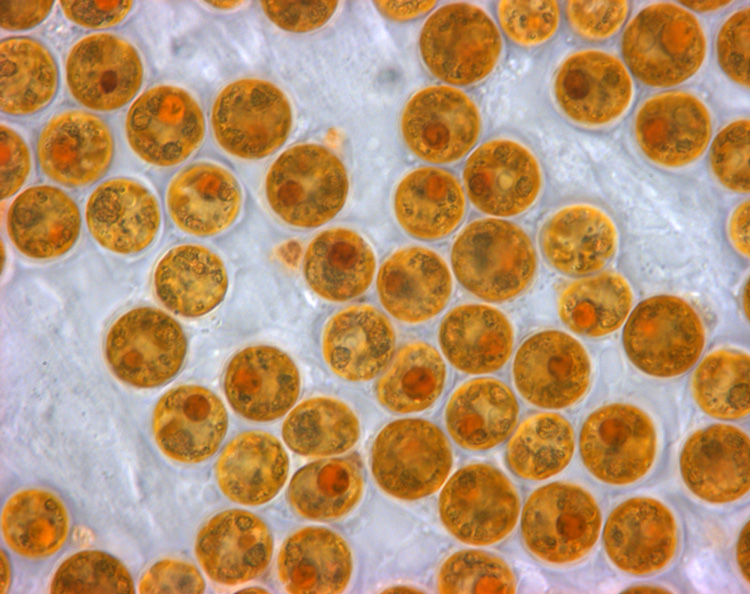
Zooxanthellae is a photosynthetic algae that lives inside hosts like coral.

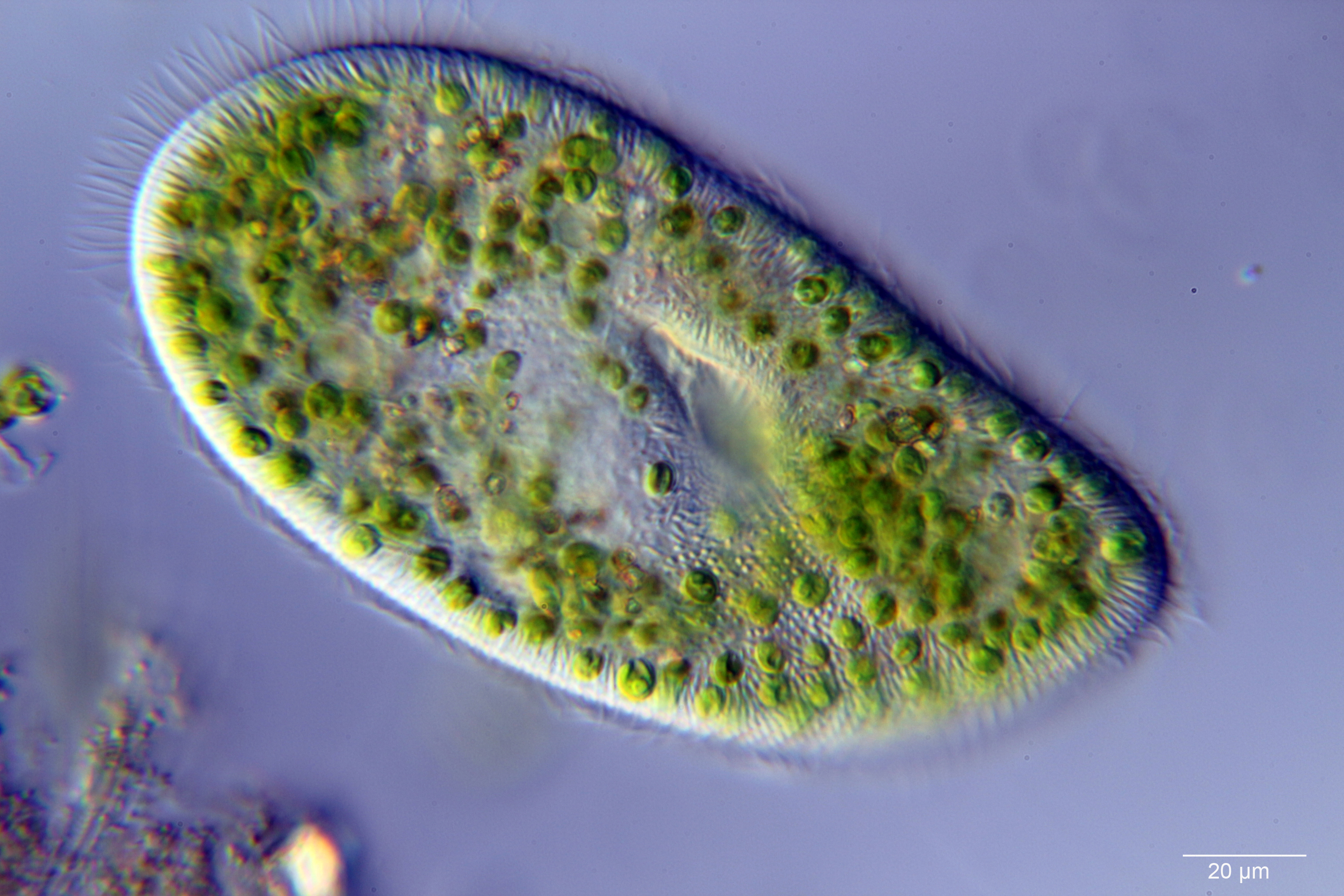
A single-celled ciliate with green zoochlorellae living inside endosymbiotically

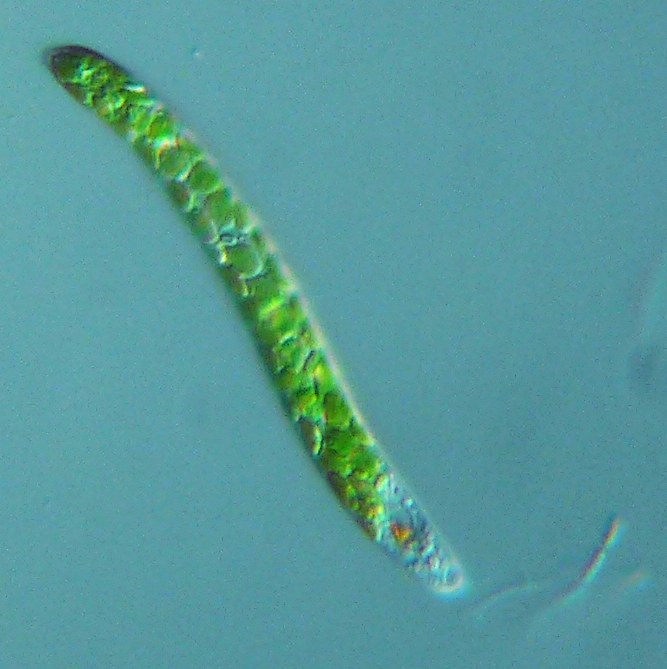
Euglena mutabilis, a photosynthetic flagellate

==== Macroalgae ====
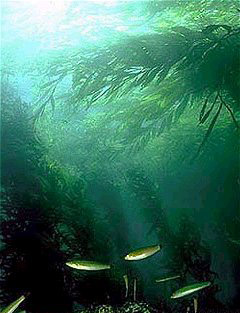
Kelp forests are among the most productive ecosystems on Earth.

Macroalgae are the larger, multicellular and more visible types of algae, commonly called seaweeds. Seaweeds usually grow in shallow coastal waters where they are anchored to the seafloor by a holdfast. Seaweed that becomes adrift can wash up on beaches. Kelp is a large brown seaweed that forms large underwater forests covering about 25% of the world coastlines. They are among the most productive and dynamic ecosystems on Earth. Some Sargassum seaweeds are planktonic (free-floating) and form floating drifts. Like microalgae, macroalgae (seaweeds) are technically marine protists since they are not true plants.

A seaweed is a macroscopic form of red or brown or green algae.

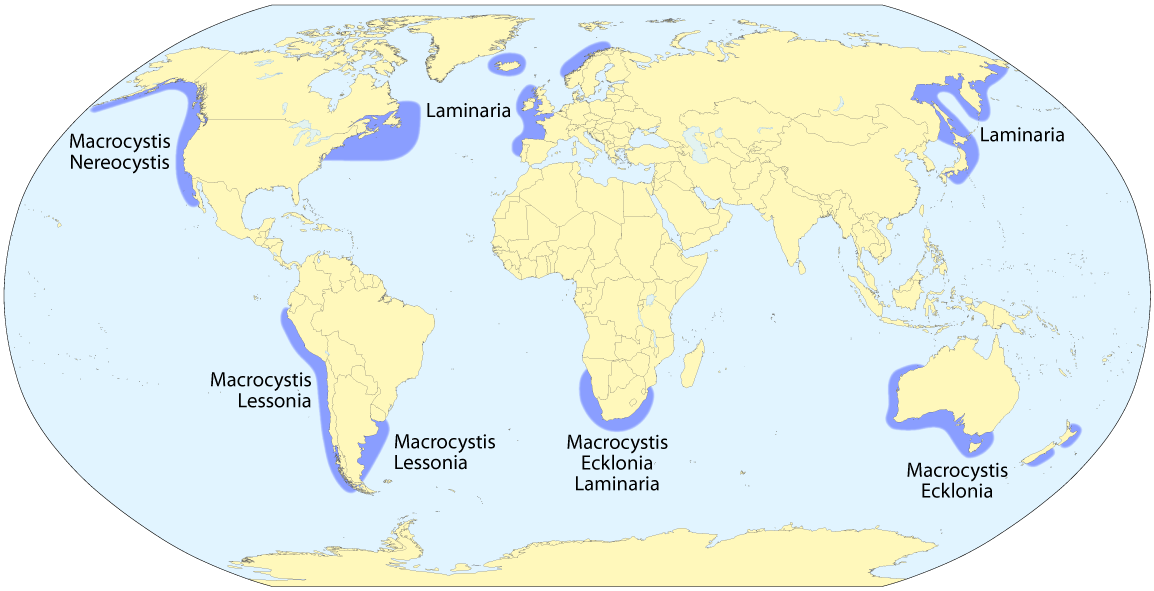
Global distribution of kelp forests

Macroalgae

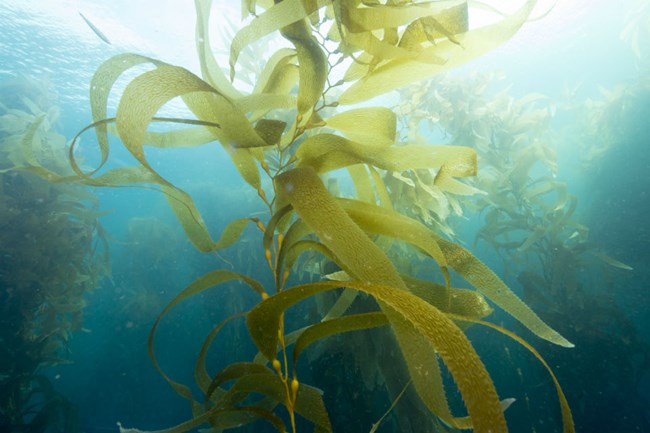
Giant kelp is technically a protist since it is not a true plant, yet it is multicellular and can grow to 50 m (160 ft).

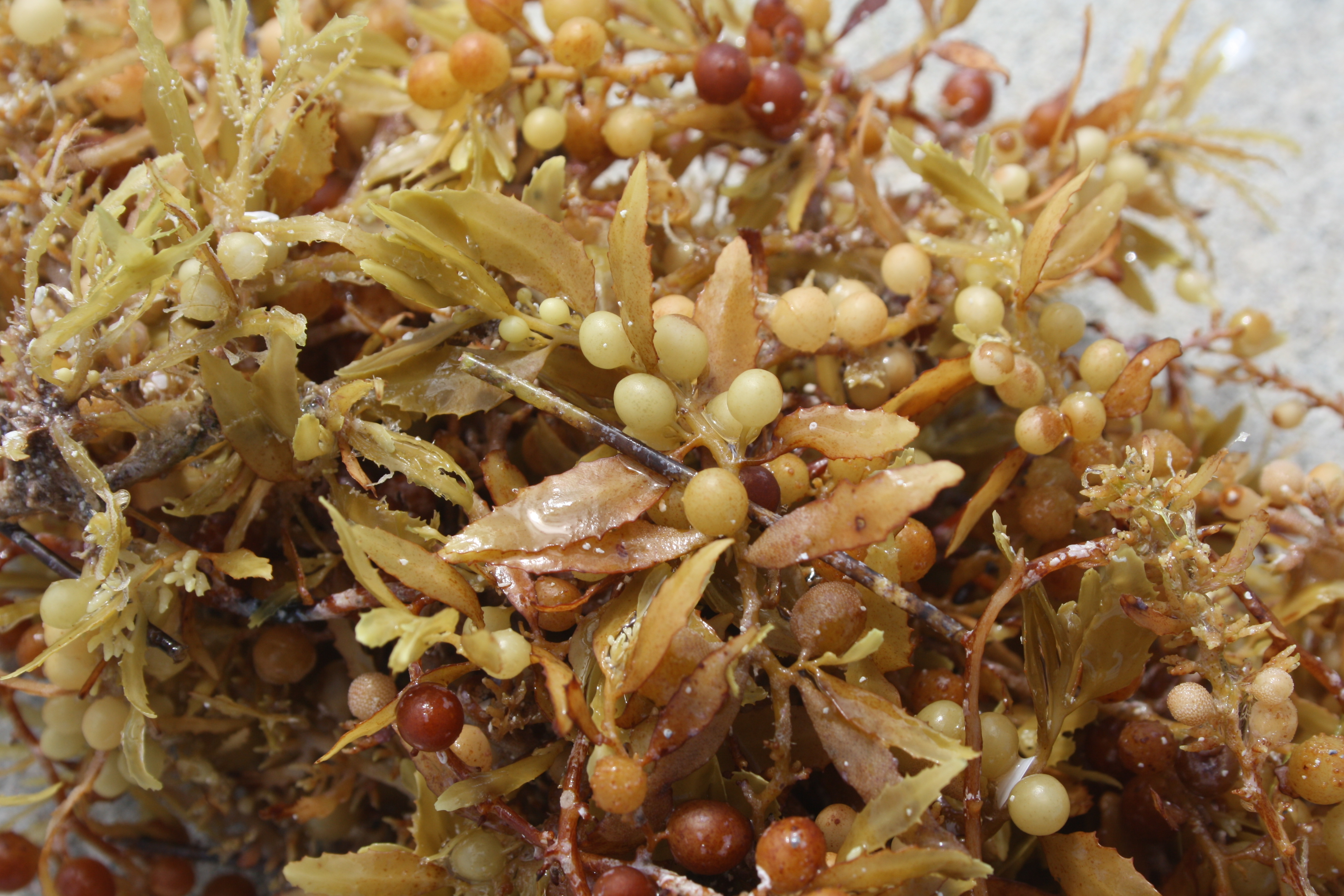
Sargassum seaweed is a brown alga with air bladders that help it float.

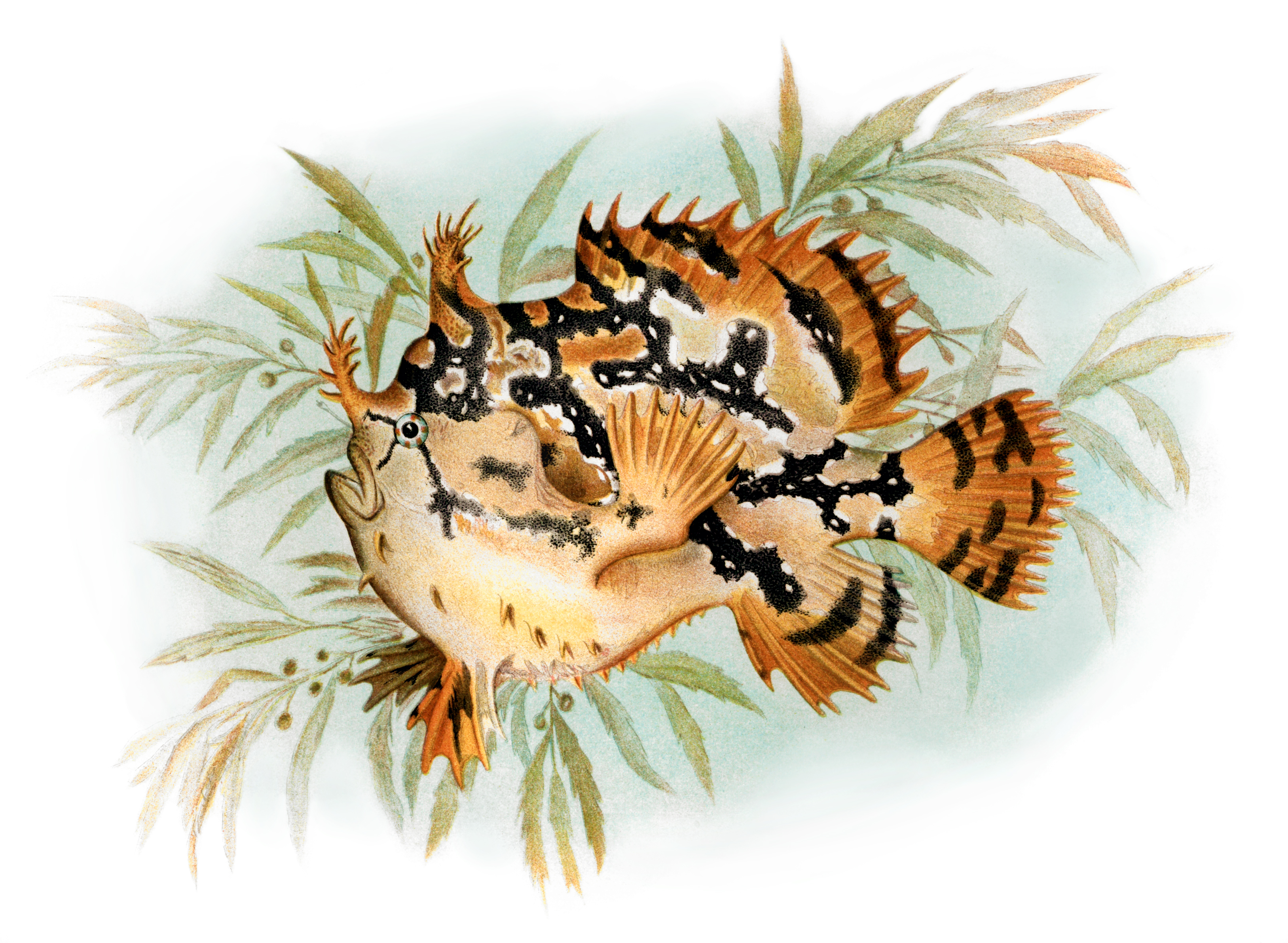
Sargassum fish are camouflaged to live among drifting Sargassum seaweed.

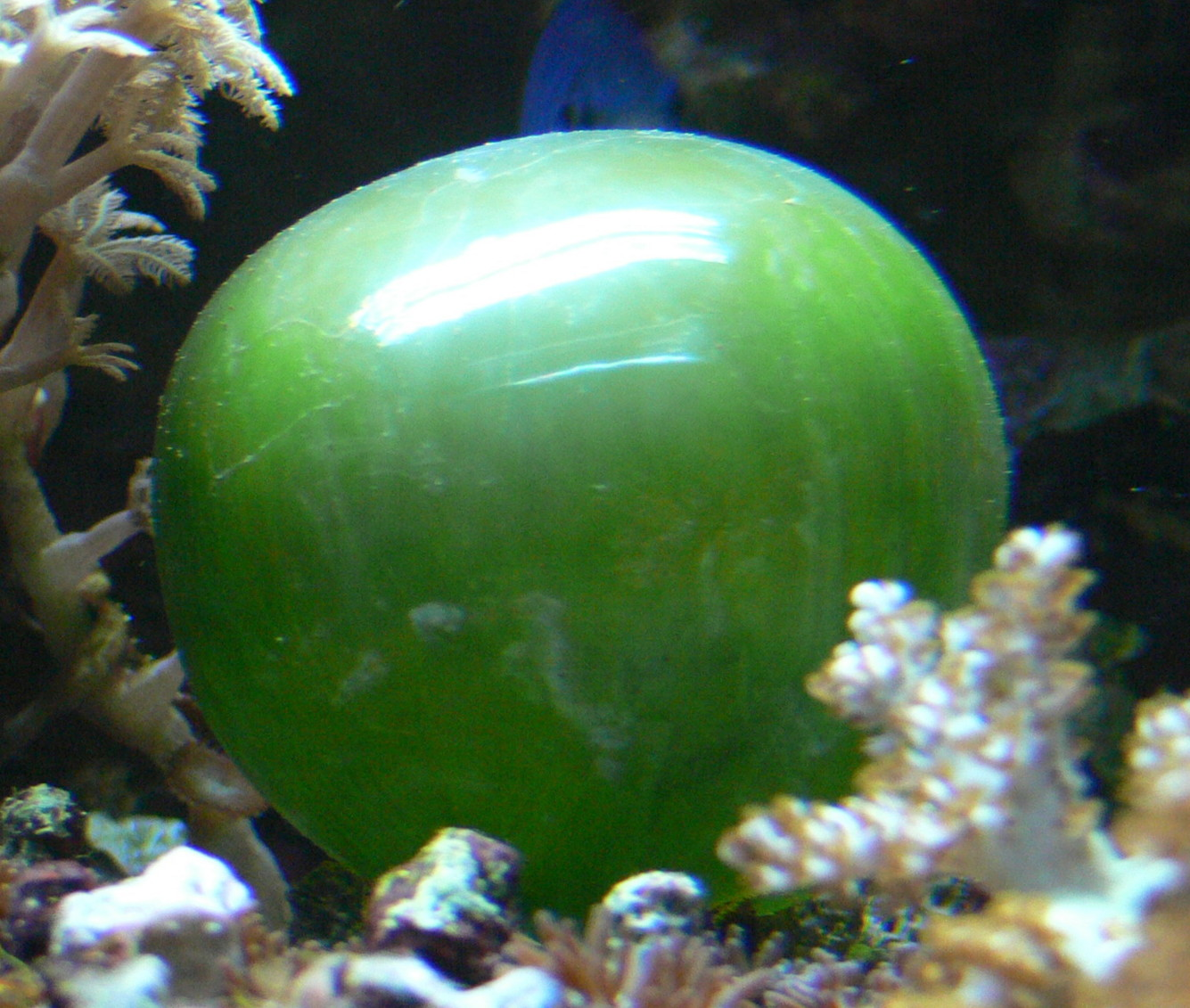
This unicellular bubble algae lives in tidal zones. It can have a 4 cm (1.6 in) diameter.

== Evolution of land plants ==
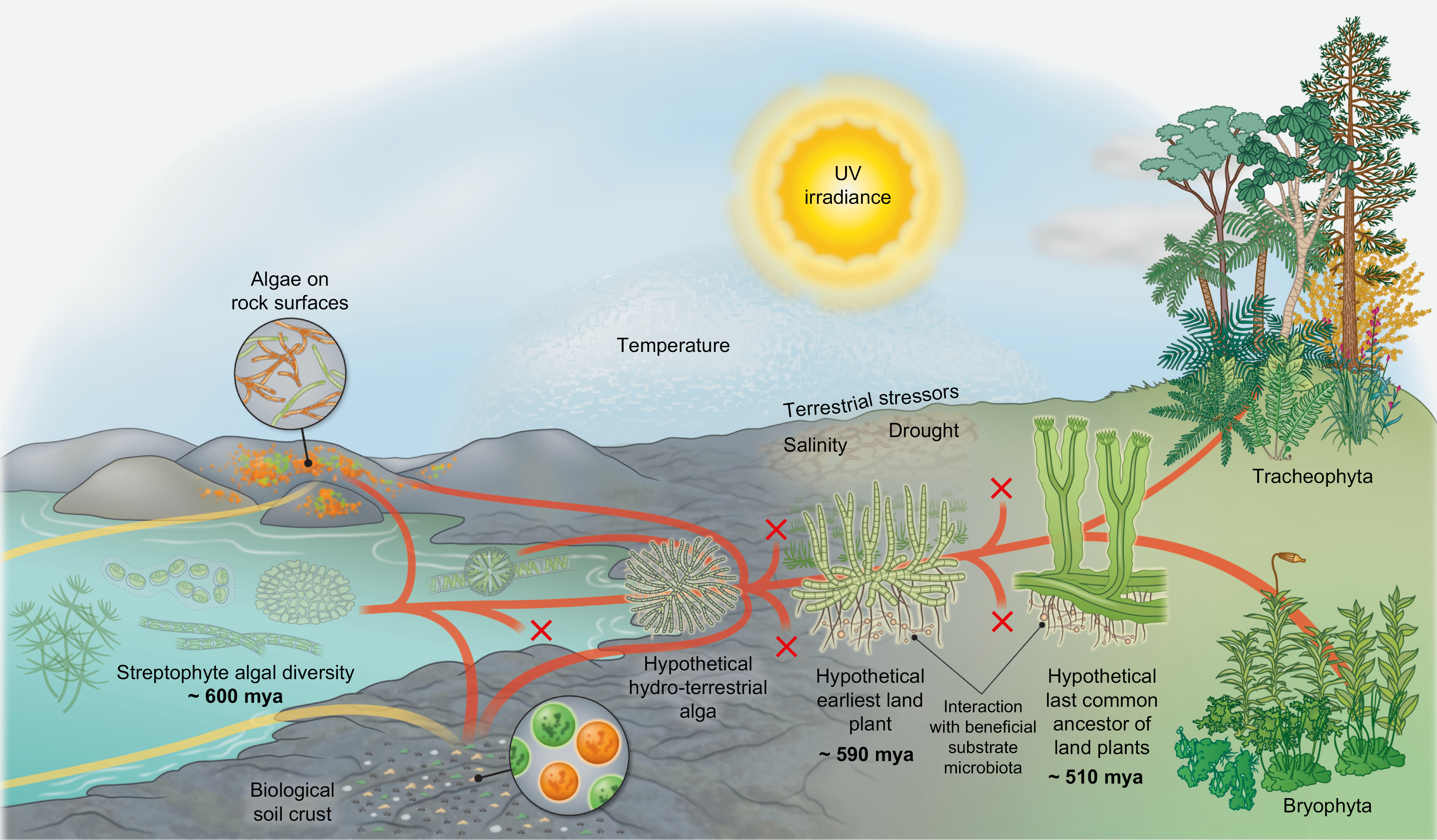
The earliest land plants An evolutionary scenario for the conquest of land by streptophytes Dating is roughly based on Morris et al. 2018.

The diagram on the right shows an evolutionary scenario for the conquest of land by streptophytes. Streptophyte algae include all green algae, and are the only photosynthetic eukaryotes from which the macroscopic land flora evolved (red lines). That said, throughout the course of evolution, algae from various other lineages have colonized land (yellow lines)—but also streptophyte algae have continuously and independently made the wet to dry transition (convergence of red and yellow). Throughout history, numerous lineages have become extinct (X labels). Terrestrial algae of various taxonomic affiliations dwell on rock surfaces and form biological soil crusts. From the diversity of the paraphyletic streptophyte algae, however, did an organism whose descendants eventually conquered land on a global scale emerge: a likely branched filamentous—or even parenchymatous—organism that formed rhizoidal structures and experienced desiccation from time to time. From this "hypothetical hydro-terrestrial alga", the lineages of Zygnematophyceae and embryophytes (land plants) arose. In its infancy, the trajectory leading to the embryophytes was represented by the—now extinct—earliest land plants.

The earliest land plants probably interacted with beneficial substrate microbiota that aided them in obtaining nutrients from their substrate. Furthermore, the earliest land plants had to successfully overcome a barrage of terrestrial stressors (including ultraviolet light and photosynthetically active irradiance, drought, drastic temperature shifts, etc.). They succeeded because they had the right set of traits—a mix of adaptations that were selected for in their hydro-terrestrial algal ancestors, exaptations, and the potential for co-option of a fortuitous set of genes and pathways. During the course of evolution, some members of the populations of the earliest land plants gained traits that are adaptive in terrestrial environments (such as some form of water conductance, stomata-like structures, embryos, etc.); eventually, the "hypothetical last common ancestor of land plants" emerged. From this ancestor, the extant bryophytes and tracheophytes evolved. While the exact trait repertoire of the hypothetical last common ancestor of land plants is uncertain, it will certainly have entailed properties of vascular and non-vascular plants. What is also certain is that the last common ancestor of land plants had traits of algal ancestry.

== Marine plants ==
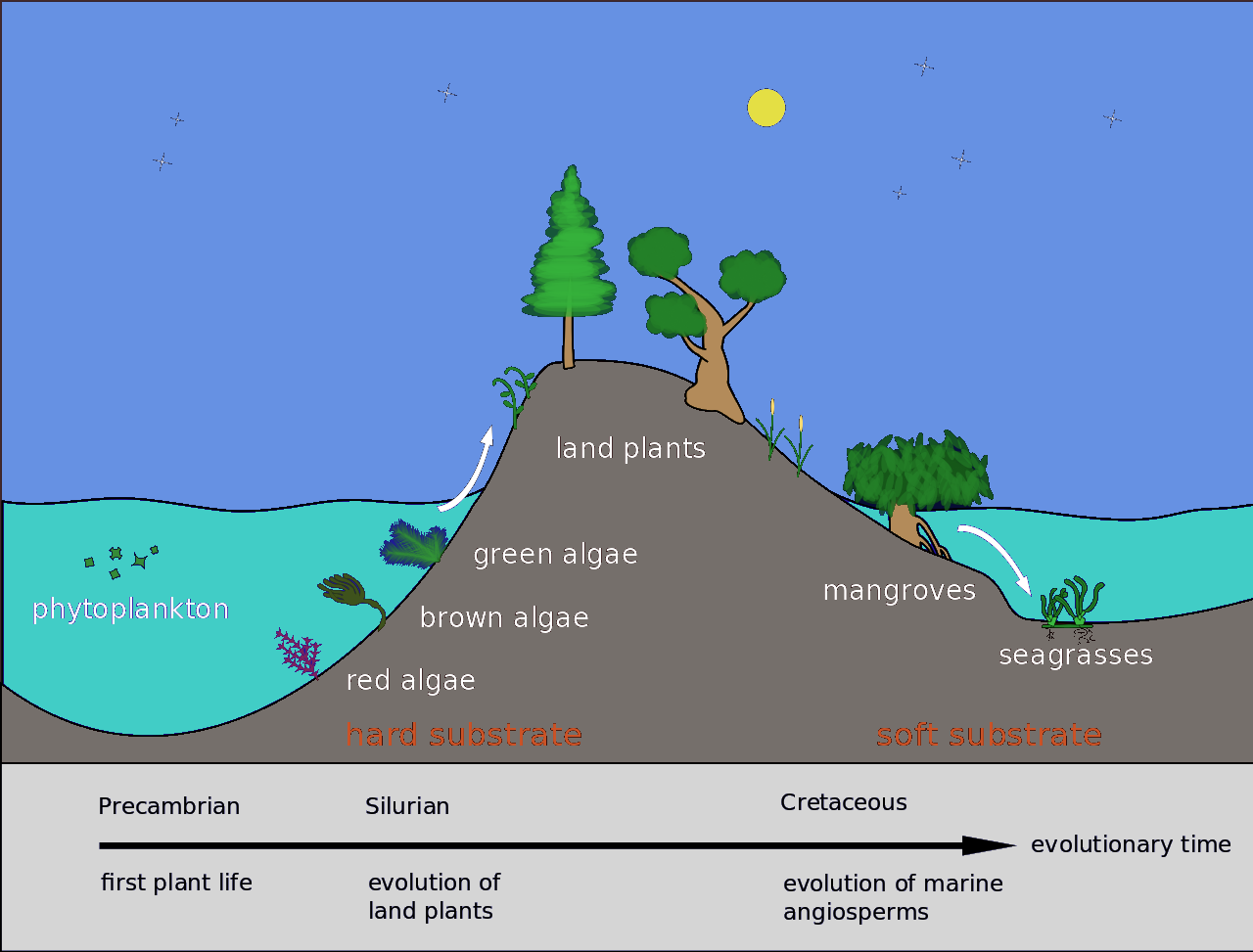
Evolution of mangroves and seagrasses

Back in the Silurian, some phytoplankton evolved into red, brown and green algae. Green algae then invaded the land and started evolving into the land plants we know today. Later, in the Cretaceous, some of these land plants returned to the sea as mangroves and seagrasses.

Plant life can flourish in the brackish waters of estuaries, where mangroves or cordgrass or beach grass might grow. Flowering plants grow in sandy shallows in the form of seagrass meadows, mangroves line the coast in tropical and subtropical regions and salt-tolerant plants thrive in regularly inundated salt marshes. All of these habitats are able to sequester large quantities of carbon and support a biodiverse range of larger and smaller animal life. Marine plants can be found in intertidal zones and shallow waters, such as seagrasses like eelgrass and turtle grass, Thalassia. These plants have adapted to the high salinity of the ocean environment.

Light is only able to penetrate the top 200 metres (660 ft) so this is the only part of the sea where plants can grow. The surface layers are often deficient in biologically active nitrogen compounds. The marine nitrogen cycle consists of complex microbial transformations which include the fixation of nitrogen, its assimilation, nitrification, anammox and denitrification. Some of these processes take place in deep water so that where there is an upwelling of cold waters, and also near estuaries where land-sourced nutrients are present, plant growth is higher. This means that the most productive areas, rich in plankton and therefore also in fish, are mainly coastal.

=== Mangroves ===
Mangroves provide important nursery habitats for marine life, acting as hiding and foraging places for larval and juvenile forms of larger fish and invertebrates. Based on satellite data, the total world area of mangrove forests was estimated in 2010 as 134,257 square kilometres (51,837 sq mi).

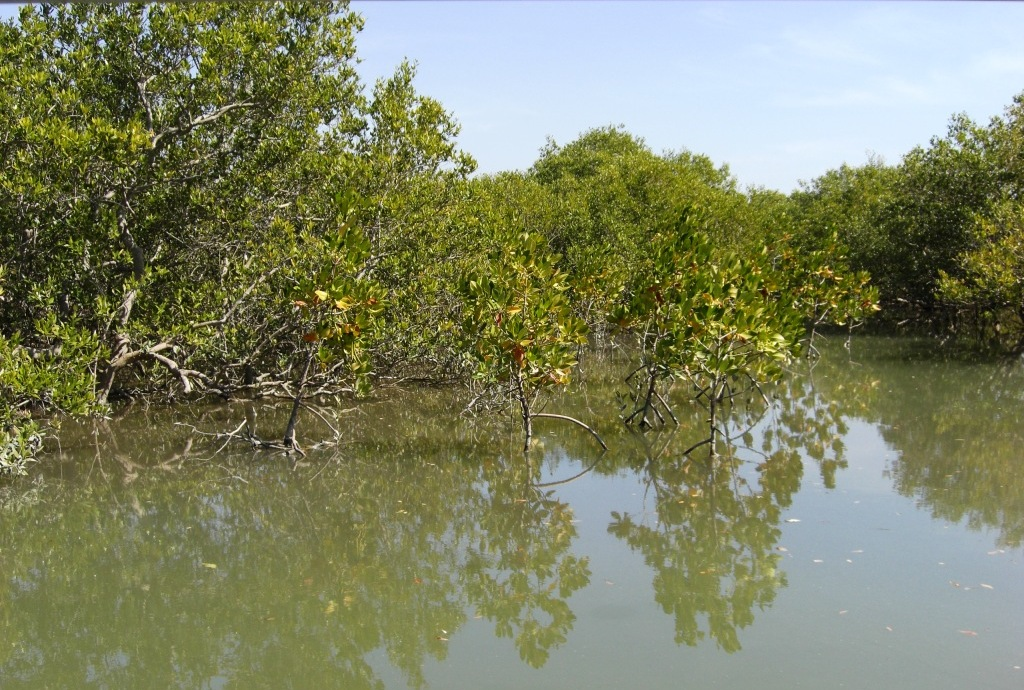
Mangroves

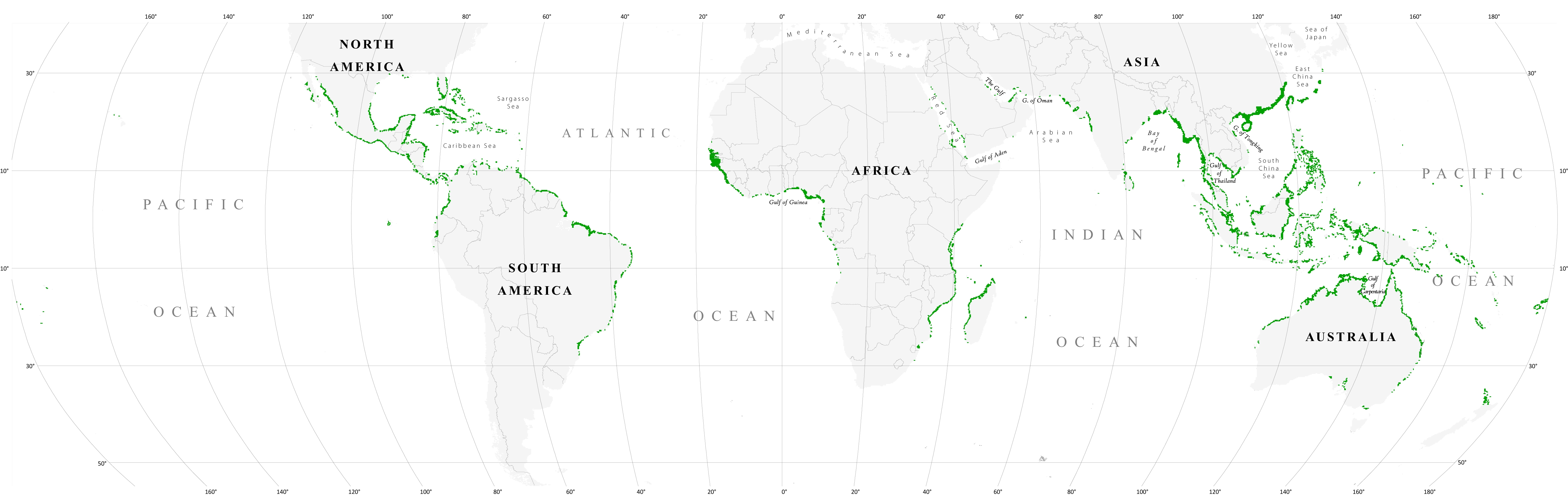
Global mangrove forests in 2000

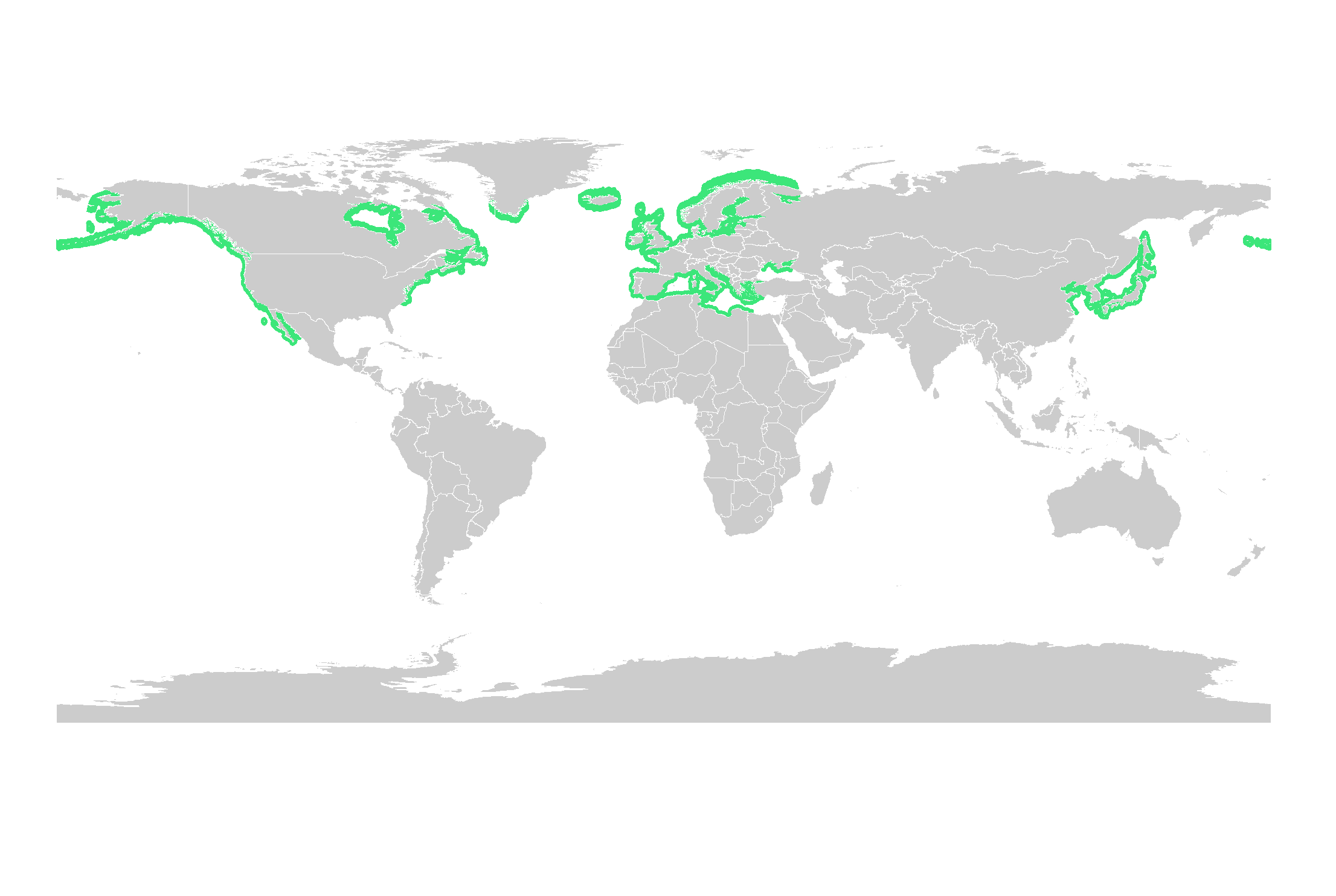
The seagrass common eelgrass according to IUCN data

- Spalding, M. (2010) World atlas of mangroves, Routledge. ISBN 9781849776608. doi:10.4324/9781849776608.

=== Seagrasses ===
Like mangroves, seagrasses provide important nursery habitats for larval and juvenile forms of larger fish and invertebrates. The total world area of seagrass meadows is more difficult to determine than mangrove forests, but was conservatively estimated in 2003 as 177,000 square kilometres (68,000 sq mi).

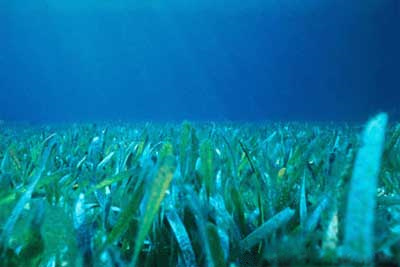
Seagrass meadow

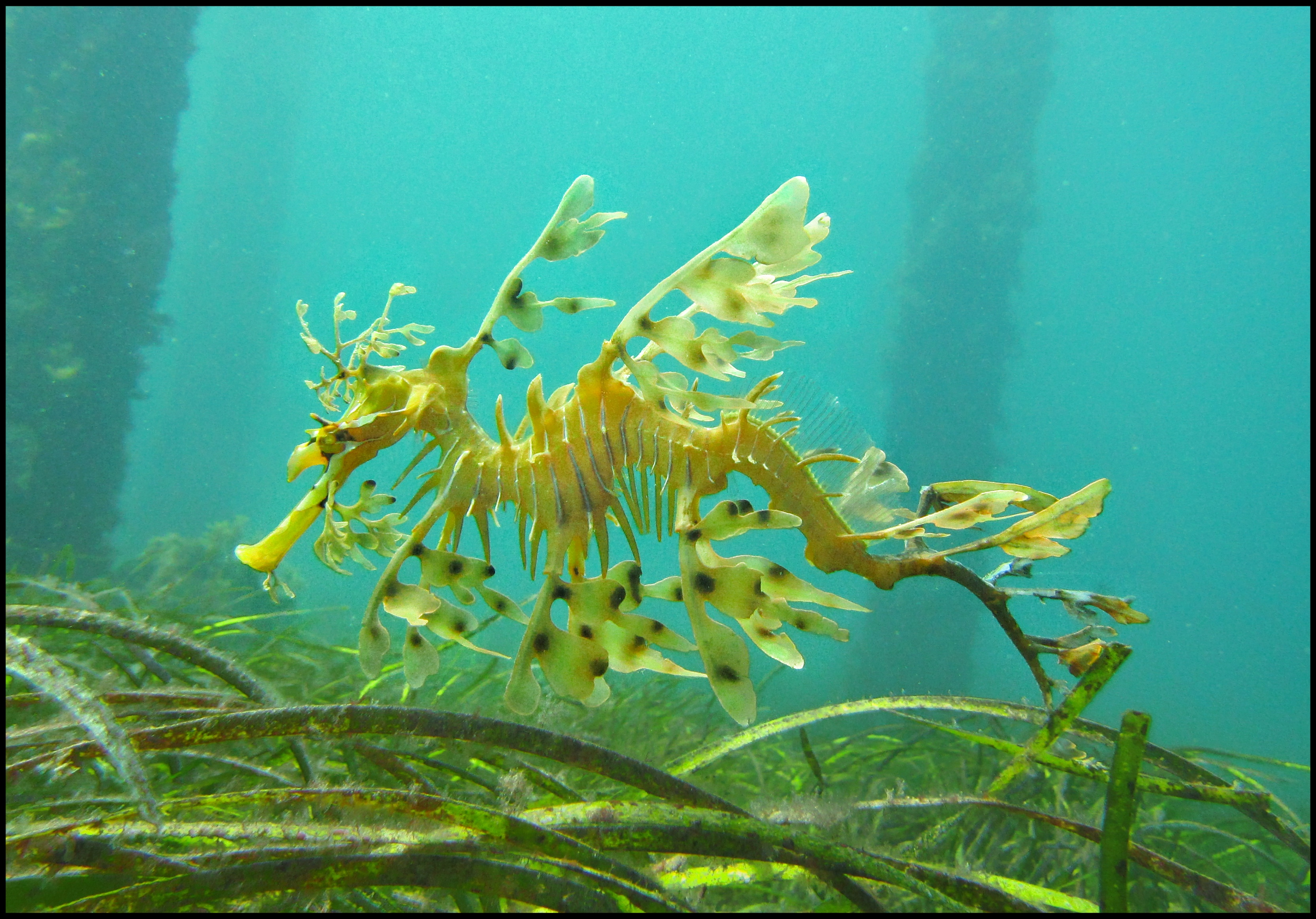
Sea dragons camouflaged to look like floating seaweed live in kelp forests and seagrass meadows

External videos
- How did multicellularity evolve? – Journey to the Microcosmos

== Stoichiometry ==
The stoichiometry (measurement of chemical reactants and products) of primary production in the surface ocean plays a crucial role in the cycling of elements in the global ocean. The ratio between the elements carbon (C), nitrogen (N), and phosphorus (P) in exported organic matter expressed in terms of the C:N:P ratio helps determine how much atmospheric carbon is sequestered in the deep ocean with respect to the availability of limiting nutrients. On geologic timescales, the N:P ratio reflects the relative availability of nitrate with respect to phosphate, both of which are externally supplied from the atmosphere via nitrogen fixation and/or continents via river supply and lost by denitrification and burial. On shorter timescales, the average stoichiometry of exported bulk particulate organic matter reflects the elemental stoichiometry of phytoplankton, with additional influences from biological diversity and secondary processing of organic matter by zooplankton and heterotrophic bacteria. In the face of global change, understanding and quantifying the mechanisms that lead to variability in C:N:P ratios are crucial in order to have an accurate projection of future climate change.

Likely response of P:C and N:C ratios in marine phytoplankton to major environmental drivers Illustration of how the five environmental drivers under a typical future climate scenario affect the cellular allocation of volume between P-rich (red), N-rich (blue), and C-rich (orange) pools.

A key unresolved question is what determines C:N:P of individual phytoplankton. Phytoplankton grows in the upper light-lit layer of the ocean, where the amount of inorganic nutrients, light, and temperature vary spatially and temporally. Laboratory studies show that these fluctuations trigger responses at the cellular level, whereby cells modify resource allocation in order to adapt optimally to their ambient environment. For example, phytoplankton may alter resource allocation between the P-rich biosynthetic apparatus, N-rich light-harvesting apparatus, and C-rich energy storage reserves. Under a typical future warming scenario, the global ocean is expected to undergo changes in nutrient availability, temperature, and irradiance. These changes are likely to have profound effects on the physiology of phytoplankton, and observations show that competitive phytoplankton species can acclimate and adapt to changes in temperature, irradiance, and nutrients on decadal timescales. Numerous laboratory and field experiments have been conducted that study the relationship between the C:N:P ratio of phytoplankton and environmental drivers. It is, however, challenging to synthesize those studies and generalize the response of phytoplankton C:N:P to changes in environmental drivers. Individual studies employ different sets of statistical analyses to characterize the effects of the environmental driver(s) on elemental ratios, ranging from a simple t test to more complex mixed models, which makes interstudy comparisons challenging. In addition, since environmentally induced trait changes are driven by a combination of plasticity (acclimation), adaptation, and life history, stoichiometric responses of phytoplankton can be variable even amongst closely related species.

Meta-analysis/systematic review is a powerful statistical framework for synthesizing and integrating research results obtained from independent studies and for uncovering general trends. The seminal synthesis by Geider and La Roche in 2002, as well as the more recent work by Persson et al. in 2010, has shown that C:P and N:P could vary by up to a factor of 20 between nutrient-replete and nutrient-limited cells. These studies have also shown that the C:N ratio can be modestly plastic due to nutrient limitation. A meta-analysis study by Hillebrand et al. in 2013 highlighted the importance of growth rate in determining elemental stoichiometry and showed that both C:P and N:P ratios decrease with the increasing growth rate. In 2015, Yvon-Durocher et al. investigated the role of temperature in modulating C:N:P. Although their dataset was limited to studies conducted prior to 1996, they have shown a statistically significant relationship between C:P and temperature increase. MacIntyre et al. (2002) and Thrane et al. (2016) have shown that irradiance plays an important role in controlling optimal cellular C:N and N:P ratios. Most recently, Moreno and Martiny (2018) provided a comprehensive summary of how environmental conditions regulate cellular stoichiometry from a physiological perspective.

The elemental stoichiometry of marine phytoplankton plays a critical role in global biogeochemical cycles through its impact on nutrient cycling, secondary production, and carbon export. Although extensive laboratory experiments have been carried out over the years to assess the influence of different environmental drivers on the elemental composition of phytoplankton, a comprehensive quantitative assessment of the processes is still lacking. Here, the responses of P:C and N:C ratios of marine phytoplankton have been synthesized to five major drivers (inorganic phosphorus, inorganic nitrogen, inorganic iron, irradiance, and temperature) by a meta-analysis of experimental data across 366 experiments from 104 journal articles. These results show that the response of these ratios to changes in macronutrients is consistent across all the studies, where the increase in nutrient availability is positively related to changes in P:C and N:C ratios. The results show that eukaryotic phytoplankton are more sensitive to the changes in macronutrients compared to prokaryotes, possibly due to their larger cell size and their abilities to regulate their gene expression patterns quickly. The effect of irradiance was significant and constant across all studies, where an increase in irradiance decreased both P:C and N:C. The P:C ratio decreased significantly with warming, but the response to temperature changes was mixed depending on the culture growth mode and the growth phase at the time of harvest. Along with other oceanographic conditions of the subtropical gyres (e.g., low macronutrient availability), the elevated temperature may explain why P:C is consistently low in subtropical oceans. Iron addition did not systematically change either P:C or N:C.

== Evolutionary timeline ==
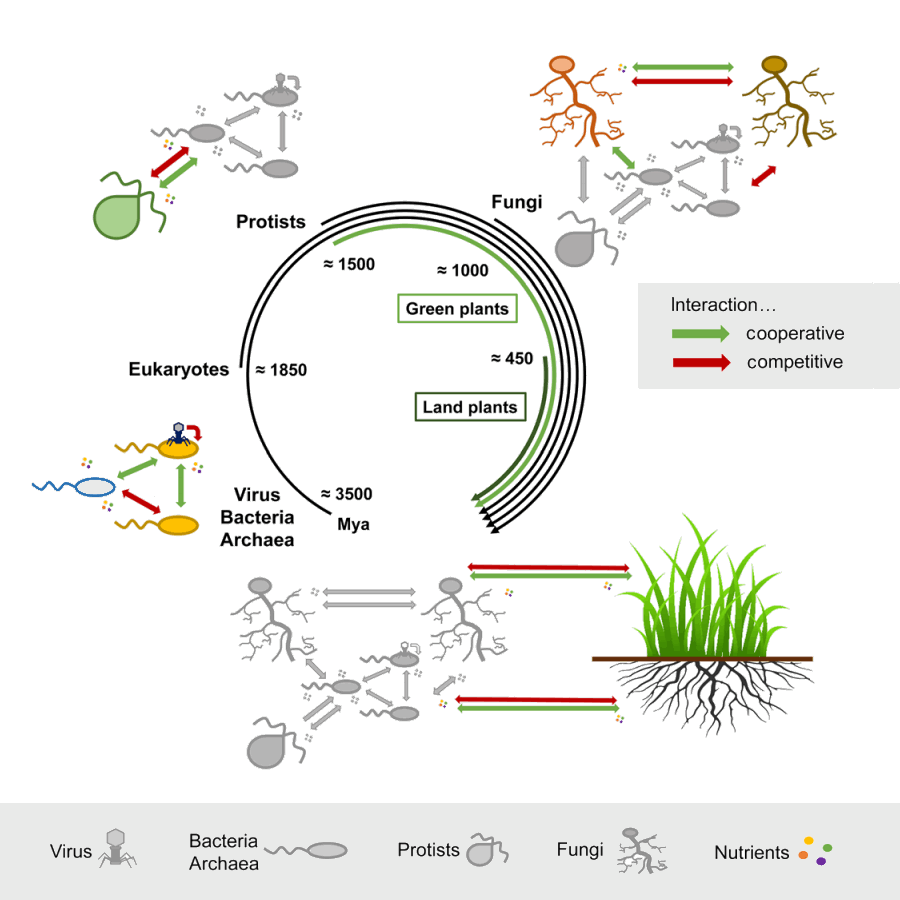
Evolutionary timeline of microbe-plant interactions Microbial interactions outlined at the evolutionary scale, showing plant-microbe interactions occurring relatively recently compared to the more ancestral interactions among bacteria or between different microbial kingdoms. Both competitive (red) and cooperative (green) interactions within and between microbial kingdoms are depicted. Mya, million years ago. Evolutionary divergence estimated from Lücking et al., 2009 and Heckmanet al., 2001.

Earth's biogeologic clock

== See also ==
- Algae
- Aquatic plants
- Biological pump
- Evolutionary history of plants
- Oceanic carbon cycle
- Plant evolution
- Timeline of plant evolution
- Evolution of photosynthesis
