= Rhynchopus =

Scientific classification
- Domain: Eukaryota
- Clade: Discoba
- Phylum: Euglenozoa
- Class: Diplonemea
- Order: Diplonemida
- Family: Diplonemidae
- Genus: Rhynchopus; Skuja 1948

Type species
- Rhynchopus amitus Skuja 1948

Species
- R. amitus Skuja 1948; R. coscinodiscivorus Schnepf 1994; R. euleeides Roy et al. 2007; R. humris Tashyreva et al. 2018; R. littoralensis Kufferath 1950; R. serpens Tashyreva et al. 2018

Genus of protozoans

Rhynchopus is a genus of flagellate excavates in the class Diplonemea. They usually have flagella of different lengths and a single subapical opening with the flagellar pocket openings and adjacent feeding apparatus merging into one. When food is scarce, mobile flagellated cells are produced, suggesting the presence of a fully flagellated and dispersive phase in the life cycle, serving to distinguish Rhynchopus from Diplonema. Most species are free-living, others are symbionts and R. coscinodiscivorus is an intracellular parasite of diatoms.

== Species ==
The type species, R. amitus, has been described in Baltic plankton. It has an elongated pear shaped body, often more concave on one side than the other. A disc separates the flagellar apparatus ingestion pocket and two flagella pocket as they emerge from the cell. They have been found feeding on planktonic diatoms cytoplasm and gills of crayfish and crabs. In addition to the mobile phase flagellate stages also produces a cyst.

Rhynchopus euleeides is a free-living marine flagellate. In the trophic stage, the cells are predominantly elliptical and flattened laterally, but often change their shape . Slippage is the predominant form of locomotion. The two flagella, which are normally hidden in the sub-apical pocket, are short and of unequal length and have conventional axonemes, but seems to lack the paraxonemales rods. Swimmer cells, which are only occasionally seen, are smaller and have two conspicuous flagella, more than twice the length of the body.
