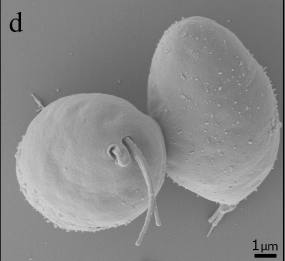
- Scanning electron micrograph of Diplonema papillatum

Scientific classification
- Domain: Eukaryota
- Clade: Discoba
- Phylum: Euglenozoa
- Class: Diplonemea
- Order: Diplonemida
- Family: Diplonemidae
- Genus: Diplonema; Griessmann 1913

Type species
- Diplonema breviciliatum Griessmann 1913

Species
- D. aggregatum Tashyreva et al. 2018; D. ambulator Larsen & Patterson 1990; D. breviciliatum Griessmann 1913; D. japonicum Tashyreva et al. 2018; D. nigricans (Schuster, Goldstein & Hershenow 1968) Triemer & Ott 1990; D. papillatum (Porter 1973) Triemer & Ott 1990; D. metabolicum Larsen & Patterson1990

Synonyms
- Isonema Schuster, Goldstein & Hershenow 1968 non Brown non Cassini 1817 non Maas 1909 non Meek & Worthen 1865 non Hall 1891; Lackeymonas Skvortzov 1969; Teixeiramonas Skvortzov 1969; ?Flagellamonas Skvortzov 1969; ?Kolbeana Skvortzov 1966 ex Skvortzov 1972; ?Lowymonas Skvortzov 1969; ?Milaneziamonas Skvortzov 1969; ?Spira Skvortzov 1969 non Bastian 1865 non Brown 1844; Diplosonema Doweld, 2001

= Diplonema =

Genus of protist

Diplonema is a genus of free-living organisms in the Euglenozoa. They are distinguished from Rhynchopus in Class Diplonemea by the absence of a fully flagellate dispersive stage.

== Characteristics ==
Diplonema feature two short flagella of equal length and two subapical openings. Most are free living, but there have been reported cases of infection in clams and sudden decomposition of aquarium plants. It was described initially in 1913 and later rediscovered in the 60s and called Isonema, wrongly classified among euglenids.
