= Hemistasia =

- Anatomy of Hemistasia phaeocysticola

Scientific classification
- Domain: Eukaryota
- Clade: Discoba
- Phylum: Euglenozoa
- Class: Diplonemea
- Order: Diplonemida
- Family: Hemistasiidae
- Genus: Hemistasia; Griessmann, 1913

Type species
- Hemistasia phaeocysticola (Scherffel) Elbrächter, Schnepf & Balzer, 1996

Species
- Hemistasia amylophaga (G.A.Klebs) Won J.Lee, 2002; Hemistasia phaeocysticola (Scherffel) Elbrächter, Schnepf & Balzer, 1996

Genus of kinetoplastids

Hemistasia is a genus of predatory hemistasiid diplonemids, probably widely distributed in marine environments. They hunt diatoms, dinoflagellates, haptophytes, and copepods.

== Characteristics ==
The type species, H. phaeocysticola, is a phagotrophic organism with heterodynamic flagella and a pronounced apical rostrum. Its "mouth," or cytostome, is located on the rostrum and leads to the cytopharynx. The rostrum is covered with hairs 0.2 µm long. The flagellar pocket is near the rostrum; beneath it are numerous vesicular organelles, as well as the nucleus and extrusomes. A digestion vacuole at the posterior of the cell occupies a significant portion of its space.
