= Hemistasiidae =

- Hemistasia

Scientific classification
- Domain: Eukaryota
- Clade: Discoba
- Phylum: Euglenozoa
- Class: Diplonemea
- Order: Diplonemida
- Family: Hemistasiidae; Cavalier-Smith, 2016

Genera
- Artemidia; Hemistasia; Namystynia

Family of single-celled organisms

Hemistasiidae is a family of biflagellate diplomenids. They are predatory (eukaryotic) or detritivorous organisms that primarily inhabit coastal waters.

They differ from other diplomenids by the presence of peripheral lacunae, battery of extrusomes, a large digestion vacuole in the posterior cell region, and permanent paraflagellar rods on both flagella.
