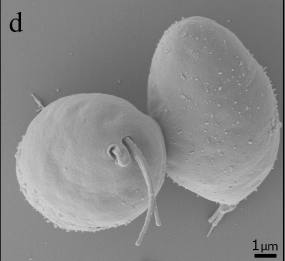
- Diplonema papillatum

Scientific classification
- Domain: Eukaryota
- Supergroup: Discoba
- Phylum: Euglenozoa
- Subphylum: Glycomonada
- Class: Diplonemea; Cavalier-Smith, 1993
- Order: Diplonemida; Cavalier-Smith, 1993

Families
- Diplonemidae; Hemistasiidae; Eupelagonemidae

Synonyms
- Rhynchopodaceae Skuja, 1948 ex Cavalier-Smith, 1993

= Diplonemid =

Class of protozoans

Diplonemea is a class of biflagellated unicellular protists. Organisms are generally colourless and oblong in shape, with two flagella emerging from a subapical pocket. They possess a large mitochondrial genome composed of fragmented linear DNA. These non-coding sequences must be massively trans-spliced, making it one of the most complicated post-transcriptional editing process known to eukaryotes.

== History ==
Primary studies made in the 20th century by Griessmann and Skuja had initially grouped Diplonemea (or more specifically, the Diplonema and Rhynchopus taxa) with the euglenids. The two groups sharing many morphological similarities such as metaboly, locomotion and a microtubule-reinforced feeding apparatus. This conclusion met with some controversy, however, because diplonemids lack characteristic features shared by all euglenids, such as possession of pellicle strips and paraxonemal rods on their flagella.

Diplonemids were then placed in the euglenozoan phylum and shared this taxon with the kinetoplastids and euglenids. The inclusion of Rhynchopus and Diplonema in the class Diplonemea was later confirmed through nuclear 18S rRNA analysis. As of 2026, Rhynchopus and Diplonema are part of the 'classical' diplonemid subgroup, and Hemistasia is part of the 'nonclassical' diplonemid subgroup.

There had been debates as to whether Diplonemea were more closely related to the euglenids or kinetoplastids. After analysis of cytosolic heat shock proteins, a sister relationship between the diplonemids and kinetoplastids was proposed. It was further supported through phylogenetic analysis, which discovered that Diplonemea possess a functional splice leader RNA that is characteristic of the kinetoplastids. Additionally, the amino acid tryptophan is encoded by codon TGA in kinetoplastids and diplonemids, whereas in euglenids, the regular codon is used instead.

Despite these similarities between kinetoplastids and diplonemids, the two taxa are distinct. Diplonemea lack a kinetoplast, and have a unique bi-flagellated trophic phase not seen in kinetoplastids. Currently the kinetoplastids are regarded as a sister group to the Diplonemea.

Although there are only three named genera within the Diplonemea, environmental sequencing performed by the TARA Ocean Expedition concluded there are potentially thousands of genera, suggesting that pelagic Diplonemea are the most diverse planktonic eukaryotes in the oceans.

== Habitat and ecology ==
Although Diplonemea are generally predators, some species display parasitic life strategies. Diplonemea display a rich diversity in marine and freshwater environments, with their relative abundance increasing with depth. The diplonemids that exist in these different environments are genetically distinct, and exhibit slightly different lifestyles. The 'classic' diplonemids (i.e. Diplonema and Rhynchopus) are benthic, whereas the marine diplonemids, which include Hemistasia, are planktonic.

There are potentially thousands of unknown marine Diplonemea species, with this diversity highly stratified in accordance to depth. Although molecular sequencing confirms the existence of these unnamed marine Diplonemea, information regarding their morphology and lifestyle is absent. As marine Diplonemea are the most abundant and genetically diverse protists (and potentially eukaryotes) in the sea, there are strong implications that they play a key role in aquatic ecosystems. As of now, this exact role is unknown.

== Description ==
=== Morphology and anatomy ===
Classical diplonemids (i.e. Diplonema and Rhynchopus), are colourless and oblong in shape. They are approximately 20 μm in length and possess a microtubule layer underneath their plasma membrane. Adjacent to it is a mitochondrion with discoidal cristae. They also possess two flagella of equal length, both of which lack paraxial rods. The two basal bodies originate from a subapical pocket, which merges with an adjacent feeding apparatus. This feeding apparatus is surrounded by many food vacuoles and reinforced by microtubules.

Nonclassical Diplonemea (i.e. Hemistasia) are diverse in size but share many morphological aspects with the classic diplonemids. However, a great majority of these marine Diplonemea have never been seen, with their existence only confirmed through molecular analysis.

Although Diplonemea do not possess pellicular strips like euglenids, they still move via metaboly.

Diplonemea also exhibit the compartmentalization of glycolytic and gluconeogenic enzymes into peroxisomes. These organelles are referred to as glycosomes, and is a characteristic feature also shared with their sister taxon, the kinetoplastids.

=== Life cycles ===
Diplonemea are capable of sexual reproduction, as genes involved in meiosis have been found. Although marine diplonemids appear to reproduce sexually, not much is known about diplonemid reproduction as euglenozoans rarely demonstrate sexual processes.

=== Genetics ===
Diplonemea have a unique mitochondrial DNA arrangement. Although Diplonemea possess a large mitochondrial genome, these do not contain any intact full-sized genes. Instead, their mitochondrial DNA consists of linear gene fragments of different sizes. Because each fragment is both full of repeats and incomplete, individually they are unable to code for a gene themselves. Instead, fragments are transcribed and spliced together using their own specialized trans splicing machinery. Once spliced together, the transcript undergoes extensive editing to become recognizable RNA. This is accomplished by either Uracil-insertion, nucleotide deanimation, or substitution, which eventually generates a fully mature and translatable transcript.

The Diplonemea genome contains a spliced leader RNA gene, which confirms their use of mRNA spliceosome-dependent trans splicing during nuclear expression.

Diplonemids possess the gap3 gene which is specifically found in cyanobacteria and Pseudomonadota. This is likely due to lateral gene transfer following the divergence of diplonemids from the euglenoids. As to date, this is one of the most-supported examples of lateral gene transfer from a bacterium to eukaryote and may have implications for diplonemid acquisition of biochemical abilities.

== Taxonomy ==
Although presently there are fewer than a dozen named species, the existence of thousands of unknown diplonemid taxa has been suggested through environmental sequencing analyses. The class currently includes one order, three families and ten genera.

- Class Diplonemea Cavalier-Smith, 1993
  - Order Diplonemida Cavalier-Smith, 1993
    - Family Diplonemidae Cavalier-Smith, 1993
      - Genus Diplonema Griesmann, 1914
      - Genus Rhynchopus Skuja, 1948
      - Genus Lacrimia Tashyreva, Prokopchuk, Horák and Lukeš in Tashyreva et al., 2018
      - Genus Flectonema Tashyreva, Prokopchuk, Horák and Lukeš in Tashyreva et al., 2018
      - Genus Sulcionema Tashyreva, Prokopchuk, Horák and Lukeš in Tashyreva et al., 2018
      - Genus Natarhynchopus Tashyreva, Horák and Lukeš in Tashyreva et al., 2025
    - Family Hemistasiidae Cavalier-Smith, 2016
      - Genus Hemistasia Griesmann, 1914
      - Genus Namystinia Prokopchuk, Tashyreva and Lukeš in Prokopchuk et al., 2019
      - Genus Artemidia Prokopchuk, Tashyreva and Lukeš in Prokopchuk et al., 2019
    - Family Eupelagonemidae Okamoto and Keeling in Okamoto et al., 2019
      - Genus Eupelagonema Okamoto and Keeling in Okamoto et al., 2019
