= Pond life =

Organisms found in freshwater ponds

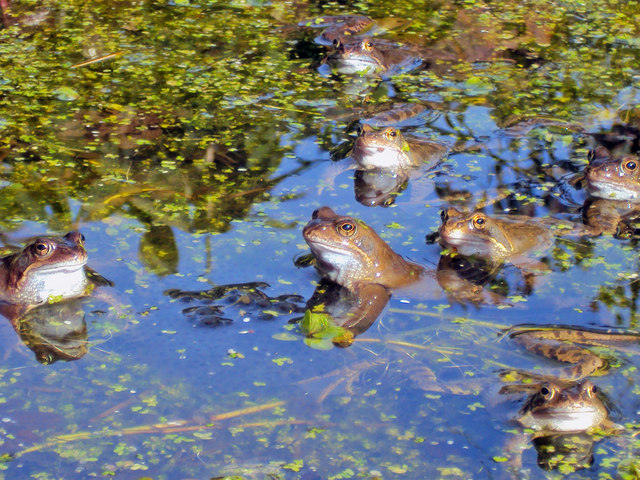
Frogs in a pond

Pond life is an umbrella term for all life forms found in ponds. Although there is considerable overlap with the species lists for small lakes and even slow-flowing rivers, pond life includes some species not found elsewhere, and as a biome it represents a unique assemblage of species.

To survive in a pond, any organism needs to be able to tolerate extremes of temperature, including being frozen in ice and surviving complete drying out of the pond. Survival techniques include the production of resting eggs that can survive ice and desiccation, using the pond for only part of the life-cycle, and having overwintering stages such as turions buried in the mud.

== Population and dispersal ==
Ponds are ephemeral in geologic time and are frequently man-made as remnants of clay digging, borrow pits or abandoned quarries. They may only exist for a few years in some cases. Organisms that favour living in ponds must have capabilities for reaching ponds, reproducing there and the capability to populate other ponds. Without these capabilities, they would not survive.

For many organisms including bacteria, fungi, protozoa, rotifers, bryozoa, cnidaria and small arthropods, the principal colonisation vector is wind-blown spores or eggs, often from drying muddy edges of one pond to another.

Other common vectors include birds carrying pond material and defecating seeds of plants. This is probably the most common transfer route for molluscs, annelids, planarian and plant vegetative fragments and probably the specialist water spider that lives underwater.

Insects typically find their own way by flying. This includes many of the pond specialist such as whirligig beetle, water boatman, water measurer and many types of mosquito, gnat and midge and even the heavy Dytiscus.

Ponds provide a useful resource for larger mammals, birds and plants. If unaffected by human activity, ponds are often surrounded by trees as the local water table is typically raised because of the pond water. These trees in turn provide nesting and feeding opportunities for many bird species. Ponds also support larger mammals including water shrew and water vole. Badger setts are commonly found in pond banks where the ground slopes, and other mammals such as foxes and domestic cattle and horses use ponds as a drinking water supply. All these animals and birds can also be vectors for pond-dwelling organisms.

== Animals with overwintering eggs ==
Typical pond animals with overwintering egg stages include

- Daphnia which produce eggs when conditions deteriorate, especially in autumn.
- Cyclops
- Hydra species including Hydra viridissima and Hydra oligactis
- Bryozoa such as Plumatella fungosa and Cristatella which live in colonies and produce distinctive over-wintering eggs.

== Animals that use ponds for only part of their development ==
- China mark moths – caterpillars live on submerged leaves in the summer.
- Caddis fly – larvae live in cases in the pond and may overwinter there but produce free-flying adults at maturity.
- Dragonfly and damselfly which spend up to three years as voracious aquatic larvae before emerging and undergo ecdysis to form flying adults.
- Amphibia such as frogs, toads and newts although some newt species may spend most of the year in the pond.

== Animals adapted to ephemeral ponds ==
- Fairy shrimps – are only found in ephemeral ponds and soda lakes.

== Plants adapted to pond life ==
Many of the macrophytes associated with ponds are also found in lakes and alongside, or in, running water. However, a number of species of algae are strongly associated with ponds. These include Volvox, a free-floating colonial alga which produces daughter colonies inside the maternal sphere, and was first observed by one of the early microscopes by Leeuwenhoek in 1770.

Diatoms, desmids and many species of filamentous green algae such as Spirogyra are commonly found in shallow muddy areas.

The carnivorous plant Utricularia vulgaris, a specialist in acid ponds, overwinters by producing turions that fall to the bottom of the pond and produce new plants in the spring. Other pond plants that also use this method include Potamogeton species and some Microphylum species.

The lack of flow in ponds provide habitats for plants that are not anchored. These include several species of Lemna and the liverwort, Ricciocarpos natans.

== Scientific significance ==
Pond life has made significant contributions to science. Ponds are commonplace in many countries and are readily accessible and their contents are easy to sample.

The earliest work on the light microscope by Leeuwenhoek used pond organisms to demonstrate the capabilities of the new instrument

"he discovered at least three forms of life. Green streaks in a spiral (now called Spirogyra) and two kinds of animalcules – apparently what we called Rotifers and Euglena viridis.

Ponds and the organisms living in them have long been a source of interest to children as well as naturalists for the sheer abundance and interest of their biota.

== Noteworthy species ==
There is a great diversity of life forms found in ponds, especially microscopic life. These include the largest free-living protozoan known – Stentor, the toughest animal known – the tardigrade or "Water bear". The globes of Volvox, the delicate feeding behaviour of Hydra or the transparent exoskeleton of Daphnia which enables all its internal organs, including its beating heart to be easily viewed.

== As a pejorative ==
In the UK, "pond life" is used as a pejorative term to refer to people that one does not like. It is analogous to the term "pond scum" in the United States.

In the UK context, it was used as the title of an episode of Doctor Who.
