= Green world hypothesis =

Hypothesis that predators are the primary regulators of ecosystems

The green world hypothesis proposes that predators are the primary regulators of ecosystems: they are the reason the world is 'green', by regulating the herbivores that would otherwise consume all the greenery. It is also known as the HSS hypothesis, after Hairston, Smith and Slobodkin, the authors of the seminal paper on the subject.

Although plenty of herbivores exist that would potentially diminish the vegetation of the world, many researchers find themselves asking the question of how biomass and biodiversity are able to be maintained. The natural order to allow for the persistence of all species and ecosystems requires an opposite force acting upon these herbivores. A system of checks and balances is proposed in allowing the flourishing of flora in various ecosystems, as suggested by the green world hypothesis. In addition to plant defense mechanisms, predators assist in the regulation of these herbivore population numbers, limiting the amount of vegetation that is consumed. Several ecosystems are characterized by a trophic cascade system, in which all levels interact and impact the persistence of one another. For example, the herbivores reduce plant populations, but are kept in check by carnivorous consumers that limit population growth beyond what's allotted given resource availability.

The study of trophic cascades is highly important to understanding the green world hypothesis. One way that trophic cascades can impact ecosystems is through the limitation of net primary productivity, which determines energy flow, through various resources. This bottom-up approach results in the abundance of unpalatable plant species due to various environmental conditions. Additionally, energy in a given system can be determined by predators at the highest trophic level, or the carnivores that consume other carnivores. This top-down approach is characterized by high consumer densities, and in many cases, weedy plant systems, without strong initial defense mechanisms in place. These processes of the maintenance of trophic cascades often operate simultaneously. A general consensus is that trophic cascades tend to have a larger effect in aquatic ecosystems compared to terrestrial. However, overregulation in any of these communities has the potential to result in the degradation of the trophic cascade within the system, preventing growth across many species of all levels.

== History ==
The green world hypothesis was likely first proposed in a 1957 course by Frederick Edward Smith at the University of Michigan.

In 1960, Nelson Hairston, Smith, and Lawrence Slobodkin published a paper laying out the green world hypothesis. The name HSS derives from the first letters of each of their surnames.

Robert T. Paine did experiments in 1966 with Pisaster ochraceus which illustrated their role as a keystone species in regulating Mytilus californianus. In this study, Paine observed that biodiversity and ecosystem persistence in intertidal zones were highly dependent upon sea star presence (Ceci, 2020). Although this is recognized as a keystone species, Paine’s research allowed for this discovery to be made, noticing that mussels, anemones, alga, among other species reduced quantities following the decrease in sea star numbers (Ceci, 2020). This is a strong example of the importance of the maintenance of the trophic cascade and suggests that top-down control is the primary regulatory factor in this system.

James Estes and John Palmisano did similar experiments with otters, sea urchins, and kelp, where otter presence increased kelp presence in a trophic cascade. As discussed in this study, sea otters, natural consumers of sea urchins, have allowed for the flourishing of kelp forests. Without the assistance and presence of these otterns, sea urchin biomass would be allowed to increase, which would likely pose a significant threat to the ecosystem. The absence of sea otters in the ecosystem results in the near elimination of kelp forests, forming an ecological concept known as urchin barrens (Siliman and Angelini, 2012).

John Terborgh examined Venezuelan valleys with and without predators in 2006, demonstrating the green world hypothesis on land.

== Criticism ==
The plant self-defense hypothesis proposes that plants are not entirely consumed by herbivores primarily because of their adaptations against it (thorns, toxicity, cellulose, etc.).
