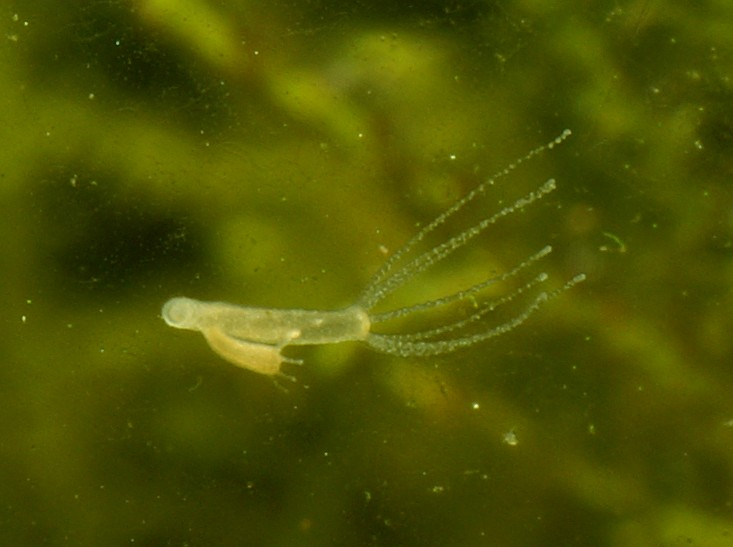

Scientific classification
- Kingdom: Animalia
- Phylum: Cnidaria
- Class: Hydrozoa
- Order: Anthoathecata
- Family: Hydridae
- Genus: Hydra
- Species: H. vulgaris

Binomial name
- Hydra vulgaris Pallas, 1766

Synonyms
- Hydra attenuata; Hydra magnipapillata

= Hydra vulgaris =

Species of cnidarian

Hydra vulgaris, the fresh-water polyp, is a small freshwater hydroid with length from 10 mm to 30 mm and width about 1 mm.

== Description ==
The hydra have four to twelve tentacles that protrude from just outside the mouth. They feed by extending their tentacles and waiting for food to touch the tentacles. They then bring the food to their mouth, ingest and digest the organism. Anything that cannot be digested is egested. Ingestion and egestion occur through the mouth.

Like other hydras, Hydra vulgaris cling to a base object with a "foot" pad, shaped like a disk. The Hydra moves by releasing its grip on its base and is carried away by the current. H. vulgaris can also move by bending over, grabbing a surface with its tentacles, releasing its grip with its "foot" and flipping over itself.

== Model organism ==
H. vulgaris is often used, like many hydra, as a model organism for morphallactic regeneration because they are easy to care for, requiring minimal direct care, and reproduce relatively quickly. H. vulgaris are known to replace and replicate body parts by regeneration. This is done by their stem cells found in their tissues lining their main body's stalk. This is possible due to early adulthood which allows them replicate body parts if they were to face an injury. It is reported that they do not undergo senescence, making them biologically immortal although this has been disputed.

== Neurology ==
Having the simplest nervous system of any known organism, the neurology of H. vulgaris is of interest to the neuroscience community, in the hopes that understanding such simple circuitry will be a precedent for understanding the more complex function of brains. The nervous system and resulting behaviors have been extensively studied by Rafael Yuste et al. As of 2021, H. vulgaris is the only animal for which the connection between its neural structure and every single one of its behaviors has been solved, with the exception of the neural code of the neurons themselves.

== Reproduction ==
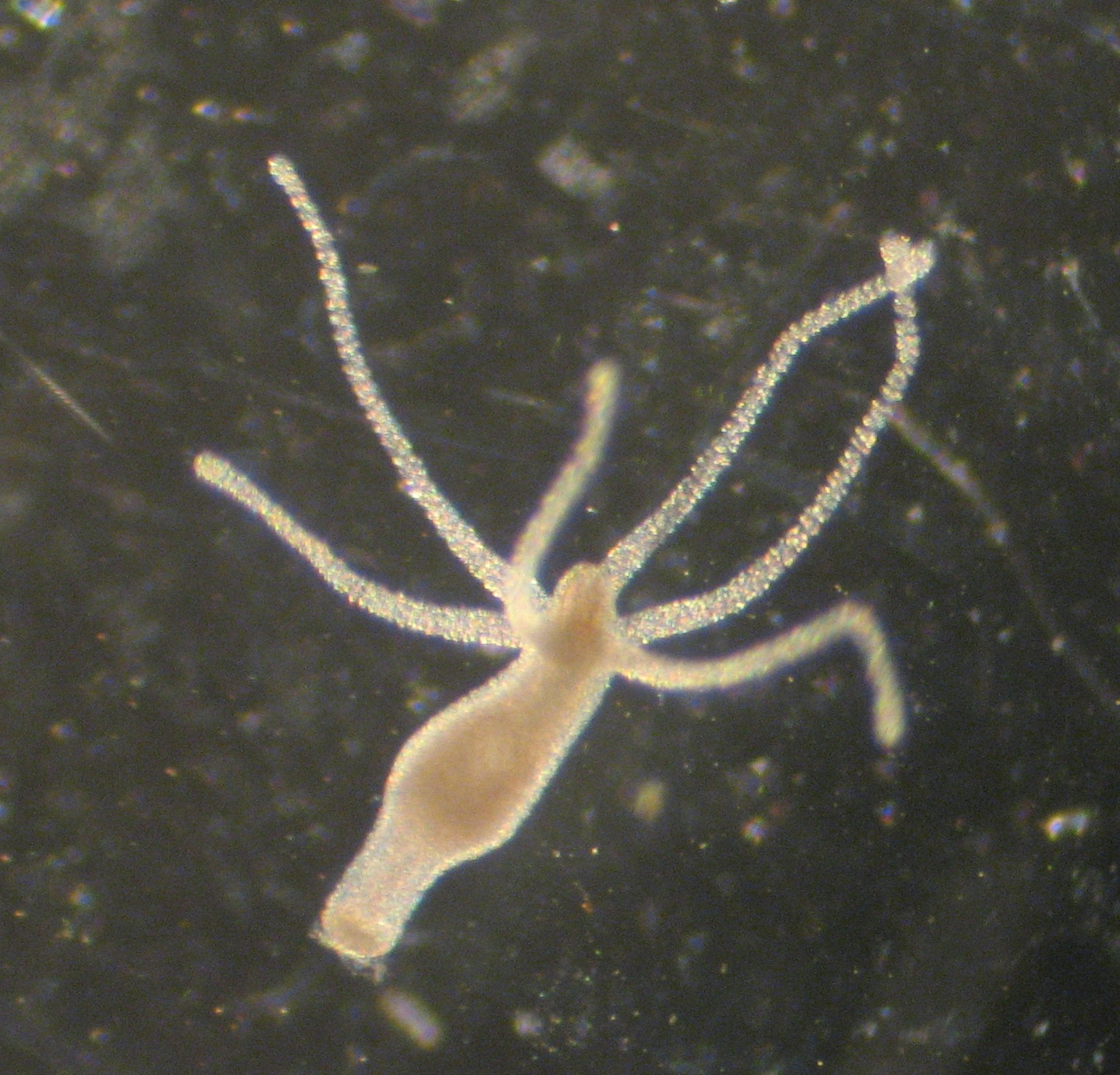
Hydra oligactis

This species can reproduce in three ways: sexual reproduction, budding, and indirectly through regeneration.

When hydra reproduce sexually, simple testes, ovaries, or both will develop on the bodies of an individual. Sperm released into the environment by the testes enters the egg within the ovary. The egg forms a chitinous exoskeleton and waits for favorable conditions before the organism will emerge.

Budding occurs when conditions are favorable; proper water temperature and enough food are the major factors. A miniature adult hydra will grow out of the body of the parent hydra. Once fully developed, it will separate from the parent and continue the life cycle. Hydras use this kind of reproduction more often because it is easier and will create more hydras than other methods.

The third method of reproduction is more of a survival mechanism than a reproduction mechanism. When a hydra is cut into segments, each segment, if large enough, will grow into an individual hydra sized relative to the size of the segment. This happens in other animals, such as the starfish.
