= Eutreptia =

Scientific classification
- Domain: Eukaryota
- Clade: Discoba
- Phylum: Euglenozoa
- Class: Euglenida
- Clade: Euglenophyceae
- Order: Eutreptiales
- Family: Eutreptiaceae
- Genus: Eutreptia; Perty, 1852

Type species
- Eutreptia viridis Perty

Genus of algae

Eutreptia is a genus of Euglenozoa belonging to the family Eutreptiaceae (Eutreptiidae). The genus was first described by Maximilian Perty in 1852. It has a cosmopolitan distribution, and is most commonly found in marine or brackish waters; however, some species have also been reported from freshwater.

== Description ==
Eutreptia consists of single, free-swimming cells that are spindle-shaped with pronounced euglenoid movement (metaboly). Two heterodynamic flagella are present, both highly active while swimming, with a reddish eyespot near the base. Eutreptia is photosynthetic with green chloroplasts; there may be numerous discoid or ribbon-shaped chloroplasts, often radiating from central pyrenoids surrounded by grains of paramylon. The chloroplast structure is similar to that of Euglena viridis, but in Eutreptia what appears to be a stellate chloroplast actually consists complex of ribbon-shaped chloroplasts each with a terminal pyrenoid. While swimming, it rotates along the longitudinal axis; sometimes the cells creep along a substrate (in mucus).

Reproduction occurs through longitudinal cell division. It sometimes forms a palmelloid stage in which cells divide repeatedly.

== Taxonomy ==
Eutreptia is distinguished from the related genus Eutreptiella in that the two flagella are of nearly equal length, while Eutreptia has flagella of markedly unequal lengths.

Species are distinguished based on the size and shape of cells, length of flagella, and presence of pyrenoids.

Species:

- Eutreptia globulifera Goor
- Eutreptia lanowii Steuer
- Eutreptia papillifera Péterfi
- Eutreptia pascheri Skvortsov
- Eutreptia pertyi Pringsheim
- Eutreptia pyrenoidifera Matvienko
- Eutreptia scotica Butcher
- Eutreptia thiophila Skuja
- Eutreptia viridis Perty
