= Lawrence B. Slobodkin =

American ecologist (1928–2009)

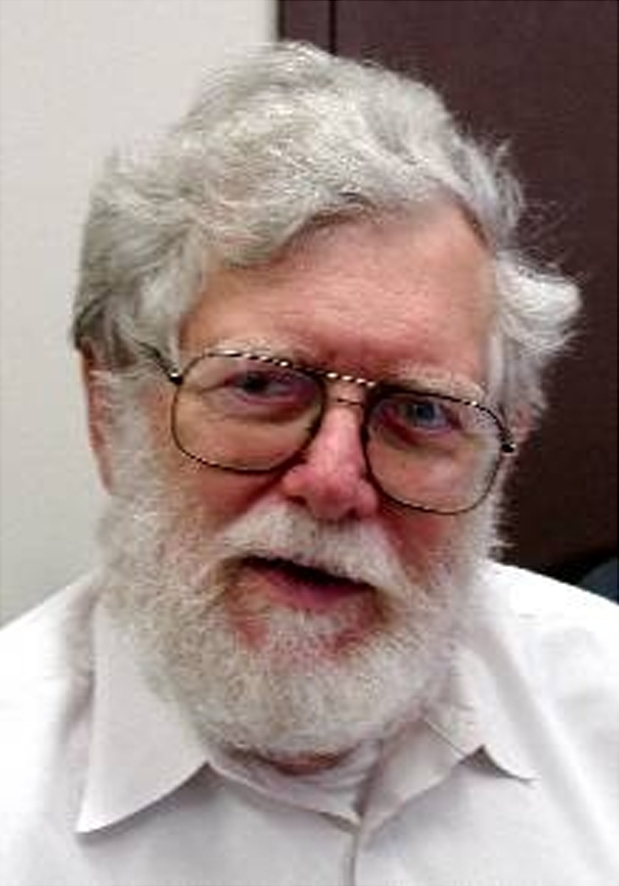
- Born: June 22, 1928; The Bronx
- Died: September 12, 2009 (aged 81); Old Field, New York
- Education: Yale University
- Scientific career
- Thesis: Population dynamics in Daphnia obtusa Kurz (1951)
- Doctoral advisor: G. Evelyn Hutchinson

Lawrence Basil Slobodkin (June 22, 1928 – September 12, 2009) was an American ecologist and Professor Emeritus at the Department of Ecology and Evolution, Stony Brook University, State University of New York. He was one of the leading pioneers of modern ecology. His innovative thinking and research, provocative teaching, and visionary leadership helped transform ecology into a modern science, with deep links to evolution.

== Biography ==
Slobodkin was born in 1928 in the Bronx, son of Louis Slobodkin and Florence (Gersh) Slobodkin. He was strongly influenced by the artistic, intellectual, cultural, and political milieu in which he developed; his mother was a writer and his father a noted sculptor who later became a well-known illustrator and writer who received the distinguished Caldecott Award for his watercolor illustrations of the children's book, Many Moons as well as biographies of the legendary revolutionaries Garibaldi and Lenin. While absorbing the lessons of art and literature, Slobodkin developed a guiding interest in biology, which he pursued first at Bethany College in West Virginia, and later under G. Evelyn Hutchinson at Yale University, where he received his doctorate in 1951 at the age of 23.

After completing his Ph.D., Slobodkin worked for two years for the United States Fish and Wildlife Service, where he developed a novel, theoretically informed hypothesis for the origin of red tides. He then joined the faculty of the University of Michigan in the Department of Zoology in 1953. In 1968 he moved to the State University of New York at Stony Brook.

Among his many other activities, Slobodkin held a key post as instructor and director of a marine ecology course, taught at the Marine Biological Laboratory at Woods Hole for many years in the 1960s, that served as a training ground for prominent ecologists. He was a visiting scholar at Hebrew University, Tel Aviv University, and Ben-Gurion University, as well as the Weizmann Institute, in Israel, twice a Guggenheim Fellow, twice a Fulbright Fellow, and a fellow of the Woodrow Wilson International Center for Scholars. He was honored by being elected as Fellow of the American Academy of Arts and Sciences and as Foreign Member of the Linnean Society of London. He was president of the American Society of Naturalists in 1985 and the Society for General Systems Research in 1969.

In 2005, Slobodkin, then Emeritus Professor of Ecology and Evolution at Stony Brook University, was named Eminent Ecologist by the Ecological Society of America.

== Work ==
Hutchinson, one of the most renowned ecologists of the 20th century, sought broad theoretical principles for ecology, and with his students helped to build a modern theoretical and mathematical framework on foundations that Volterra and Gause had already laid. Slobodkin played an important role in developing this framework via his research, teaching, and his very influential book, Growth and Regulation of Animal Populations, which served as a blueprint for generations of students of ecology at all levels. His doctoral research, a detailed study of the role of age structure in the growth of experimental populations of the microcrustacean Daphnia, epitomized his approach—a quantitative experimental test of a mathematical theory that was intended to apply broadly.

=== University of Michigan ===
At the University of Michigan Slobodkin pioneered the use of calorimetry as a tool for studying the "efficiency" of energy flow in ecosystems, a field in which his groundbreaking experimental work left a permanent legacy. He initiated a research program on brown and green hydra that explored such problems as the joint role of food and predation on limiting population growth, and the continuum of species interactions that lie between mutualism and parasitism.

Together with Nelson Hairston, Sr. and Frederick Smith, he wrote one of the most influential papers in the history of ecology, a four-page essay in The American Naturalist that is still required reading for many students in this field. Submitted under the title "Étude" (unacceptable to the editors), HSS (as the paper is often referred to, for Hairston, Smith, and Slobodkin) offered a simple but closely reasoned hypothesis for the regulation of populations at each trophic level in terrestrial ecosystems.

The "world is green", they reasoned, despite the insatiable appetite and enormous diversity of herbivores, because herbivore populations are held in check by their own natural enemies—predators, parasitoids, parasites, and pathogens. This hypothesis was both controversial and inspiring, and stimulated much later research on tri-trophic interactions, food web dynamics, and trophic cascades.

Larry Slobodkin enthusiastically shared his personal vision of science as a form of art. Thus, he asked a class of undergraduate students to look closely at the mounted skeleton of a cat he brought into the room with him - but to first look at it as an example of visual flow like a statue and only then as an example of adaptation. His quick and sophisticated wit, infusing both his conversation and teaching, was legendary. During a lecture at the University of Michigan, held in a basement-level auditorium where the podium was flanked by a door to the building's loading dock, he described the musical genius that blessed successive generations of the Bach family to illustrate principles of heredity. At that moment, a great clattering of garbage cans issued from the loading area. The noise had hardly stopped when Slobodkin quipped, “the janitors here prefer Tchaikovsky”.

=== State University of New York at Stony Brook ===
By the time he moved to the State University of New York at Stony Brook in 1968, Slobodkin was well-recognized in his field. There he established the Department of Ecology and Evolution.

While at Stony Brook, Slobodkin served as department chair for five years and directed its graduate program for seven years, in addition to serving as co-editor of The American Naturalist, and writing two more books, most recently A Citizen's Guide to Ecology. Many of the Ph.D. students he mentored first at the University of Michigan and later at Stony Brook went on to become well known ecologists, environmental scientists, and evolutionary biologists.

=== Research accomplishments ===
Slobodkin's research accomplishments were broad. He was an innovative thinker whose ideas provided the foundations for many topics that are still studied today. His research and writings were infused with erudition and wit that extended to his lectures and conversations. No one who knew him will forget his ability to express an idea, explanation, or his own experiences in the most incisive and humorous way. His ability to recall poetry, biblical references, arcane historical anecdotes, or Jewish jokes to fit any situation was legendary. He was vocally liberal and sensitive to the needs and feelings of immigrants and others who he thought might feel marginalized.

When asked to write a piece for the Ecological Society of America's series, What Do Ecologists Do?, after receiving the award, Slobodkin wrote, "My own advice on career development is that there are three career paths open and it is wise to excel at one of them: the first is to become an expert on some group of organisms that excites you…. Second, you [could] become very good at the most popular current techniques at the highest technical level you can imagine. In contrast, you can take the third, and most dangerous, path. You can strenuously avoid doing what everyone else is doing and search for new ideas and new tests for old ideas." Larry Slobodkin followed, with intensity, that third and most perilous path.

== Selected publications ==
Books

- 1980. Growth and Regulation of Animal Populations. 2nd enlarged edition. Dover Press.
- 1992. Simplicity and Complexity in Games of the Intellect. Cambridge: Harvard University Press.
- 1998. Beyond Ecological Awareness. Oxford Univ. Press.
- 2003. A Citizen's Guide to Ecology. Oxford Univ. Press.

Articles

- 1960. With N. Hairston and Frederick Smith. "Community structure, population control, and competition". In: The American Naturalist. Vol. 94, No. 879, Nov. - Dec., 1960. pp. 421–425
- 1967. With F. E. Smith and N. Hairston sr. "Regulation in terrestrial ecosystems and the implied balance of nature". In: The American Naturalist Vol 101, pp. 109-124.
- 1991. With P. Bossert. "The Coelenterates". Chapter 5 in: Ecology and Classification of Freshwater Invertebrates. J.H. Thorpe and A.P. Covich (eds). Academic Press. pp. 125–144.
- 1994. "The connection between single species and ecosystems". In: Water Quality and Stress Indicators: Linking Levels of Organization. D.W. Sutcliffe ed. Freshwater Biological Association, Ambleside, U.K. pp. 75–87
- 1994. "G. Evelyn Hutchinson, an appreciation". In: J. Animal Ecology. Vol 62: pp. 390–394.
- 1997. With Craig, S.F., G. A. Wray and C. H. Biermann, "The paradox of polyembryony: A review of the cases and a hypothesis for its evolution Evolutionary". In: Ecology, Vol 11, pp. 127–143.
