= Trophic cascade =

Ecosystem event

Side 1 in this diagram shows predators (wolves), primary consumers (deer), and flora existing at equilibrium. Side 2 shows a top-down trophic cascade, where a decrease in the population of wolves causes a rapid increase in the population of deer, which in turn puts a heavy strain on the local vegetation.

Trophic cascades are powerful indirect interactions that can control entire ecosystems, occurring when a trophic level in a food web is suppressed. For example, a top-down cascade will occur if predators are effective enough in predation to reduce the abundance, or alter the behavior of their prey, thereby releasing the next lower trophic level from predation (or herbivory if the intermediate trophic level is a herbivore).

The trophic cascade is an ecological concept which has stimulated new research in many areas of ecology. For example, it can be important for understanding the knock-on effects of removing top predators from food webs, as humans have done in many places through hunting and fishing.

A top-down cascade is a trophic cascade where the top consumer/predator controls the primary consumer population. In turn, the primary producer population thrives. The removal of the top predator can alter the food web dynamics. In this case, the primary consumers would overpopulate and exploit the primary producers. Eventually there would not be enough primary producers to sustain the consumer population. Top-down food web stability depends on competition and predation in the higher trophic levels. Invasive species can also alter this cascade by removing or becoming a top predator. This interaction may not always be negative. Studies have shown that certain invasive species have begun to shift cascades; and as a consequence, ecosystem degradation has been repaired.

For example, if the abundance of large piscivorous fish is increased in a lake, the abundance of their prey, smaller fish that eat zooplankton, should decrease. The resulting increase in zooplankton should, in turn, cause the biomass of its prey, phytoplankton, to decrease.

In a bottom-up cascade, the population of primary producers will always control the increase/decrease of the energy in the higher trophic levels. Primary producers are plants and phytoplankton that require photosynthesis. Although light is important, primary producer populations are altered by the amount of nutrients in the system. This food web relies on the availability and limitation of resources. All populations will experience growth if there is initially a large amount of nutrients.

In a subsidy cascade, species populations at one trophic level can be supplemented by external food. For example, native animals can forage on resources that don't originate in their same habitat, such as native predators eating livestock. This may increase their local abundances thereby affecting other species in the ecosystem and causing an ecological cascade. For example, Luskin et al. (2017) found that native animals living in protected primary rainforest in Malaysia found food subsidies in neighboring oil palm plantations. This subsidy allowed native animal populations to increase, which then triggered powerful secondary 'cascading' effects on forest tree community. Specifically, crop-raiding wild boar (Sus scrofa) built thousands of nests from the forest understory vegetation and this caused a 62% decline in forest tree sapling density over a 24-year study period. Such cross-boundary subsidy cascades may be widespread in both terrestrial and marine ecosystems and present significant conservation challenges.

These trophic interactions shape patterns of biodiversity globally. Humans and climate change have affected these cascades drastically. One example can be seen with sea otters (Enhydra lutris) on the Pacific coast of the United States of America. Over time, human interactions caused a removal of sea otters. One of their main prey, the Pacific purple sea urchin (Strongylocentrotus purpuratus) eventually began to overpopulate. The overpopulation caused increased predation of giant kelp (Macrocystis pyrifera). As a result, there was extreme deterioration of the kelp forests along the California coast. This is why it is important for countries to regulate marine and terrestrial ecosystems.

Predator-induced interactions could heavily influence the flux of atmospheric carbon if managed on a global scale. For example, a study was conducted to determine the cost of potential stored carbon in living kelp biomass in sea otter (Enhydra lutris) enhanced ecosystems. The study valued the potential storage between US$205 million and US$408 million on the European Carbon Exchange (2012).

== Origins and theory ==
Aldo Leopold is generally credited with first describing the mechanism of a trophic cascade, based on his observations of overgrazing of mountain slopes by deer after human extermination of wolves. Nelson Hairston, Frederick E. Smith and Lawrence B. Slobodkin are generally credited with introducing the concept into scientific discourse, although they did not use the term either. Hairston, Smith and Slobodkin argued that predators reduce the abundance of herbivores, allowing plants to flourish. This is often referred to as the green world hypothesis. The green world hypothesis is credited with bringing attention to the role of top-down forces (e.g. predation) and indirect effects in shaping ecological communities. The prevailing view of communities prior to Hairston, Smith and Slobodkin was trophodynamics, which attempted to explain the structure of communities using only bottom-up forces (e.g. resource limitation). Smith may have been inspired by the experiments of a Czech ecologist, Hrbáček, whom he met on a United States State Department cultural exchange. Hrbáček had shown that fish in artificial ponds reduced the abundance of zooplankton, leading to an increase in the abundance of phytoplankton.

Hairston, Smith and Slobodkin feuded that the ecological communities acted as food chains with three trophic levels. Subsequent models expanded the argument to food chains with more than or fewer than three trophic levels. Lauri Oksanen argued that the top trophic level in a food chain increases the abundance of producers in food chains with an odd number of trophic levels (such as in Hairston, Smith and Slobodkin's three trophic level model), but decreases the abundance of the producers in food chains with an even number of trophic levels. Additionally, he argued that the number of trophic levels in a food chain increases as the productivity of the ecosystem increases.

== Examples ==
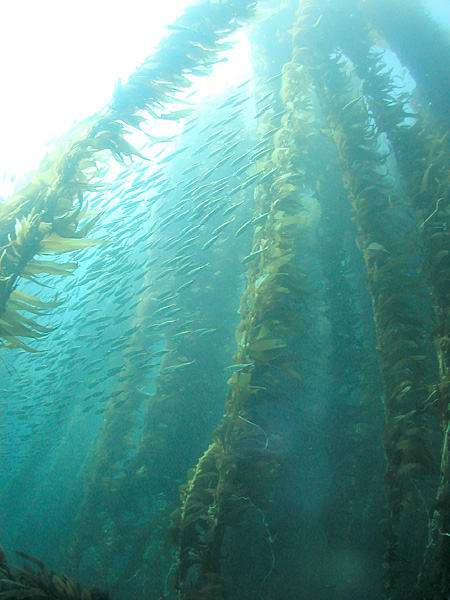
Healthy Pacific kelp forests, like this one at San Clemente Island of California's Channel Islands, have been shown to flourish when sea otters are present. When otters are absent, sea urchin populations can irrupt and severely degrade the kelp forest ecosystem.

Although Hairston, Smith and Slobodkin formulated their argument in terms of terrestrial food chains, the earliest empirical demonstrations of trophic cascades came from marine and, especially, aquatic ecosystems. Some of the most famous examples are:

- In North American lakes, piscivorous fish can dramatically reduce populations of zooplanktivorous fish; zooplanktivorous fish can dramatically alter freshwater zooplankton communities, and zooplankton grazing can in turn have large impacts on phytoplankton communities. Removal of piscivorous fish can change lake water from clear to green by allowing phytoplankton to flourish.
- In the Eel River, in Northern California, fish (steelhead and roach) consume fish larvae and predatory insects. These smaller predators prey on midge larvae, which feed on algae. Removal of the larger fish increases the abundance of algae.
- In Pacific kelp forests, sea otters feed on sea urchins. In areas where sea otters have been hunted to extinction, sea urchins increase in abundance and kelp populations are reduced.
- In popular media, the reintroduction of gray wolves (Canis lupus) to Yellowstone National Park is often celebrated as an example of a terrestrial trophic cascade in which the wolves "changed rivers" and "saved" the park. In reality, the Greater Yellowstone Ecosystem is too complex to serve as an example of a straightforward trophic cascade. The system is open, affected by conditions outside of the park, and it has been influenced by a range of human-made and natural, time-varying factors other than the reintroduction of wolves. Two dominant herbivores, American bison (Bison bison) and elk (Cervus canadensis), are predated on by five top predators, grizzly bears (Ursus arctos horribilis) and black bears (Ursus americanus), cougars (Puma concolor), wolves and human hunters in Montana.
- The ecosystem of Isle Royale Island is comparatively simple. Fifty years after moose (Alces alces) made their way to the island, wolves walked over winter ice in the late 1940s and began predating on the moose, keeping their number limited. In 1979 the wolf population crashed by 80% due to canine parvovirus, and the moose population exploded subsequently. After this event, the wolf population did not recover completely. Short term fluctuations in moose abundance were largely unrelated to wolves. Known factors include hot summers, both extremely cold winters and warm winters leading to severe tick infestations. Other factors remain unknown. Wolves were essential for keeping moose populations at a sustainable level over some time. The wolf population had dwindled down to two individuals, father and daughter, and the moose population was near 2000 individuals, when a project of relocating outside wolves to Isle Royale began in 2019. The long term moose-wolf study of Isle Royale continues in this new chapter of the moose-wolf saga.
- A "serendipitous natural experiment" took place in Banff National Park when the first wolf pack recolonized the Bow Valley in 1986. The valley includes areas of high and low human activity that corresponded to low and high wolf presence, respectively. The two areas showed differential rates of elk (Cervus canadensis) abundance, rates of wolf predation on elk, and a range of related environmental changes. High wolf activity increased aspen (Populus tremuloides) recruitment, willow (Salix spp.) production and beaver (Castor canadensis) lodge density. Riparian songbird density and diversity were also higher in high-wolf areas.
  A highly simplified sketch of the trophic cascade related to the reappearance of wolves. It illustrates events in the Bow Valley, Banff National Park. It does not capture complex systems such as Yellowstone National Park.

== Terrestrial trophic cascades ==
The fact that the earliest documented trophic cascades all occurred in lakes and streams led a scientist to speculate that fundamental differences between aquatic and terrestrial food webs made trophic cascades primarily an aquatic phenomenon. Trophic cascades were restricted to communities with relatively low species diversity, in which a small number of species could have overwhelming influence and the food web could operate as a linear food chain. Additionally, well documented trophic cascades at that point in time all occurred in food chains with algae as the primary producer. Trophic cascades, Strong argued, may only occur in communities with fast-growing producers which lack defenses against herbivory.

Subsequent research has documented trophic cascades in terrestrial ecosystems, including:

- In the coastal prairie of Northern California, yellow bush lupines are fed upon by a particularly destructive herbivore, the root-boring caterpillar of the lupine ghost moth Phymatopus californicus. Entomopathogenic nematodes kill the caterpillars, and can increase the survival and seed production of lupines.
- In Costa Rican rain forest, a clerid beetle specializes in eating ants. The ant Pheidole bicornis has a mutualistic association with Piper plants: the ant lives on the Piper and removes caterpillars and other insect herbivores. The clerid beetle, by reducing the abundance of ants, increases the leaf area removed from Piper plants by insect herbivores.

Critics pointed out that published terrestrial trophic cascades generally involved smaller subsets of the food web (often only a single plant species). This was quite different from aquatic trophic cascades, in which the biomass of producers as a whole were reduced when predators were removed. Additionally, most terrestrial trophic cascades did not demonstrate reduced plant biomass when predators were removed, but only increased plant damage from herbivores. It was unclear if such damage would actually result in reduced plant biomass or abundance. In 2002 a meta-analysis found trophic cascades to be generally weaker in terrestrial ecosystems, meaning that changes in predator biomass resulted in smaller changes in plant biomass. In contrast, a study published in 2009 demonstrated that multiple species of trees with highly varying autecologies are in fact heavily impacted by the loss of an apex predator.

Both the exterpation of gray wolves (Canis lupus) in Yellowstone National Park, complete by about 1930, and the reintroduction of them in 1995 and 1996 was followed by dramatic changes throughout trophic cascades. Freed from wolf predation, expanding elk herds reduced stands of aspen (Populus tremuloides), cottonwoods (Populus spp.), and willows (Salix spp.), and eliminated riparian plant and animal communities including beaver colonies. Ecological changes since the reintroduction of the wolves have been highly variable in time and space throughout Yellowstone. The following paragraphs focus on the Northern Range of the Greater Yellowstone Ecosystem. Some of the decreases in plants and animals listed above have been locally reversed after the wolf reintroduction. But the ecosystem as a whole has not completely reverted to its state before the exterpation of wolves.

The pre-1930 Northern Range ecosystem has been characterized as a "beaver-willow state." It changed into an "elk-grassland state" after the elimination of the wolves. Post wolf reintroduction, much of the Northern Range has not reverted to the beaver willow state but remains in the elk-grassland state. Such lack of return to a prior state is referred to as hysteresis. The principal mechanism of hysteresis in the Northern Range is creek and river incision. The elimination of beavers - and hence their dams - caused increased creek flow rates and erosion. Creek beds were lowered and with them the water table adjacent to the creek. These conditions are unfavorable for willow growth and hence beavers. A rare controlled in-situ experiment established that only the fencing out of herbivores combined with human-made "beaver" dams allowed willows to reestablish themselves. The mere fencing out of ungulates was insufficient.

Trophic cascade effects of direct wolf predation were hypothesized to be augmented or even surpassed by changes in elk behavior induced by the threatening presence of the wolves, the "landscape of fear scenario." More recent studies have highlighted how elk minimize predation risk by avoiding time of day-varying areas of high predator density. A complex analysis of 21 years of observations of wolves, elk and aspen in the Northern Range concluded that "trait-mediated indirect effects," changes in elk behavior triggered by the wolves, can be ignored in the understanding of the local trophic cascades.

The reintroduction and subsequent increasing numbers of Yellowstone wolves were paralleled by an increase in grizzly bears (Ursus arctos horribilis) which had been mismanaged by the National Park Service. Likewise, cougars (Puma concolor) became more abundant. The Northern Range elk herd seasonally migrates between the park and adjacent areas in Montana where they are subject to regulated human hunting. Further accounting for predation by black bears, five top preditors contribute to the trophic cascade in the Northern Range, human hunters, wolves, cougars and grizzly and black bears.

Trophic cascades also impact the biodiversity of ecosystems. In examples from Yellowstone National Park, scavengers, such as ravens (Corvus corax), bald eagles (Haliaeetus leucocephalus), grizzly bears (Ursus arctos horribilis) and others are subsidized by the carcasses of wolf kills. Willow habitat restored thanks to the reintroduced wolves has benefited song bird species. Bison (Bison bison) numbers in the northern range have been steadily increasing as elk numbers have declined, presumably due to a decrease in interspecific competition between the two species.

There are a number of other examples of trophic cascades involving large terrestrial mammals, including:

- In both Zion National Park and Yosemite National Park, the increase in human visitation during the first half of the 20th century was found to correspond to the decline of native cougar (Puma concolor) populations in at least part of their range. Soon after, native populations of mule deer (Odocoileus hemionus) erupted, subjecting resident communities of cottonwoods (Populus fremontii) in Zion and California black oak (Quercus kelloggii) in Yosemite to intensified browsing. This halted successful recruitment of these species except in refugia inaccessible to the deer. In Zion the suppression of cottonwoods increased stream erosion and decreased the diversity and abundance of amphibians, reptiles, butterflies, and wildflowers. In parts of the park where cougars were still common these negative impacts were not expressed and riparian communities were significantly healthier.
- In sub-Saharan Africa, the decline of lion (Panthera leo) and leopard (Panthera pardus) populations has led to a rising population of olive baboon (Papio anubis). This case of mesopredator release negatively impacted already declining ungulate populations and is one of the reasons for increased conflict between baboons and humans, as the primates raid crops and spread intestinal parasites.
- In the Australian states of New South Wales and South Australia, the presence or absence of dingoes (Canis lupus dingo) was found to be inversely related to the abundance of invasive red foxes (Vulpes vulpes). In other words, the foxes were most common where the dingoes were least common. Subsequently, populations of an endangered prey species, the dusky hopping mouse (Notomys fuscus) were also less abundant where dingoes were absent due to the foxes, which consume the mice, no longer being held in check by the top predator.

== Marine trophic cascades ==
In addition to the classic examples listed above, more recent examples of trophic cascades in marine ecosystems have been identified:

- An example of a cascade in a complex, open-ocean ecosystem occurred in the northwest Atlantic during the 1980s and 1990s. The removal of Atlantic cod (Gadus morhua) and other ground fishes by sustained overfishing resulted in increases in the abundance of the prey species for these ground fishes, particularly smaller forage fishes and invertebrates such as the northern snow crab (Chionoecetes opilio) and northern shrimp (Pandalus borealis). The increased abundance of these prey species altered the community of zooplankton that serve as food for smaller fishes and invertebrates as an indirect effect.
- A similar cascade, also involving the Atlantic cod, occurred in the Baltic Sea at the end of the 1980s. After a decline in Atlantic cod, the abundance of its main prey, the sprat (Sprattus sprattus), increased and the Baltic Sea ecosystem shifted from being dominated by cod into being dominated by sprat. The next level of trophic cascade was a decrease in the abundance of Pseudocalanus acuspes, a copepod which the sprat prey on.
- On Caribbean coral reefs, several species of angelfishes and parrotfishes eat species of sponges that lack chemical defenses. Removal of these sponge-eating fish species from reefs by fish-trapping and netting has resulted in a shift in the sponge community toward fast-growing sponge species that lack chemical defenses. These fast-growing sponge species are superior competitors for space, and overgrow and smother reef-building corals to a greater extent on overfished reefs.

== Criticisms ==
Although the existence of trophic cascades is not controversial, ecologists have long debated how ubiquitous they are. Hairston, Smith and Slobodkin argued that terrestrial ecosystems, as a rule, behave as a three trophic level trophic cascade, which provoked immediate controversy. Some of the criticisms, both of Hairston, Smith and Slobodkin's model and of Oksanen's later model, were:

- Plants possess numerous defenses against herbivory, and these defenses also contribute to reducing the impact of herbivores on plant populations.
- Herbivore populations may be limited by factors other than food or predation, such as nesting sites or available territory.
- For trophic cascades to be ubiquitous, communities must generally act as food chains, with discrete trophic levels. Most communities, however, have complex food webs. In real food webs, consumers often feed at multiple trophic levels (omnivory), organisms often change their diet as they grow larger, cannibalism occurs, and consumers are subsidized by inputs of resources from outside the local community, all of which blur the distinctions between trophic levels.

Antagonistically, this principle is sometimes called the "trophic trickle".

== See also ==
- Cascade effect (ecology)
- Ecological release
- Fishing down the food web
- Food web
- Lake ecology
- Mesopredator release hypothesis
- Population dynamics of fisheries
- Soil food web
- Stream ecology
- Organisms involved in water purification
