= Transgenic hydra =

Genetically-modified hydrozoan

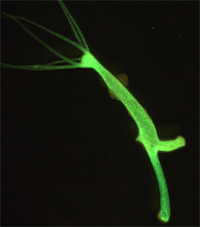
GFP-marked endodermal epithelial cells in Hydra

Cnidarians such as Hydra have become attractive model organisms to study the evolution of immunity. However, despite long-term efforts, stably transgenic animals could not be generated, severely limiting the functional analysis of genes. For analytical purposes, therefore, an important technical breakthrough in the field was the development of a transgenic procedure for generation of stably transgenic lines by embryo microinjection.

== Uses ==
Hydra polyps are small and transparent which makes it possible to trace single cells in vivo. In addition, transgenic Hydra provide a ready system for generating gain-of-function phenotypes. With the use of transgenes producing dominant-negative versions of proteins, one should be able to obtain loss-of-function phenotypes as well. Current technology allows generation of reporter constructs using promoters of various Hydra genes fused to fluorescent proteins.

Since transgenic Hydra lines have become an important tool to dissect molecular mechanisms of development, a “Hydra Transgenic Facility” has been established at Kiel University (Germany).
