= Hydramacin-1 =

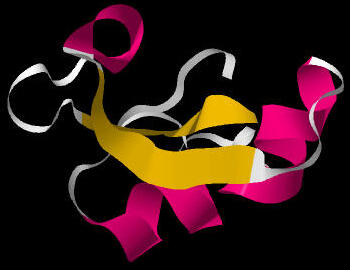
Structure of hydramacin-1

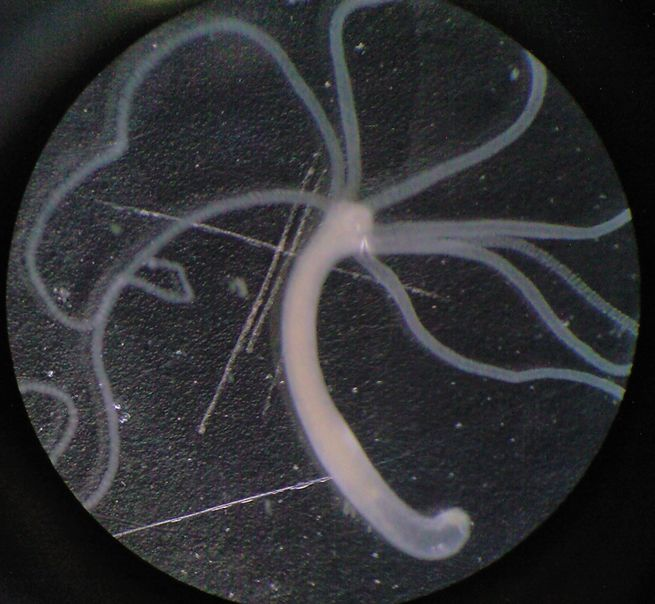
A hydra (size: several millimetres)

Hydramacin-1 is a type of antimicrobial protein. It was first isolated and reproduced in 2008 from cells of the freshwater hydroid Hydra. Only around 60 amino acids long, the protein is unique both in amino acid sequence and tertiary structure, prompting its classification in a new family of proteins, the macins. The protein's unusual structure is most likely a reason for the compound's potent antimicrobial qualities.

Antimicrobial tests determined that the protein has an antibacterial effect against both Gram-positive and Gram-negative bacteria. This potent antibacterial activity extended to known multi-resistant strains of pathogenic bacteria, such as those of Klebsiella oxytoca. Functionally, the protein causes bacterial cells to clump together and aggregate, changing the morphology of the bacterial aggregations it creates. This results in a disruption of the structure of the bacterial membrane.

Hydramacin-1 was first isolated from epithelial cells of the cnidarian Hydra, a small (almost-microscopic) freshwater animal related to corals, sea anemones and jellyfish. Like other members of the Phylum Cnidaria, Hydra possesses specialized defensive epithelial cells called cnidocytes that shoot toxic barbs into organisms they come in physical contact with. German researchers managed to isolate the gene that coded for the production of the protein from the Hydra genome in 2008. The gene was transferred and cloned in a plasmid (Pet32a) which was inserted in the bacteria Escherichia coli, a standard method of replicating a protein isolated from a much larger organism. The three-dimensional structure of the resulting protein was then determined by NMR spectroscopy and is now published online by the Protein Data Bank.

Hydramacin-1 is a single-chain protein composed of sixty amino acids. It is a unique combination of amino acids on the surface of the molecule that gives the protein its potent antimicrobial qualities. This specialized part of the protein tertiary structure, a positively charged belt in between two hydrophobic (and ionically inert) regions, has been suggested as the trigger for bacterial aggregation influence by the protein.

Hydramacin-1 is different from any other antibacterial currently known, except for two proteins found in leeches. The researchers propose placing hydramacin-1 and the proteins from the leech in a newly designated protein family called the macins. The proteins closest in structure to the macins are a superfamily of proteins derived from scorpion venom, dubbed the scorpion oxins.

== Bibliography ==
- Jung S, Dingley AJ, Augustin R, Anton-Erxleben F, Stanisak M, Gelhaus C, Gutsmann T, Hammer MU, Podschun R, Bonvin AM, Leippe M, Bosch TC, Grötzinger J (2009-01-16). "Hydramacin-1, Structure and Antibacterial Activity of a Protein from the Basal Metazoan Hydra". Journal of Biological Chemistry. 284 (3). The American Society for Biochemistry and Molecular Biology: 1896–1905. doi:10.1074/jbc.M804713200. PMID 19019828.
