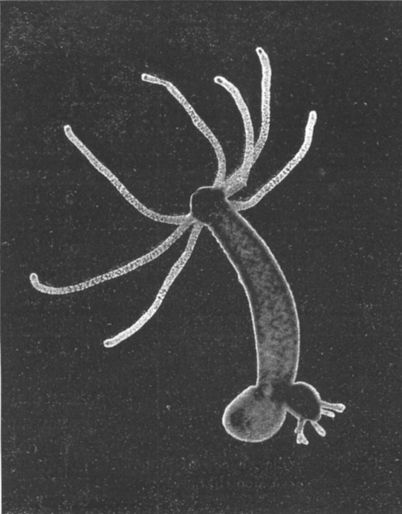
- Hydra budding

Scientific classification
- Kingdom: Animalia
- Phylum: Cnidaria
- Class: Hydrozoa
- Order: Anthoathecata
- Family: Hydridae; Dana, 1846
- Genus: Hydra; Linnaeus, 1758

Species
- List: * Hydra baikalensis Swarczewsky, 1923; * Hydra beijingensis Fan, 2003; * Hydra canadensis Rowan, 1930; * Hydra cauliculata Hyman, 1938; * Hydra circumcincta Schulze, 1914; * Hydra daqingensis Fan, 2000; * Hydra ethiopiae Hickson, 1930; * Hydra hadleyi (Forrest, 1959); * Hydra harbinensis Fan & Shi, 2003; * Hydra hymanae Hadley & Forrest, 1949; * Hydra iheringi Cordero, 1939; * Hydra intaba Ewer, 1948; * Hydra intermedia De Carvalho Wolle, 1978; * Hydra japonica Itô, 1947; * Hydra javanica Schulze, 1929; * Hydra liriosoma Campbell, 1987; * Hydra madagascariensis Campbell, 1999; * Hydra magellanica Schulze, 1927; * Hydra mariana Cox & Young, 1973; * Hydra minima Forrest, 1963; * Hydra mohensis Fan & Shi, 1999; * Hydra oligactis Pallas, 1766; * Hydra oregona Griffin & Peters, 1939; * Hydra oxycnida Schulze, 1914; * Hydra paludicola Itô, 1947; * Hydra paranensis Cernosvitov, 1935; * Hydra parva Itô, 1947; * Hydra plagiodesmica Dioni, 1968; * Hydra polymorpha Chen & Wang, 2008; * Hydra robusta (Itô, 1947); * Hydra rutgersensis Forrest, 1963; * Hydra salmacidis Lang da Silveira et al., 1997; * Hydra sinensis Wang et al., 2009; * Hydra thomseni Cordero, 1941; * Hydra umfula Ewer, 1948; * Hydra utahensis Hyman, 1931; * Hydra viridissima Pallas, 1766; * Hydra vulgaris Pallas, 1766; * Hydra zeylandica Burt, 1929; * Hydra zhujiangensis Liu & Wang, 2010

Synonyms
- Chlorohydra

= Hydra (genus) =

Genus of cnidarians

Hydra (/ˈhaɪdrə/ HY-drə) is a genus of small freshwater hydrozoans in the phylum Cnidaria. They are solitary, carnivorous jellyfish-like animals, native to the temperate and tropical regions. The genus was named by Linnaeus in 1758 after the Hydra, the mythical many-headed beast that was defeated by Heracles, as when the animal has a part severed, it will regenerate much like the mythical Hydra's heads. Biologists are especially interested in Hydra because of their regenerative ability; they do not appear to die of old age, or to age at all.

== Habitat ==
Hydras are often found in freshwater bodies, but some Hydras are found in open water. They live attached to submerged rocks using a sticky secretion from their base. The genus Hydra occurs on all continents except for Antarctica and the Oceanic islands, though Hydras occur mainly in mesotrophic to eutrophic habitats.

== Morphology ==
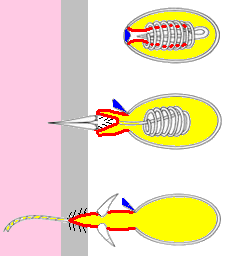
Schematic drawing of a discharging nematocyst

Hydra has a tubular, radially symmetric body up to 10 mm (0.39 in) long when extended, secured by a simple adhesive foot known as the basal disc. Gland cells in the basal disc secrete a sticky fluid that accounts for its adhesive properties. Hydra has a body wall made up of the ectoderm and the endoderm, which are separated by an extracellular matrix called the mesoglea.

At the free end of the body is a mouth opening surrounded by mobile tentacles. Each tentacle, or cnida (plural: cnidae), is clad with highly specialised stinging cells called cnidocytes. Cnidocytes contain specialized structures called nematocysts, which look like miniature light bulbs with a coiled thread inside. The nematocysts are housed within a single epithelial cell together with a sensory and nerve cell. At the narrow outer edge of the cnidocyte is a short trigger hair called a cnidocil. Upon contact with prey, the contents of the nematocyst are explosively discharged due to hydrostatic pressure (the osmotic pressure exceeds a critical threshold), firing a dart-like thread containing neurotoxins into whatever triggered the release. This can paralyze the prey, especially if many hundreds of nematocysts are fired.

The number of tentacles in Hydra depends on species, age, size and environmental conditions. In general, hydras can have from four to eight tentacles. In the species Hydra viridissima, the number varies from four to eleven. Each individual can change the number of tentacles it has, usually gaining or losing a tentacle over a matter of days, and possibly reversing the change as well.

In Hydra, different types of nematocysts are distinguished: the desmonemes for prey attachment; the isorhizas with spines in the interior of the nematocyst capsule and the spineless atrichous isorhizas; and the large stenoteles, with a prominent stylet apparatus at the tubule base employed for piercing cuticle structures.

Hydra has two main body layers, which makes it diploblastic. The layers are separated by mesoglea, a gel-like substance. The outer layer is the epidermis, and the inner layer is called the gastrodermis, because it lines the stomach. The cells making up these two body layers are relatively simple. Hydramacin is a bactericide recently discovered in Hydra; it protects the outer layer against infection. A single Hydra is composed of 50,000 to 100,000 cells which consist of three specific stem cell populations that create many different cell types. These stem cells continually renew themselves in the body column. Hydras have two significant structures on their body: the "head" and the "foot". When a Hydra is cut in half, each half regenerates and forms into a small Hydra; the "head" regenerates a "foot" and the "foot" regenerates a "head". If the Hydra is sliced into many segments then the middle slices form both a "head" and a "foot".

Respiration and excretion occur by diffusion throughout the surface of the epidermis, while larger excreta are discharged through the mouth by a quick radial contraction of the body column.

== Nervous system ==
The nervous system of Hydra is a nerve net, composed of a few hundred to a few thousand neurons, which is structurally simple compared to more derived animal nervous systems. Hydra does not have a recognizable brain or true muscles. Nerve nets connect sensory photoreceptors and touch-sensitive nerve cells located in the body wall and tentacles.

The structure of the nerve net has two levels:

- level 1 – sensory cells or internal cells; and
- level 2 – interconnected ganglion cells connected via synapse to epithelial or motor cells.

Some have only two sheets of neurons.

It also has been described that there are three major networks extending throughout Hydra's entire body. They are activated selectively during longitudinal contractions, elongations in response to light, and radial contractions; the additional network near the hypostome, the dome-shaped jut surrounding the mouth aperture, is activated during nodding (the gentle swaying of the hypostome and its tentacles to one side).

== Motion and locomotion ==
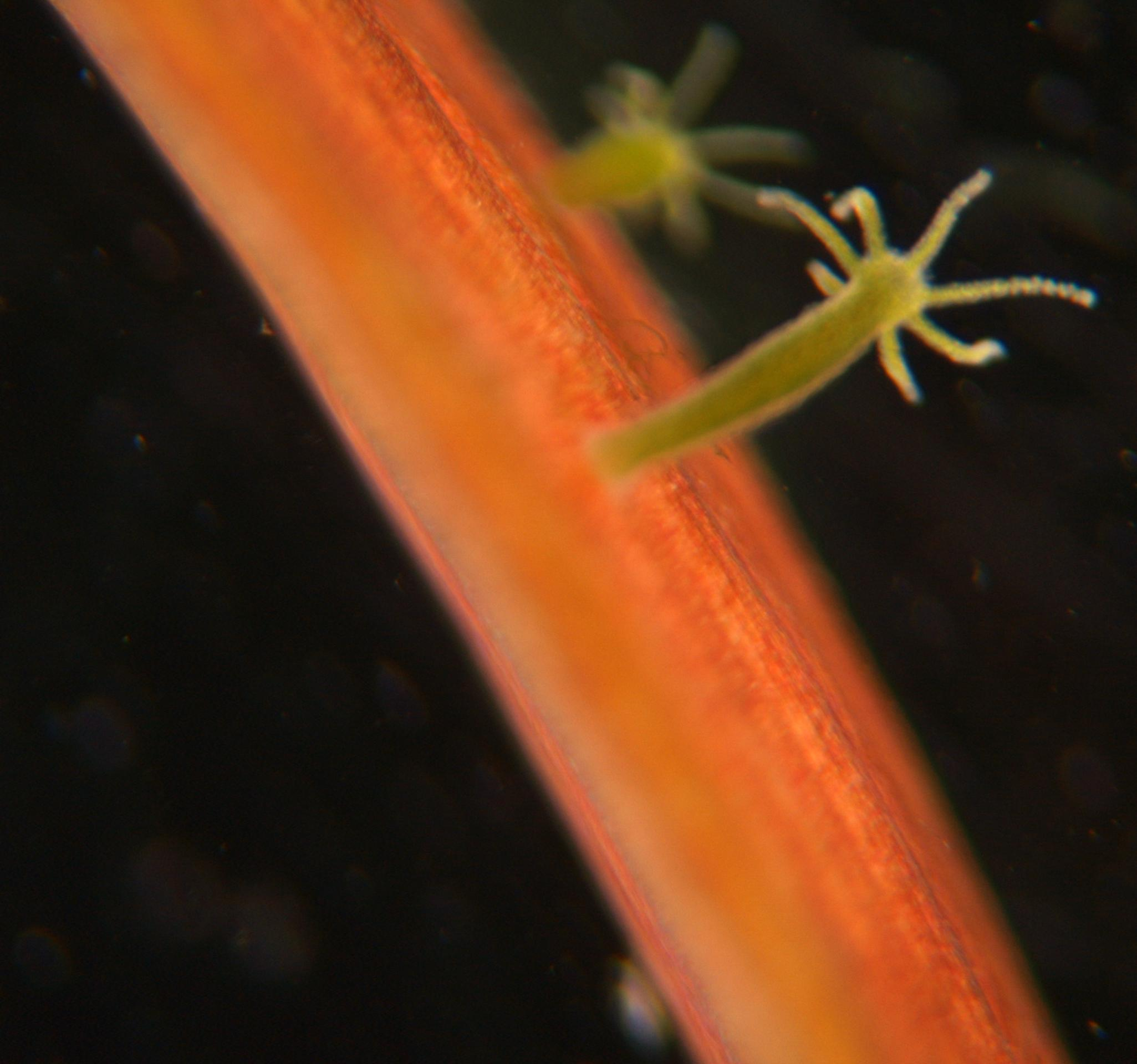
Hydra attached to a substrate

If Hydra are alarmed or attacked, the tentacles can be retracted to small buds, and the body column itself can be retracted to a small gelatinous sphere. Hydra generally react in the same way regardless of the direction of the stimulus, and this may be due to the simplicity of the nerve nets.

Hydra are generally sedentary or sessile, but do occasionally move quite readily, especially when hunting. They have two distinct methods for moving: looping and somersaulting. They do this by bending over and attaching themselves to the substrate with the mouth and tentacles and then relocate the foot, which provides the usual attachment; this process is called looping. In somersaulting, the body then bends over and makes a new place of attachment with the foot. By this process of looping or somersaulting, a Hydra can move several inches (c. 100 mm) in a day. Hydra may also move by amoeboid motion of their bases or by detaching from the substrate and floating away in the current.

A dark-habituated Hydra that is exposed to light will respond by elongating its body towards it, bending its hypostome-tentacle junction, and eventually somersaulting towards the light source.

== Reproduction and life cycle ==
Most Hydras can reproduce sexually under certain conditions, though they typically choose to reproduce asexually instead. Unlike many members of the Hydrozoa, which alternate between the polyp form and the medusa form (the life stage where sexual reproduction occurs), Hydra never progress beyond the polyp phase in their life cycle. Instead, when food is plentiful, many Hydra opt to reproduce asexually by budding. A section of the body wall and an extension of the digestive cavity develop, creating a bud. The buds grow into miniature adults and break away when mature. When a Hydra is well fed, a new bud can form every two days.

When conditions are harsh, often before winter or in poor feeding conditions, sexual reproduction then occurs in some Hydra. Either the ovaries or testes develop from interstitial cells of the epidermis, resulting in swellings in the body wall. The testes release free-swimming gametes into the water, and these can fertilize the egg in the ovary of another individual. The fertilized eggs secrete a tough outer coating, and, as the adult dies (due to starvation or cold), these resting eggs fall to the bottom of the lake or pond to await better conditions, whereupon they hatch into nymph Hydra. The male Hydra is typically smaller in size and bears 1 to 8 conical testes, while the female is larger and has 1 to 2 ovaries. Some Hydra species, like Hydra circumcincta and Hydra viridissima, are hermaphrodites and may produce both testes and ovaries at the same time.

== Feeding ==
The mouth of the Hydra is surrounded by tentacles. When feeding, Hydra extend their body to maximum length and then slowly extend their tentacles. The tentacles of Hydra are extensible and can be four to five times the length of the body. To search for prey, Hydra extends its tentacles and slowly maneuvers them, waiting for contact. Upon contact with a prey, the stenoteles discharges neurotoxins; the desmonemes on the tentacle (nematocysts) also discharge threads that coil around the prey. Most of the tentacles join in the attack within 30 seconds. Within two minutes, the tentacles move the prey into the open mouth aperture. Within ten minutes, the prey is engulfed and digestion commences. A Hydra, with a column length of approximately 3–30 mm when extended and a width of about 1 mm, can stretch its body wall to digest prey more than twice its size. After 2–3 days, the indigestible remains will be discharged through the mouth aperture via contractions.

Hydra's budding: 1. Non-reproducing; 2. Creating a bud; 3. Daughter growing out; 4. Beginning to cleave; 5. Daughter broken off; 6. Daughter clone of parent

The Hydra's mouth is not permanent: When the Hydra closes its mouth, the cells surrounding the open mouth fuse together. These joints are then broken when the Hydra feeds again.

=== Measuring the feeding response ===
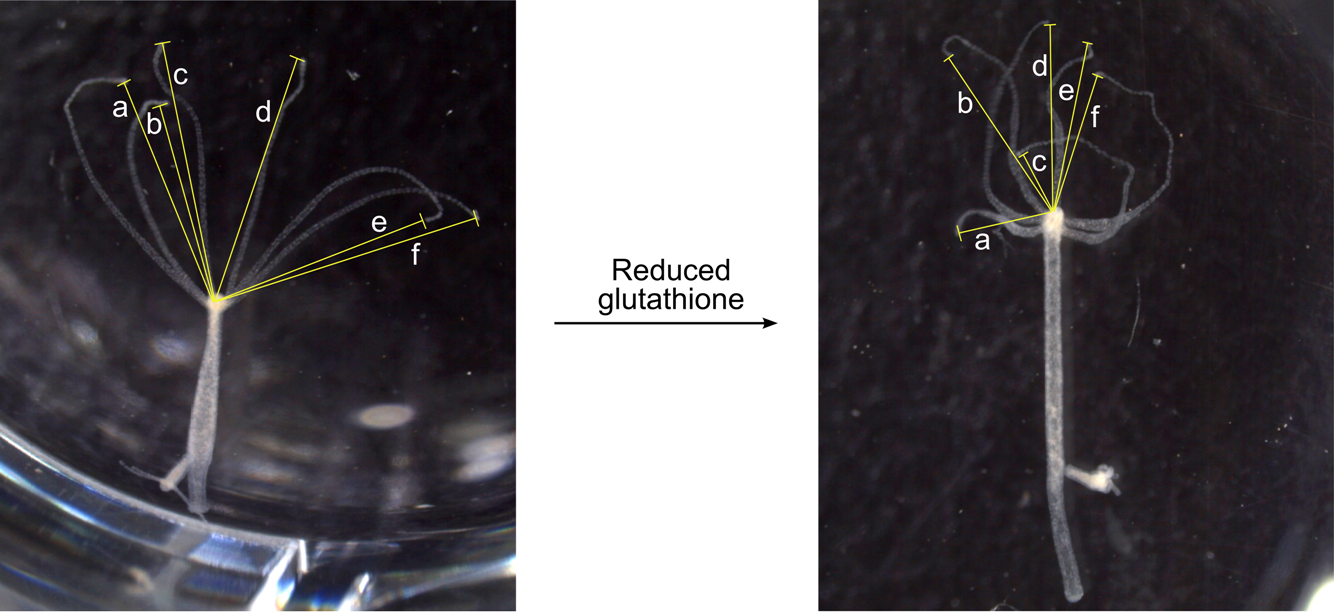
Reduction of glutathione causes reduction in the tentacle spread in Hydra.

The feeding response in Hydra is induced by glutathione (specifically in the reduced state as GSH) released from damaged tissue of injured prey. There are several methods conventionally used for quantification of the feeding response. In some, the duration for which the mouth remains open is measured. Other methods rely on counting the number of Hydra among a small population showing the feeding response after addition of glutathione. Recently, an assay for measuring the feeding response in Hydra has been developed. In this method, the linear two-dimensional distance between the tip of the tentacle and the mouth of Hydra was shown to be a direct measure of the extent of the feeding response. This method has been validated using a starvation model, as starvation is known to cause enhancement of the Hydra feeding response.

== Ecology ==
=== Food sources ===
Hydra, as a carnivorous cnidarian, mainly feeds on small aquatic invertebrates. Hydra can also eat worms, young insects, larval mollusks, bluegill larvae, tiny crustaceans (e.g., Daphnia, Cyclops, ostracods, cladocerans, and copepods), and algaes (e.g., Cocconeis placentula, Cyclotella meneghineana, and Navicula zanoni).

Some species of Hydra exist in a mutual relationship with various types of unicellular algae. The algae are protected from predators by Hydra; in return, photosynthetic products from the algae are beneficial as a food source to Hydra and even help to maintain the Hydra microbiome. There is an entire clade of "green hydra" where the species can stably maintain a population of Chlorella internally, with the main representative being Hydra viridissima. There are at least 4 species in this clade. The other species are called "brown hydra". There exists an immature symbiotic relationship between some strains of Hydra vulgaris and Chlorococcum.

=== Predators ===
The species Hydra oligactis is preyed upon by the flatworm Microstomum lineare. Some Coleps sp. have also been observed to attack Hydra polyps in groups, with them attacking Hydras' tentacles first before consuming the entire polyps. Some other common predators include carnivorous or omnivorous fishes such as guppies, bettas, and gouramis.

== Tissue regeneration ==
Hydras undergo morphallaxis (tissue regeneration) when injured or severed. Typically, Hydras reproduce by just budding off a whole new individual; the bud occurs around two-thirds of the way down the body axis. When a Hydra is cut in half, each half regenerates and forms into a small Hydra; the "head" regenerates a "foot" and the "foot" regenerates a "head". This regeneration occurs without cell division. If the Hydra is sliced into many segments, the middle slices form both a "head" and a "foot". The polarity of the regeneration is explained by two pairs of positional value gradients. There is both a head and foot activation and inhibition gradient. The head activation and inhibition works in an opposite direction of the pair of foot gradients. The evidence for these gradients was shown in the early 1900s with grafting experiments. The inhibitors for both gradients have shown to be important to block the bud formation. The location where the bud forms is where the gradients are low for both the head and foot.

Hydras are capable of regenerating from pieces of tissue from the body and additionally after tissue dissociation from reaggregates. This process takes place not only in the pieces of tissue excised from the body column, but also from re-aggregates of dissociated single cells. It was found that in these aggregates, cells initially distributed randomly undergo sorting and form two epithelial cell layers, in which the endodermal epithelial cells play more active roles in the process. Active mobility of these endodermal epithelial cells forms two layers in both the re-aggregate and the re-generating tip of the excised tissue. As these two layers are established, a patterning process takes place to form heads and feet.

== Non-senescence ==
Daniel Martinez claimed in an article in Experimental Gerontology in 1998 that Hydra are biologically immortal. This publication has been widely cited as evidence that Hydra do not senesce (i.e., do not age), and that they are proof of the existence of non-senescing organisms generally.

The controversial unlimited lifespan of Hydra has attracted much attention from scientists. In 2010, Preston Estep published (also in Experimental Gerontology) a letter to the editor arguing that the Martinez data refutes the hypothesis that Hydra do not senesce. Other research from the 2010s appears to confirm Martinez's study by finding Hydra stem cells have a capacity for indefinite self-renewal. The transcription factor "forkhead box O" (FoxO) has been identified as a critical driver of the continuous self-renewal of Hydra. In experiments, a drastically reduced population growth resulted from FoxO downregulation.

In bilaterally symmetrical organisms (Bilateria), the transcription factor FoxO affects stress response, lifespan, and increase in stem cells. If this transcription factor is knocked down in bilaterian model organisms, such as fruit flies and nematodes, their lifespan is significantly decreased. In experiments on H. vulgaris (a radially symmetrical member of phylum Cnidaria), when FoxO levels were decreased, there was a negative effect on many key features of the Hydra, but no death was observed, thus it is believed other factors may contribute to the apparent lack of aging in these creatures.

== DNA repair ==
Hydras are capable of two types of DNA repair: nucleotide excision repair and base excision repair. The repair pathways facilitate DNA replication by removing DNA damage. Their identification in Hydra was based, in part, on the presence in its genome of genes homologous to ones present in other genetically well studied species playing key roles in these DNA repair pathways.

== Genomics ==
Hydra has more than 20,000 genes, along with a set of six actinoporin-like toxin genes found in its nematocysts. An ortholog comparison analysis done in 2013 demonstrated that Hydra share a minimum of 6,071 genes with humans. Hydra is becoming an increasingly better model system as more genetic approaches become available. Transgenic hydra have become attractive model organisms to study the evolution of immunity. A draft of the genome of Hydra magnipapillata was reported in 2010.

The genus Hydra is divided into two clades, the green hydras (e.g. H. viridissima) and the brown hydras (e.g. H. oligactis, H. vulgaris). The genomes of cnidarians are usually less than 500 Mb (megabases) in size, as in the green hydras, which has a genome size of approximately 300 Mb. In contrast, the genomes of brown hydras are approximately 1 Gb in size. This is because the brown hydra genome is the result of an expansion event involving LINEs, a type of transposable elements, in particular, a single family of the CR1 class. This expansion is unique to this subgroup of the genus Hydra and is absent in the green hydra, which has a repeating landscape similar to other cnidarians. These genome characteristics make Hydra attractive for studies of transposon-driven speciations and genome expansions.

Due to the simplicity of their life cycle when compared to other hydrozoans, Hydras have lost many genes that correspond to cell types or metabolic pathways of which the ancestral function is still unknown. The ancestral Toll/TLR pathway, for example, is present in Anthozoa, but the key upstream receptor component of it is missing or has diverged in Hydra. The genus Hydra is missing some genes associated with larvae development, fluorescent proteins, and circadian rhythms that are normally found in the sea anemone genome. The genes eve and emx are absent in Hydra, even though they are present in Nematostella and hydrozoans. These genes are expressed during the larvae development. These losses in gene expression are thought to be signs of a substantial secondary gene loss during evolution.

Hydra genome shows a preference towards proximal promoters. Thanks to this feature, many reporter cell lines have been created with regions around 500 to 2000 bases upstream of the gene of interest. Its cis-regulatory elements (CRE) are mostly located less than 2000 base pairs upstream from the closest transcription initiation site, but there are CREs located further away.

Its chromatin has a Rabl configuration. There are interactions between the centromeres of different chromosomes and the centromeres and telomeres of the same chromosome. It presents a great number of intercentromeric interactions when compared to other cnidarians, probably due to the loss of multiple subunits of condensin II. It is organized in domains that span dozens to hundreds of megabases, containing epigenetically co-regulated genes and flanked by boundaries located within heterochromatin.

== Transcriptomics ==
Different Hydra cell types express gene families of different evolutionary ages. Progenitor cells (stem cells, neuron and nematocyst precursors, and germ cells) express genes from families that predate metazoans. Among differentiated cells some express genes from families that date from the base of metazoans, like gland and neuronal cells, and others express genes from newer families, originating from the base of cnidaria or medusozoa, like nematocysts. Interstitial cells contain translation factors with a function that has been conserved for at least 400 million years.

== In popular culture ==
In the video game Terra Invicta, the aliens attacking the Earth come to be nicknamed "hydras" due to their similarity to the real-world animal. They share a number of common traits, such as tentacles around their mouth, tissue regeneration, and lacking senescence.

== See also ==
- Lernaean Hydra, a Greek mythological aquatic creature after which the genus is named
- Turritopsis dohrnii, another cnidarian (a jellyfish) that scientists believe to be immortal
