= Nelson Hairston =

American ecologist (1917–2008)

Nelson Hairston Sr. (16 October 1917 – 31 July 2008) was an American ecologist. Hairston is well known for his work in ecology and human disease. In the field of ecology he is famous for championing the idea of the trophic cascade, on which he published the provocative “Green World Hypothesis” with colleagues Frederick E. Smith and Lawrence B. Slobodkin. Nelson was also deeply interested in the factors that control human disease and was an adviser to the World Health Organization for many years.

== Early life ==
Nelson was born on October 16, 1917, in the Cooleemee area of Davie County, North Carolina. He was the second of two boys to Margaret George Hairston (1885-1963) and Peter Hairston (1871-1943). The Hairstons owned plantations all around Henry County, Virginia, Pittsylvania County, Virginia, Franklin County, Virginia, North Carolina, and Lowndes County, Mississippi. He was born on the Cooleemee Plantation, which was built by his grandfather, Peter Wilson Hairston (1819-1886).

== Early career ==
Nelson was interested in ecology from an early age. He graduated from the department of Zoology at the University of North Carolina with both a BS and MS. Hairston continued his studies at Northwestern University under the supervision of Dr. Orlando Park. His PhD was interrupted by World War II, where he served his country by helping treat and prevent the transmission of malaria in the South Pacific. After the war, Nelson returned to his PhD, which was on the distribution of salamanders in Appalachia. These early experiences with studying the ecology of salamanders and the treatment of disease began his lifelong interest in the ecology and prevention of disease.

== Academic work ==
=== Professor of Zoology ===
Hairston spent most of his career (27 years) as a professor of Zoology at the University of Michigan and director of their Museum of Zoology. During this time Nelson helped to make the University of Michigan one of the United States preeminent graduate programs in ecology. Afterwards he spent 12 years as a professor at the University of North Carolina as a Kenan Professor of Biology, where he advised students including evolutionary biologist Richard Lenski. Throughout Hairston’s career, he focused most of his work on the role trophic interactions, such as the trophic cascade, has on determining the species composition of communities of co-existing organisms.

=== Adviser to the UN’s World Health Organization ===
Hairston’s work on human disease was equally controversial. Nelson, along with a handful of other colleagues, championed the idea that disease was an ecological problem that could be solved by understanding the ecology of germs and how we interact with our ecosystems. This once controversial view is now well accepted by epidemiologists and others in the health profession. Hairston’s views on disease treatment and management were applied through the UN’s World Health Organization, where he served as an adviser on schistosomiasis in countries throughout Europe, the Middle East, Africa, and the South Pacific.

== Retirement ==
Hairston retired at the age of 69. Despite retiring, Hairston remained an active and engaged scientist. Post retirement he published three books, including, “Ecological Experiments”, which was translated into several different languages. During this time Hairston was also nominated to the American Academy of Arts and Sciences and was given the Eminent Ecologist Award by the Ecological Society of America. His son Nelson Hairston Jr is professor of Environmental Science at Cornell University.
