= Morphallaxis =

Category of cell regeneration

Morphallaxis is the regeneration of specific tissue in a variety of organisms due to loss or death of the existing tissue. The word comes from the Greek allazein, (αλλάζειν) which means to change.

The classical example of morphallaxis is that of the Cnidarian hydra, where when the animal is severed in two (by actively cutting it with, for example, a surgical knife) the remaining severed sections form two fully functional and independent hydra. The notable feature of morphallaxis is that a large majority of regenerated tissue comes from already-present tissue in the organism. That is, the one severed section of the hydra forms into a smaller version of the original hydra, approximately the same size as the severed section. Hence, there is an "exchange" of tissue.

Morphallaxis is often contrasted with epimorphosis, which is characterized by a much greater relative degree of cellular proliferation. Although cellular differentiation is active in both processes, in morphallaxis the majority of the regeneration comes from reorganization or exchange, while in epimorphosis the majority of the regeneration comes from cellular differentiation. Thus, the two may be distinguished as a measure of degree. Epimorphosis is the regeneration of a part of an organism by proliferation at the cut surface. For example, in Planaria neoblasts help in regeneration.

== History ==
The word comes from the Greek allazein, which means to exchange. The biological process was first discovered in hydra by Abraham Trembley, who was considered the father of environmental zoology. Abraham Trembley was doing research on a sample of pond water and examined the lifestyle of hydra. He couldn’t decide if they belonged to the animal or plant kingdom, so he cut them in half and planned to see whether they died, like animals would, or re-patterned, as plants would. Even though the halves and smaller pieces gave rise to new individuals, he still believed the Hydra to be an animal, since all its features, like movements and feeding behavior, matched with animals. Trembley came to the conclusion that some animals have the ability to regenerate.

The process and mechanism of planarian regeneration was eventually renamed to 'Morphallaxis' by Thomas Hunt Morgan, the father of experimental genetics.

== Regeneration in Cnidarian hydras ==
Hydras are a group of freshwater Cnidarians that are about 0.5 cm long. A hydra has a short, tubular shaped body. Hydras have a head that consists of a hypostome region and a foot that consists of a basal disc. The head portion of the hydra contains the mouth and tentacles, which allows for the catching and eating of food. The foot portion of the hydra contains the basal disc, which allows for the hydra to stick to rocks and other elements.

When a hydra is cut in half, the head portion can regenerate and form a new foot with the basal disc, and the foot portion can regenerate and form a new head with the hypostome region. If a hydra was severed into smaller pieces, the middle pieces would still form a head and foot at the appropriate regions of the hydra. This results in a smaller hydra that was regenerated by morphallaxis and occurs without cellular division.

== Mechanism ==
The mechanism involved uses regenerative tissue remodeling. This allows new tissue to regenerate, as well as causes organs in the body to redevelop into different proportions.

Hydras contain a series of gradients that controls the formation of the correct head and foot regeneration. The head gradient permits the head to only form in one place, and the foot gradient permits the basal disc to only form in another place. These gradients are driven by the polarity in the hydra. The hypostome in the head region inhibits the formation of another hypostome. This explains why two heads will not form on one hydra.

== Types of regeneration ==
The four types of regeneration are epimorphosis, stem cell–mediated regeneration, morphallaxis, and compensatory regeneration (compensatory hyperplasia).

Epimorphosis occurs when other adult cells in a damaged tissue undergo dedifferentiation and then divide to form an undifferentiated mass of tissue, this new mass encompasses the mass of missing tissue and then re-differentiate to form the replacement tissue. An example of this type of regeneration is salamander limb regeneration.

A second type is morphallaxis, where severed tissue will regrow into a smaller but similar version of the "parent" tissue or organism. The severed tissue does this by repatterning itself through the use of gradients (such as the beta-catenin gradient) so cells can reaggregate and reform the "parent" form. An example of this is a Cnidarian hydra.

A third type is stem cell mediated regeneration, where stem cells permit the regrowth of tissue which has been damaged or lost. A classic example being the continuous replacement of blood cells.

A fourth type of regeneration is compensatory regeneration or Compensatory hyperplasia, where existing tissue will proliferate and regenerate damaged or missing tissue without the use of stem cells or previous adult cells undergoing dedifferentiation before dividing. As such, no mass of undifferentiated tissue forms and each new cell produced is similar to the previous cells. This type of regeneration is characteristic in certain mammalian organs such as the liver.
