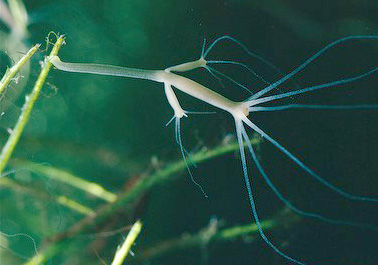

Scientific classification
- Kingdom: Animalia
- Phylum: Cnidaria
- Class: Hydrozoa
- Order: Anthoathecata
- Family: Hydridae
- Genus: Hydra
- Species: H. oligactis

Binomial name
- Hydra oligactis Pallas, 1766

Synonyms
- Pelmatohydra oligactis (Pallas, 1766); Hydra fusca Linnaeus, 1767; Hydra rhaetica Asper, 1879; Hydra roeselii Haacke, 1879; Hydra rhistica Asper, 1880; Hydra monoecia Downing, 1900

= Hydra oligactis =

Species of hydrozoan

Hydra oligactis, also known as the brown hydra, is a species of hydra found widely dispersed in the northern temperate zone and is also present in the Southern Hemisphere. It is a common organism found in still waters from early Spring to late Autumn.

"Brown hydra" alternatively refers to a clade of the genus Hydra, defined in opposition to the clade of "green hydras".

== Habitat ==
It is commonly found attached to the stems of water plants, the undersides of leaves, submerged twigs and on the surface of stones. When disturbed it retracts to a small brown blob which is easily overlooked. Gently sweeping through a clean weedy pond and allowing the collected water and leaves to stand in a jar will often reveal Hydra emerging after only a few minutes.

== Ecology ==
When in feeding mode, the fully extended tentacles are very long and may exceed 1 inch (25 mm) in length. In this condition the tentacles are very difficult to see with the naked eye and are often only revealed when a prey animal such as Daphnia is caught. The relative length of the tentacles compared to the body, the asymmetrical emergence of tentacles during budding, and the examination of cnidocytes on the tentacles serves to differentiate it from any other brown Hydra of cool temperate waters.

Hydra oligactis is preyed upon by the flatworm Microstomum lineare, which incorporates Hydra stenoteles into its own epidermis.
