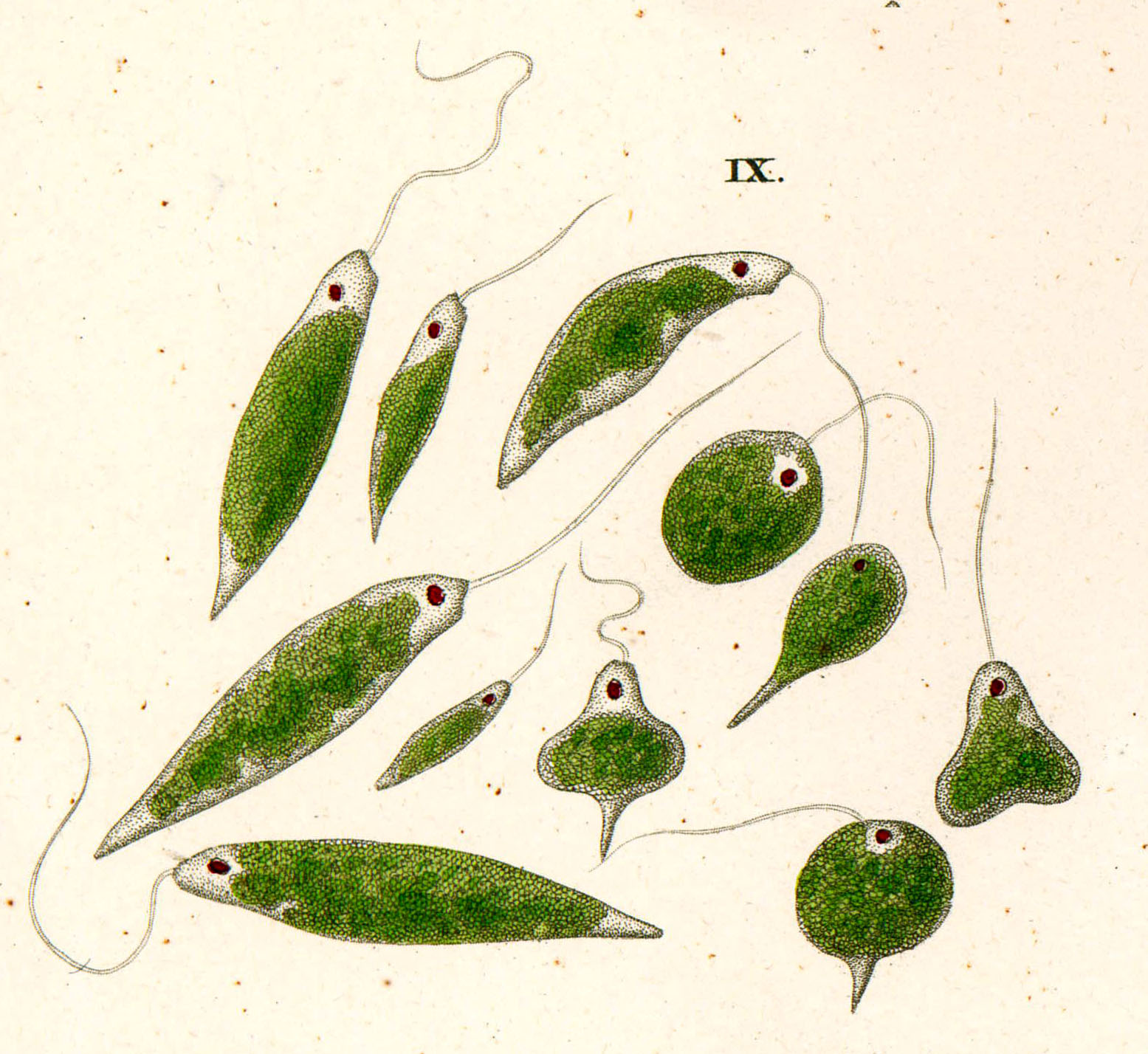
- Illustration, by Ehrenberg

Scientific classification
- Domain: Eukaryota
- Supergroup: Discoba
- Phylum: Euglenozoa
- Class: Euglenida
- Clade: Euglenophyceae
- Order: Euglenales
- Family: Euglenaceae
- Genus: Euglena
- Species: E. viridis

Binomial name
- Euglena viridis (O.F.Müller) Ehrenberg

= Euglena viridis =

Species of Euglena

Euglena viridis is a single-celled species of euglenoid, a type of microalgae. It is one of the oldest-known species of Euglena, and was first seen by Antonie van Leeuwenhoek in 1764. It is found in freshwater habitats worldwide.

Euglena viridis, along with other Euglena species, are well-studied. Cells of E. viridis have a secondary chloroplast. The chloroplast is bounded by three layers of membrane without a nucleomorph.

== Taxonomy ==
Euglena viridis is one of the first Euglena species named when Ehrenberg established the genus Euglena. Euglena viridis is also the type species of this genus.

The whole group of Euglenozoa was originally placed in a group called Excavata. However, Excavata has been thought not monophyletic and is divided into several groups. Now, Euglenozoa is placed below a group in Discoba.

=== Phylogeny ===
According to molecular evidence, phylogenetic relationships between Euglena viridis and its close relatives are as follows:

- - - - - - - - - E. stellata
                - E. tristella
              - - - E. chadefaudii
                  - E. pseudochadefaudii
                - E. granulata
            - - E. laciniata
              - E. pseudostellata
          - - E. geniculata
            - E. splendens
        - E. cantabrica
      - - E. viridis
        - E. pseudoviridis
    - - - E. agilis
        - E. gracilis
      - E. gymnodinioides
  - - - E. satelles
      - E. mutabilis
    - E. deses

The phylogenetic trees of the Euglena genus still have some clades with polytomy. The phylogenetic relationship of Euglena viridis with other Euglena species is still unclear until 2017.

== Morphology ==
Euglena viridis consists of single cells with two flagella, although one flagellum is very reduced and so only one is visible under the microscope. Normally, it is 40–65 μm long, slightly bigger than other well-known Euglena species: Euglena gracilis. The cells are narrowly or widely spindle-shaped, rounded at the anterior end and pointed at the posterior end. The cell is surrounded by pellicle, which has faint spiral striations. Each cell has a single central chloroplast which is irregular and stellate, with pyrenoids. The central area of the chloroplast has a mass of paramylon grains, with additional paramylon grains scattered throughout the cell. The single emergent flagellum is roughly as long as the cell, but is sometimes dropped. Cells have a single, reddish eyespot (stigma).

E. viridis typically moves with a squirming motion known as metaboly; it may also swim very rapidly. The cells can also round up to form cysts.

E. viridis can be distinguished from most other Euglena species by its one axial, stellate chloroplast with a paramylon center in it. But there are still five species sharing these morphological features. E. viridis differs from similar species (E. stellata, E. pseudostellata, and E. cantabrica) from lacking mucocysts (the mucocysts are only visible after staining with a dye such as neutral red), and is apparently morphologically identical to its sister species Euglena pseudoviridis.

== Habitat and distribution ==
Euglena viridis is common in bodies of water rich in organic compounds. It has a cosmopolitan distribution.

Euglena is considered to be one of the most pollution-tolerant algal genera, and E. viridis is an indicator of moderate to heavy pollution. E. viridis commonly forms green blooms in farmyards and sewage outfalls.

== Uses ==
Euglena viridis can be bought as a culture through some institutions and can be maintained by replenishing it with fresh tap water and fresh leaf blades once a week. Such accessibility lets it easily be used. For example, a research tests new cultivating system by cultivating Euglena viridis. Additionally, E. viridis is used as teaching material in classrooms in order to demonstrate important biology concepts such as phylogenetic relationships and exponential population growth.

In a wastewater biodegradation system, algae can provide the oxygen that heterotrophic bacteria need for the degradation of organic matter. The ability to live in polluted water bodies have let Euglena viridis be used as an oxygen producer in wastewater biodegrading systems; it has been proven that Euglena viridis can enhance biodegradation in piggery wastewater degradation system.
