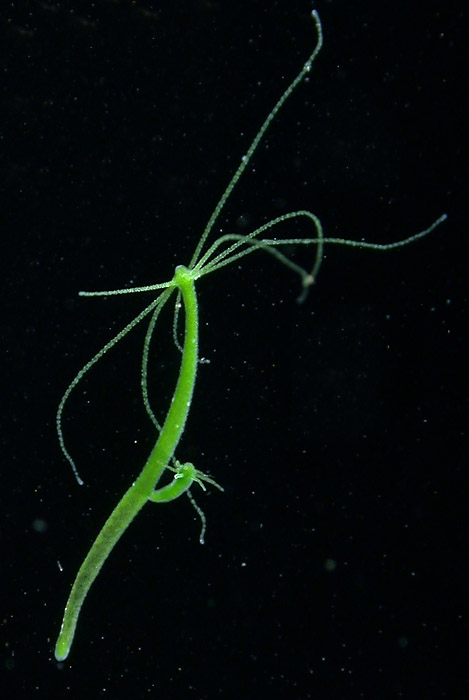
- Hydra viridissima

Scientific classification
- Kingdom: Animalia
- Phylum: Cnidaria
- Class: Hydrozoa
- Order: Anthoathecata
- Family: Hydridae
- Genus: Hydra
- Species: H. viridissima

Binomial name
- Hydra viridissima Pallas, 1766

Synonyms
- Chlorohydra viridissima (Pallas, 1766); Hydra viridis Linnaeus, 1767

= Hydra viridissima =

Species of hydrozoan

Hydra viridissima is a species of cnidarian which is commonly found in still or slow-moving freshwater in the Northern temperate zone. Hydra viridissima is commonly called green hydra due to its coloration, which is due to the symbiotic green algae Chlorella vulgaris which live within its body. Recent genomic research has shown that Hydra viridissima suppresses parts of its innate immune system to allow its symbiotic Chlorella algae to survive within its cells. This adaptation provides insight into the evolution of intracellular symbiosis in early metazoans. These creatures are typically 10 mm long and have tentacles that are about half of their length. They are strictly carnivorous and typically feed on small crustaceans, insects and annelids. Hydra are normally sessile and live on aquatic vegetation. They secrete mucus to attach to substrate using their basal disc.

"Green hydra" more broadly refers to a clade containing H. viridissima and closely-related photosymbiotic species. There are at least 4 species in this clade: this species, H. hadleyi, H. plagiodesmica, and H. sinensis.

== Anatomy ==
Hydra are multi-cellular organisms. They are made up of two layers of epithelial cells and have a hypostome or mouth opening. Circling the mouth are tentacles that contain nematocysts or stinging cells to help in prey capture. The mouth and tentacles are called the hydranth. The rest of the Hydra is known as the column and is divided into four sections: the gastric section (between the tentacles and first bud), budding section (which produces the buds), the peduncle (between the lowest bud and basal disc), and the basal disc (foot-like structure). Hydra are diploblastic organisms, the body is composed of two embryonic cell layers; the ectoderm and the endoderm. The endoderm lines the gastrovascular cavity, which is a water-filled sac, this acts as a hydroskeleton and site for food digestion. They also have a simple nervous system that consist of a nerve net that covers the entire body.

== Movement ==
Although Hydra are sessile, they can move in short bursts. An individual can extend and contract with a mixture of muscle movement and water (hydraulic) pressure created inside the digestive cavity. Tiny cells that line the digestive system possess flagella which create a current to draw water into the digestive cavity. These cells can extend the length of the body column. They can detach their basal disc from the substrate and move to a new location by gliding or by "somersaulting", which they do by detaching the disc then bending over and over using the tentacles to push over when they rotate around. Individuals may repeat attaching and detaching many times until they find a desirable location. Hydra can also move by floating upside down using a gas bubble produced on the basal disc which carries the creature to the water surface.

== Symbiosis ==
H. viridissima has a permanent symbiotic relationship with photosynthetic unicellular Chlorella algae. These algae are located in the endodermal epithelial cells which are enclosed by an individual vacuolar membrane, which enclose inorganic and organic molecules for storage. The endodermal epithelium is composed of many cells, each housing 20–40 individual algae organisms. The algae supply nutrients produced via photosynthesis to the Hydra. Because the algae live in the vacuoles of the cells, they are protected from the digestive enzymes of the Hydra. During long period of darkness, such as storms or blooms that block sunlight, algae loss starts from the tentacles, hypostome and growth region. When light conditions return, the algae undergo rapid multiplication and can repopulate the host in approximately two days. Chlorella undergo asexual reproduction which is in correlation with the division of the host. The Hydra regulates the population of the Chlorella algae by digesting excess algae or controlling algal cell division.

There are several diverged lines of H. viridissima being kept in captivity, called strains. Strains M9, M8, K10 and J8 naturally carry a symbiote, while strains B5 and N11 do not, making the latter two apo-symbiotic. It is possible to remove the symbiote from symbiotic strains and obtain viable apo-symbiotic Hydra. Chlorella from a symbiotic H. viridissima strain can multiply in an apo-symbiotic strain. The symbiotic strains have co-evolved with their symbiotes; exchanging the symbiotes between them result in viable but less healthy (in terms of morphology and behavior) individuals, with some strains tolerating the exchange better than others.

The genomes of a host-symbiote pair (both called strain A99) have been sequenced.

=== Taxonomy of symbiote ===
Among all Chlorella with full genomes available in 2018, C. sp. A99 is most similar to C. variabilis. On the other hand, the K10 strain appears closer to C. vulgaris on the basis of 18S rRNA and rbcL.

== Growth pattern ==
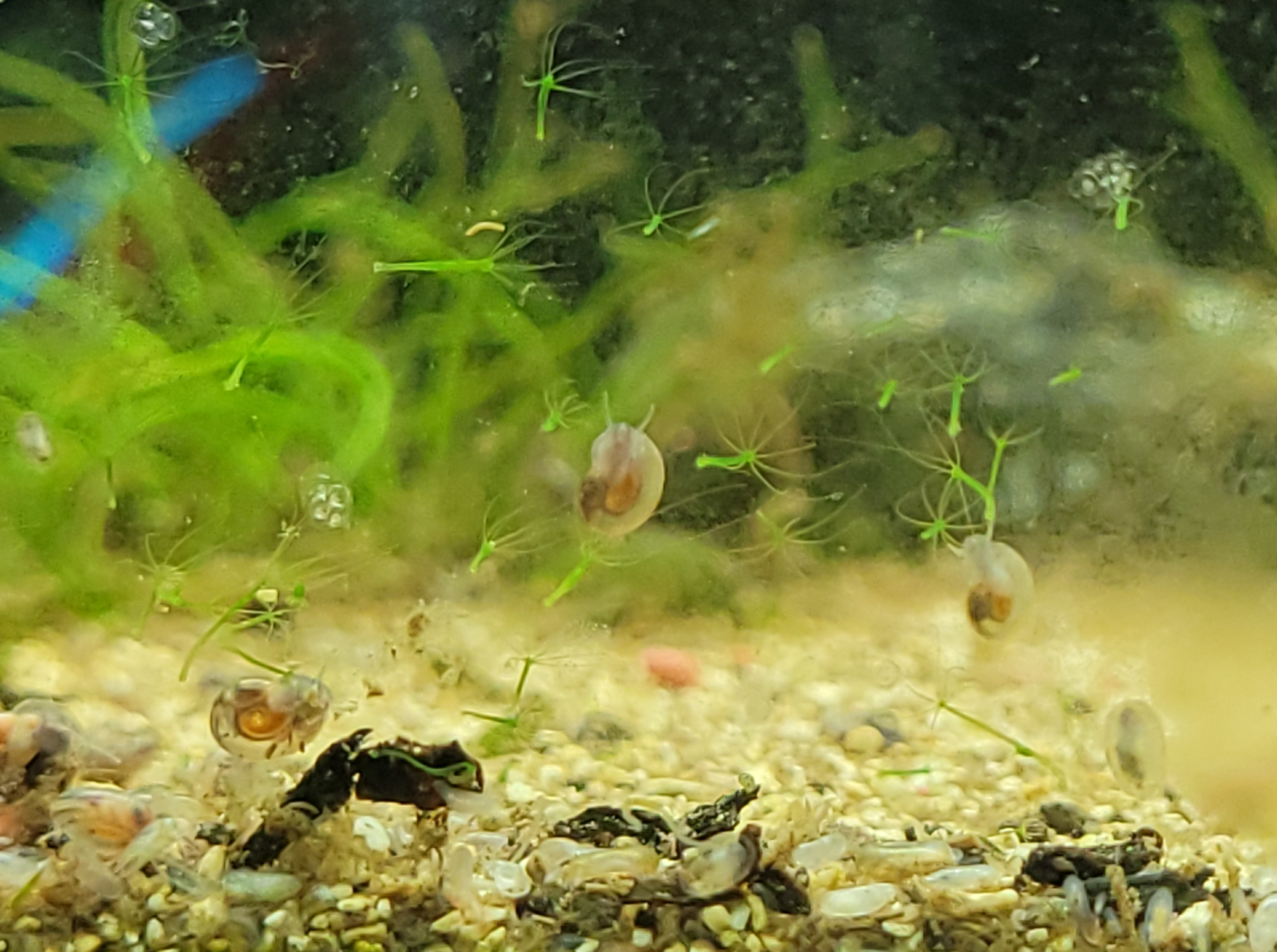
Hydra viridissima in a freshwater aquarium

Hydra are capable of escaping death by renewing their body tissues. Mortality rates are extremely low and there have been no signs of decline in reproductive rate.

== Sensitivity to pollution ==
Hydra cannot be found in impaired water due to their low tolerance to pollution. They can be used to rank toxicants by their level of potential hazard. The Hydra's simple tubular body and diploblastic membranes results in all of the epithelial cells being in constant contact with the environment; this allows for the entire surface of its body to be exposed to toxic substances in water. High concentrations of metal ions can cause mortality. One advantage of being able to reproduce asexually is that they can still reproduce successfully during times where there are harsh metals.

== Reproduction ==
Hydra are typically hermaphroditic or gonochoric. Uniquely to Hydra, the medusa stage is absent and only the polyps will reproduce sexually and asexually. H. viridissima will reproduce sexually when temperatures have warmed to at least 20 °C, typically this falls between May and June. Larger individuals will produce both ovaries and testes, while smaller individuals only develop testicles. Sexual reproduction can be seen as a strategy to survive during times of low nutrients and other unfavorable conditions. H. viridissima has three sexes: female, male, and hermaphrodite. Simultaneous hermaphrodites are dominant during the growing season. It is thought that female gonads need a longer period of inductive conditions for production, that means that there is a scarcity of females in most populations. During the summer months, specifically in Poland Lemna bloom occurs that reduces light attenuation which reduces photosynthesis efficiency of the Chlorella algae, this influences the asexual behavior. Even though during the beginning of the mating season for the Hydra, all the individuals are sexually active, asexual reproduction is a main strategy for reproduction. This behavior of interference of asexual and sexual reproduction allows population growth to continue throughout all conditions.

When the Hydra reproduces asexually, buds will be produced that attach to the body wall. The buds are genetically identical clones of the parent. When they are mature they will break free. The parent can possess several buds that are at different stages of development at the same time. The bud once detached from the parent will float until they find some hard substrate to attach to.
