= Ben-Gurion Tomb National Park =

National park in Israel

Ben-Gurion Tomb National Park is a national park located next to the Midreshet Ben-Gurion. The garden was established around the grave plot where the first Prime Minister of the State of Israel David Ben-Gurion and his wife Paula were buried. The plot overlooks the channel of Nahal Tzin. The site is managed by the Nature and Gardens Authority.

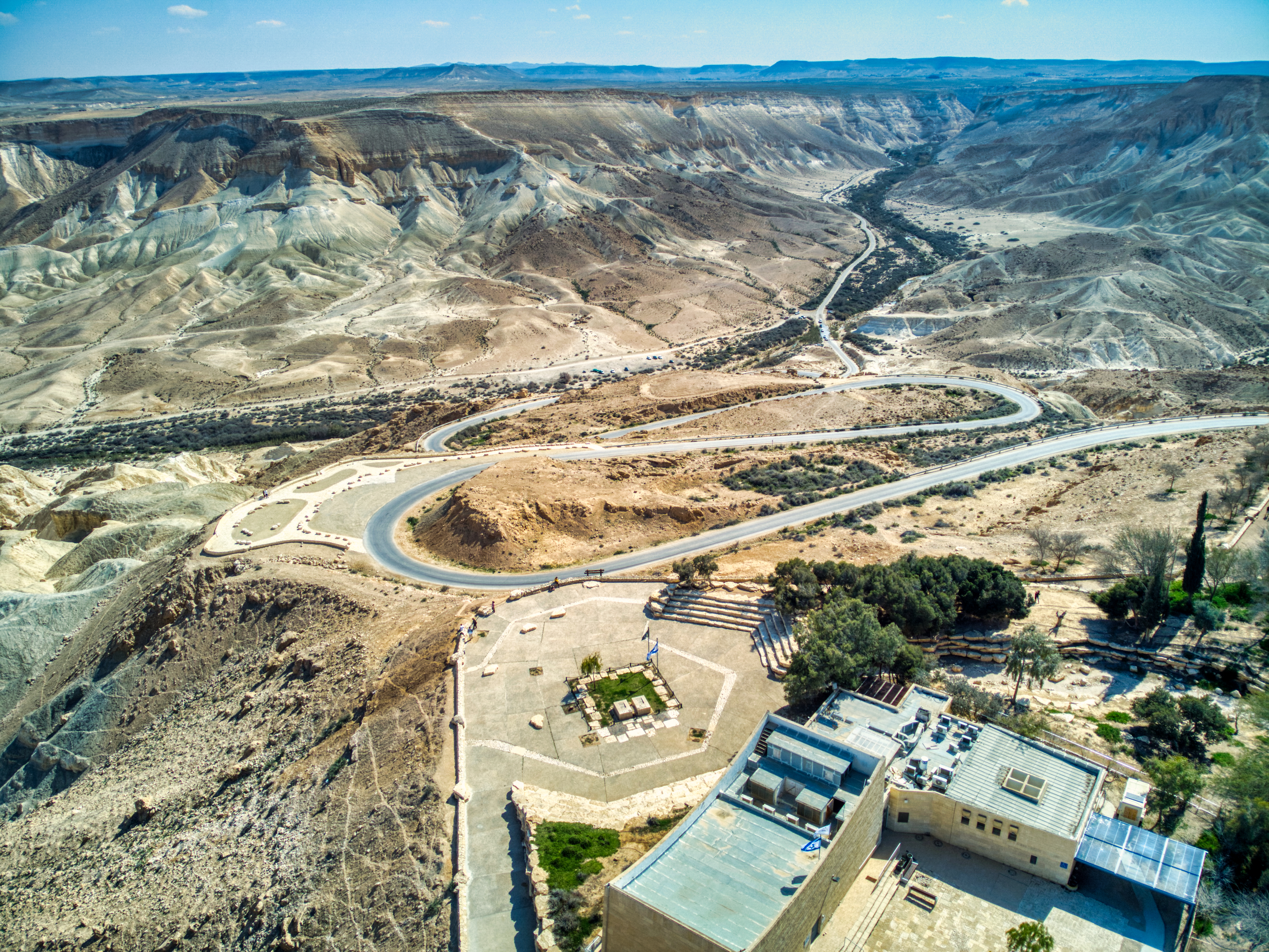
The park overlooks the channel of Nahal Tzin

== History ==
Paula Ben-Gurion died on January 29, 1968, about six years before her husband's death. Upon her death, Ben-Gurion was required to choose a site for her burial and his own burial when his day came. He chose a plot south of the library building of Midrash Sde Boker, located a few kilometers south of Kibbutz Sde Boker where he lived with his wife. On January 30, Paula Ben-Gurion's funeral was held there. In this choice, Ben-Gurion waived his right to be buried with his wife in the nation's grand plot on Mount Herzl in Jerusalem.

The planning of the tomb estate by the National Parks Authority began after the burial of Ben-Gurion's wife at the site and before the death of Ben-Gurion himself. The site was qualified for its designation as a grave estate, and as part of this, earthworks were carried out that resulted in raising the level of the grave square by many meters. On December 1, 1973, Ben-Gurion died and two days later he was buried there.

In May 1974, the National Parks Authority held a public architectural competition for the design of the burial square and its surroundings, in which it was requested to design the place as a park that would allow visitors to make a pilgrimage and be modest but full of majesty. Yaakov Yanai, chairman of the National Parks Authority, wrote to the government secretariat that it is appropriate to demolish the library building at the foot of which the burial plaza stands in order to free up space around it, but in the competition the participants were required to leave the building in place and incorporate it into their plan. Later the library building became the home of the Ben-Gurion Heritage Institute.

A 13-member judging committee examined 54 proposals submitted as part of the competition by architects, artists and sculptors, and chose the proposal of landscape architects Lipa Yahlom and Dan Tzur.

In February 1989, an ultra-Orthodox organization called Kash'at ("Torah Observant Group" or "Group that will not complete") desecrated Ben-Gurion's grave and painted swastikas on it. In March 2005, the inscription "Hitler" was sprayed on Ben-Gurion's grave by Right-wing workers who acted against the Israeli disengagement from Gaza.

== Description ==
The garden covers an area of 90 dunams, most of which is covered with vegetation. A winding path leads from the parking lot at the entrance to the garden to the burial ground located in the southeastern part of the garden. Stepped stone slabs and rocks placed on both sides of the path and next to them vegetation and trees give it the appearance of a river channel.

The tombstones of the Ben-Gurion couple are located in the heart of the square and on the side is a plot of vegetation and papelion trees. They are surrounded by a black metal chain on top of pillars. The tombstones were designed by the sculptor Ezra Orion. They are rectangular and built of simple stones, and inside wide recesses in the upper part are fixed diagonal tablets on which are engraved the names of the deceased, the years of their birth and death as well as the years they immigrated to the Land of Israel.

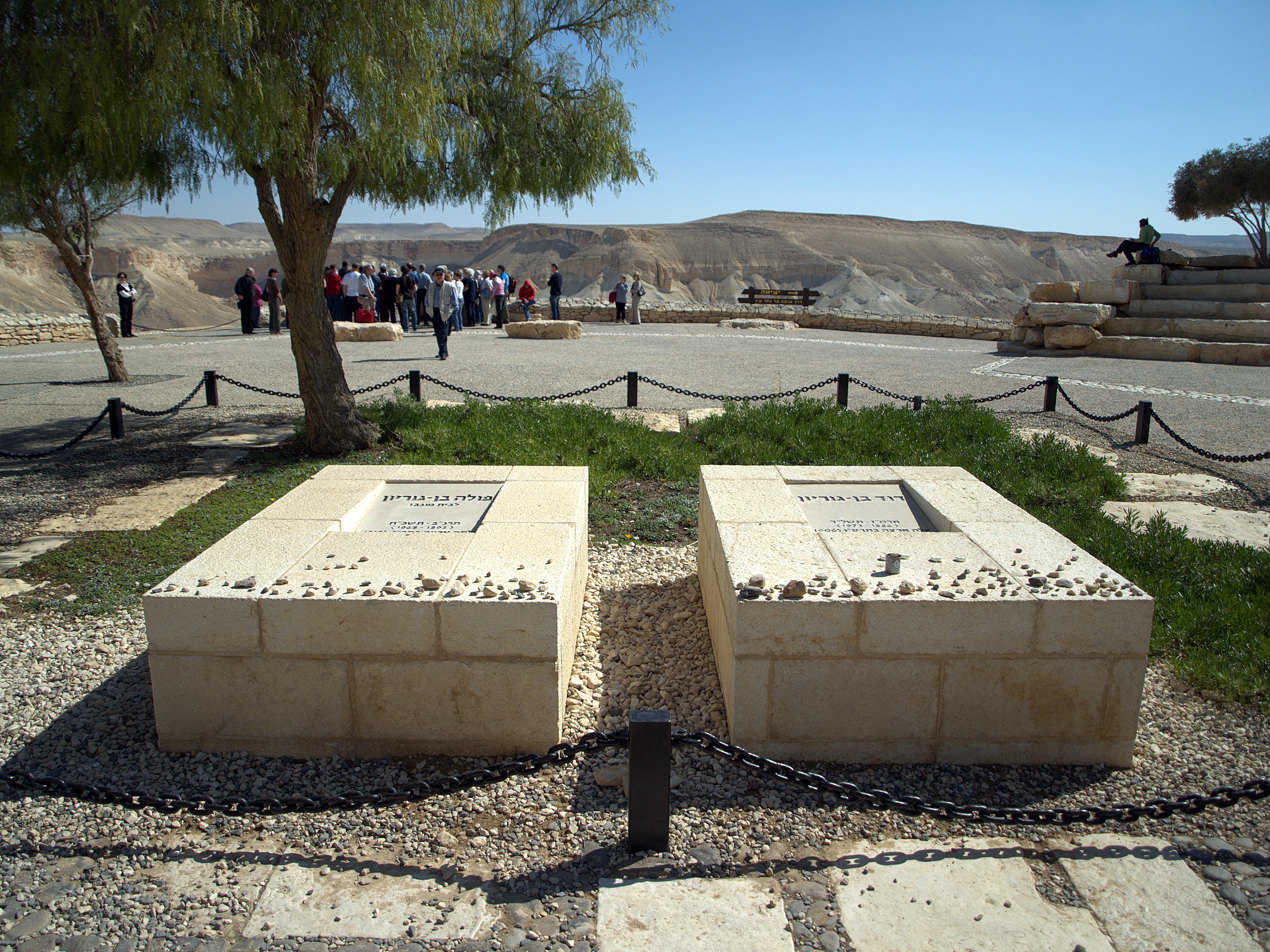
David Ben-Gurion's Grave

The burial square is surrounded by stepped rock slabs that are also seats for the audience as well as a low stone fence on the southern edge. It looks south to the deep channel of Nahal Tzin and the desert landscape beyond it.

During the annual memorial day for David Ben-Gurion, starting on Friday in or near Kislu, the state memorial ceremony for Ben-Gurion and his wife was held in the burial square.
