= Nahal HaRo'a =

Naẖal HaRo'a נחל הרועה

Location
- Country: Israel

Physical characteristics
- Mouth
  - location: Nahal Boker
  - coordinates: 30°54′10″N 34°46′0″E

Naẖal HaRo'a (Hebrew: נחל הרועה, lit. 'Shepherd's Wadi', with the word for "shepherd" being in its feminine form) is a wadi in the northern Negev Mountains, from the tributaries of Nahal HaBesor. Along its length are impressive remains of ancient Nabatean agriculture and a water plant by means of which the stream crosses Kemer Halukim. One of its tributaries is Nahal Halukim (lit. 'Pebbles Wadi' or 'Cobbles Wadi'); the ancient name of the stream was "Wadi Halikom", after the riverbed pebbles (Hebrew: חלוקי נחל, ẖalukei naẖal) whose name has been preserved in Kemer Halukim.

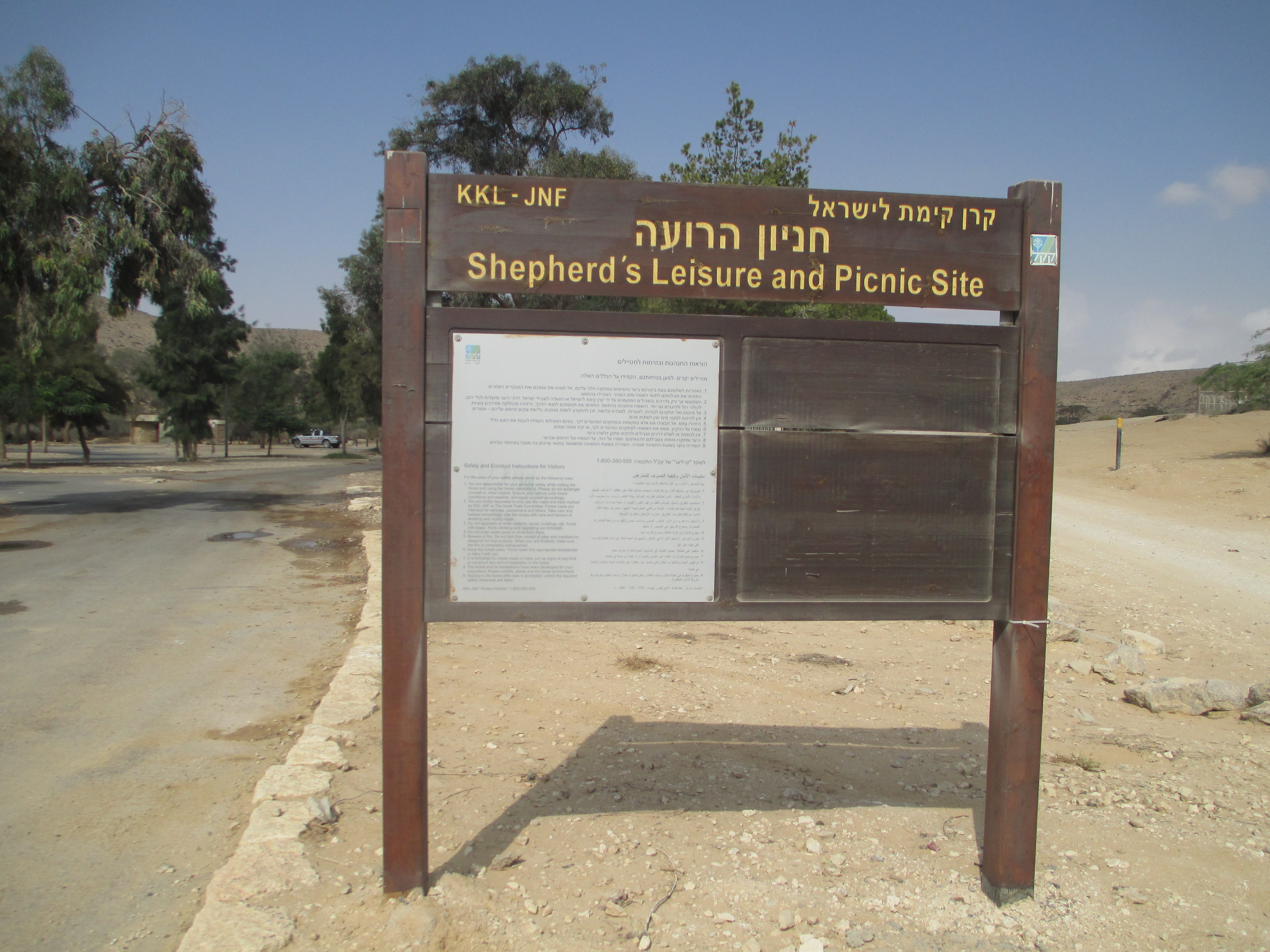
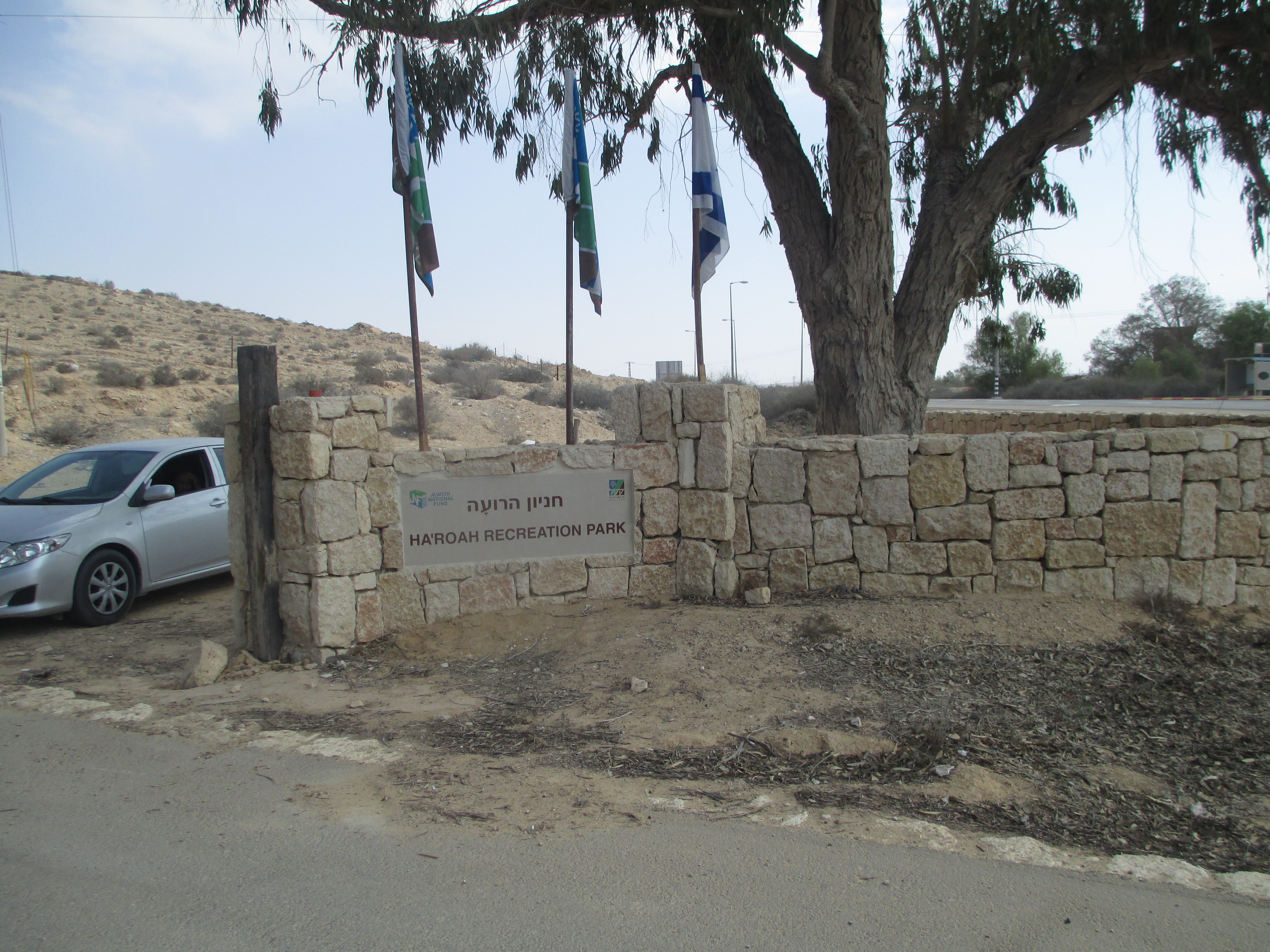
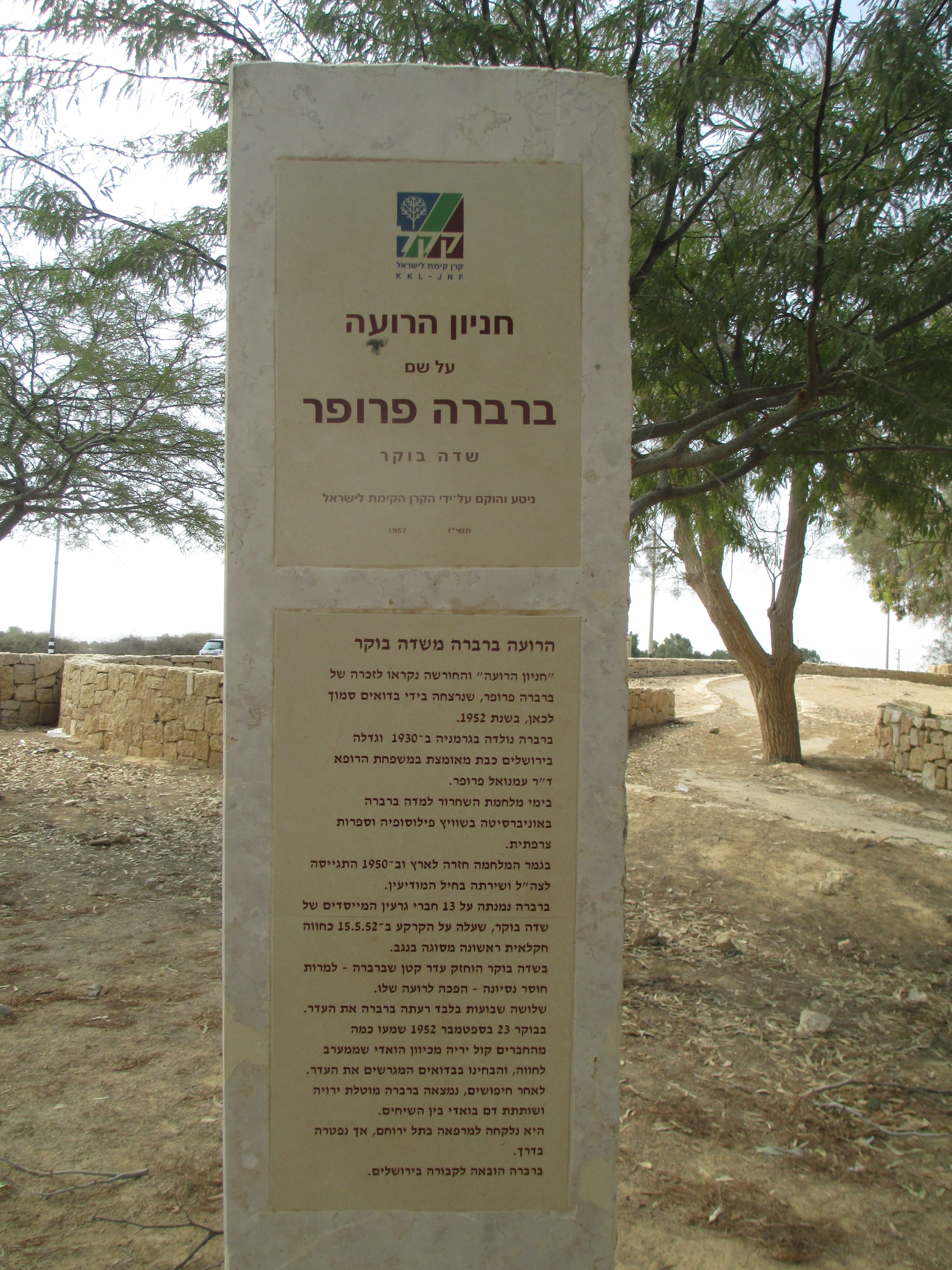

The wadi's name (meaning "Shepherd's Wadi" or "Shepherd's Creek"), along with the nearby Shepherd's Parking (חניון הרועה, H̱anyon HaRo'a), was given in memory of Barbara Proper (1930–1952), who was murdered on the spot by Bedouins from the area. Barbara Proper was born in Germany, to a Jewish mother. She immigrated to Israel and grew up in Jerusalem, as an adopted daughter of Johanna and Dr. Emmanuel Proper.

The Shepherd's Ruins (חורבת הרועה, H̱urbat HaRo'a), or the Shepherd's Site (אתר הרועה, Atar HaRo'a), is an archaeological site located in the Negev Mountains, about 5 km northeast of kibbutz Sde Boker, near the road from there to Yeruham, at 30°54′28″N 34°51′12″E. The site is located on a hill that dominates an ancient road along Nahal HaRo'a, which is 10 m above its surroundings, and 550 m above sea level.
