= Ben-Gurion House =

Historic museum in Tel Aviv

Coordinates: 32.085329°N 34.771718°E

- בית בן-גוריון
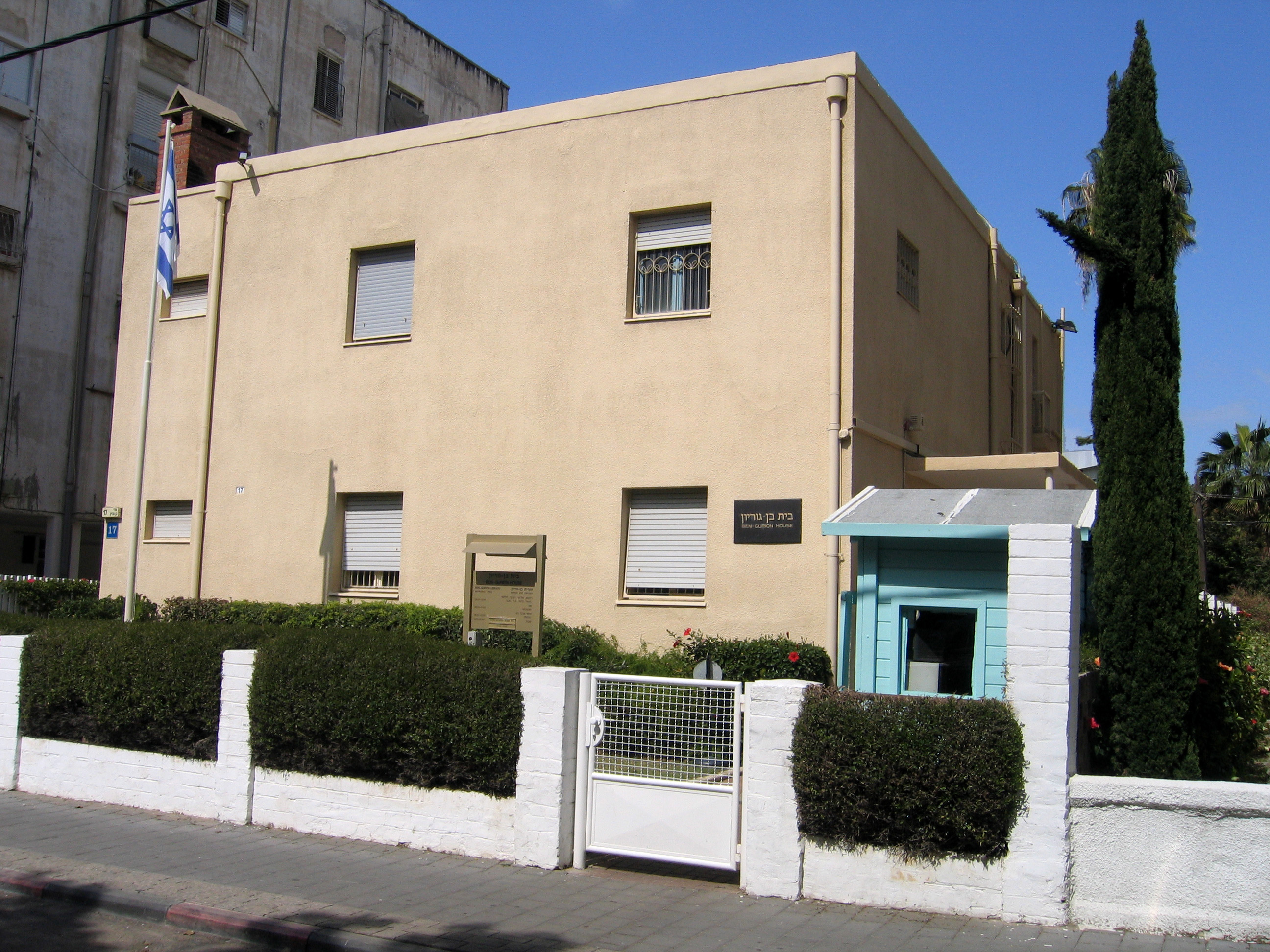
- Front of the house
- Established: November 29, 1974
- Location: 17 Ben-Gurion Boulevard, Tel Aviv, Israel
- Type: Historic house museum

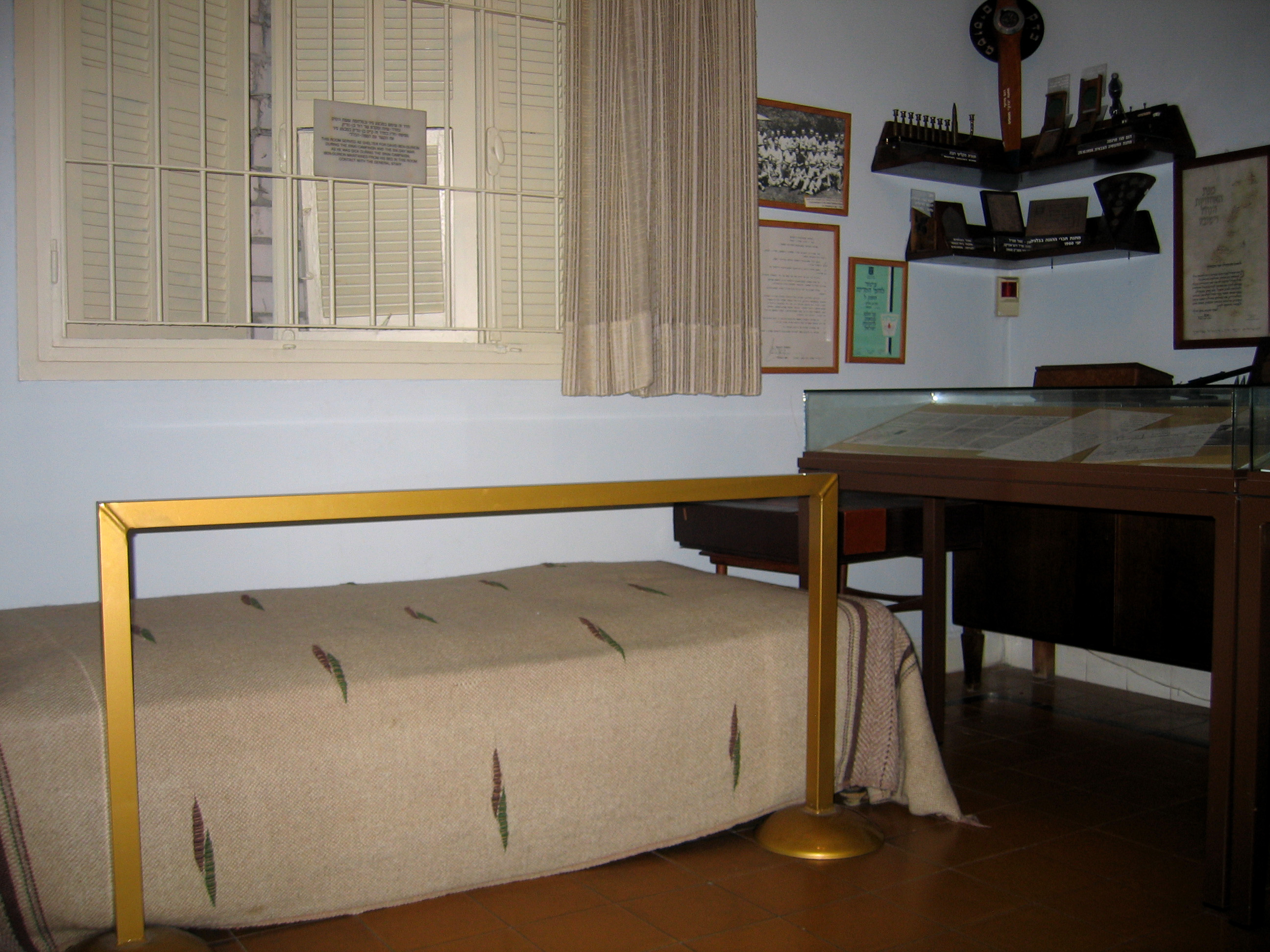
Renana's room, 1st floor

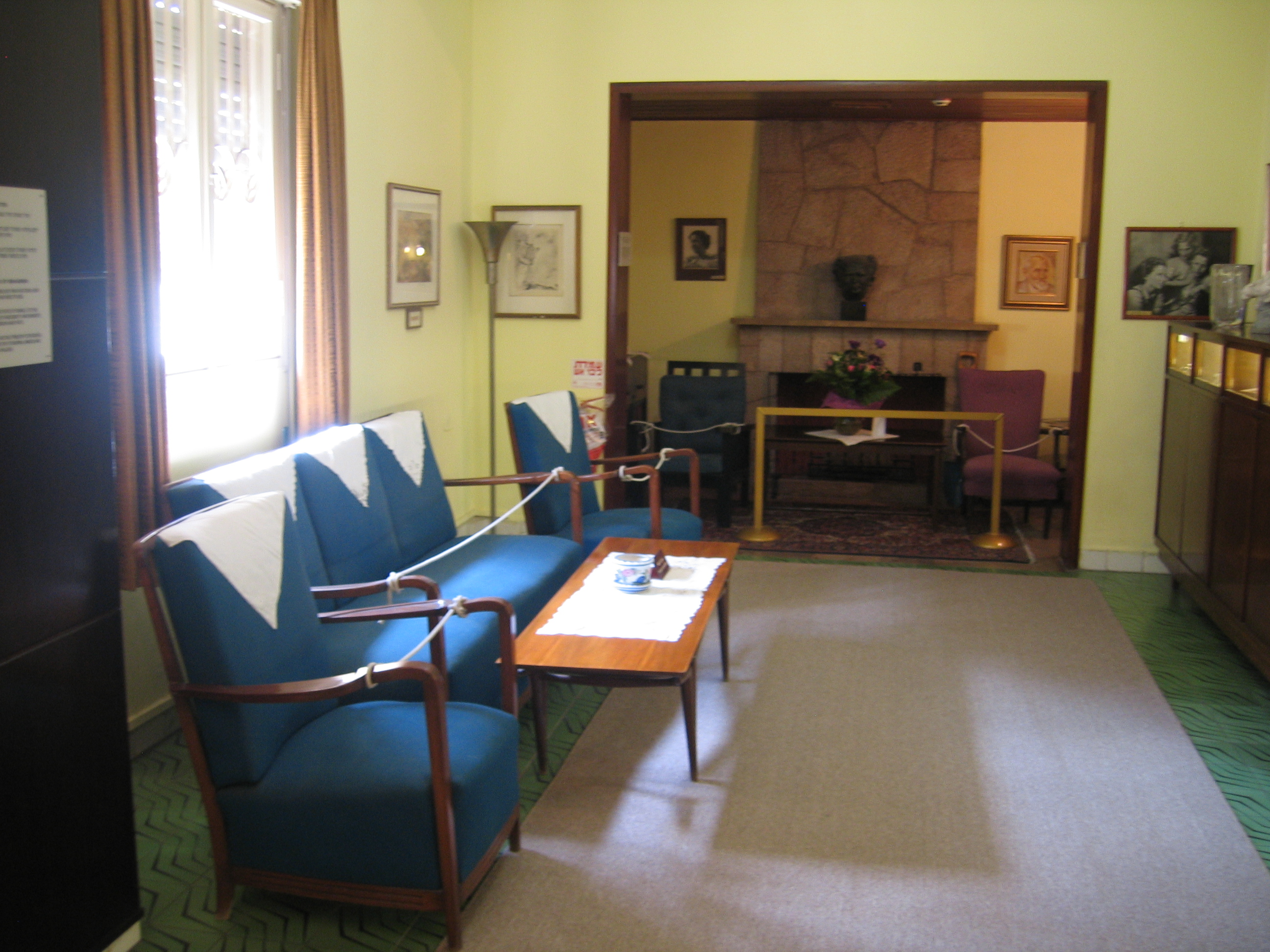
Guest Room, 1st floor

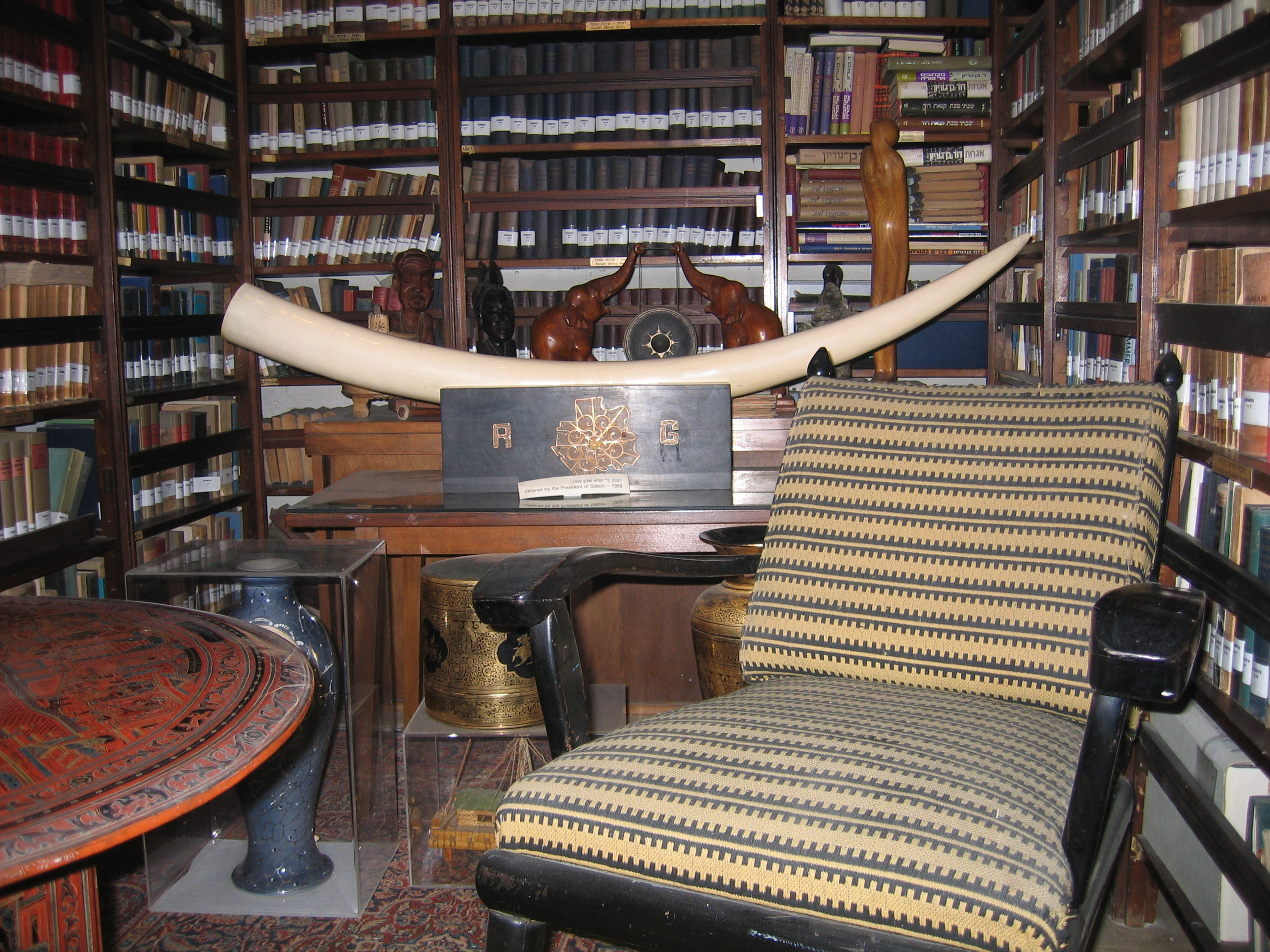
Section of the Library, 2nd floor

The Ben-Gurion House is a historic house museum in Tel Aviv, which served as the family home of pre-State Zionist leader and then first Defense and Prime Minister of Israel, David Ben-Gurion, between 1931 and 1953. Until his death in 1973, it continued serving as an additional residence, along with two others, one private – "Ben-Gurion's hut" at Kibbutz Sde Boker in the Negev (known as his desert home), and the official residence as Prime Minister of Israel during his multiple terms as head of government. The latter, known as Julius Jacobs House, is located in Rehavia, Jerusalem.

Ben-Gurion House is located at 17, Ben-Gurion Boulevard in northern Tel Aviv.

== History and structure ==
The house was built in 1930–1931, and David Ben-Gurion and his family lived there from June 1931 until 1953, when they moved to a small wooden house in Kibbutz Sde-Boker in the Negev desert, after which they returned to the Tel Aviv house only part of each year.

The house was built on Jewish National Fund (JNF) land, when the first shechunat ha-po'alim (lit. workers neighborhood, i.e. a workers housing project) was established there in 1930–31, as Shechunat HaPo'alim Aleph, at the junction of Jewish National Fund Boulevard and Lassalle Street. The Jewish National Fund (Hebrew: Keren Kayemet Le'Israel) Boulevard was renamed to Ben-Gurion Boulevard after the politician's death in 1973.

The house was designed by engineer David Tuvia, and as customary in "workers neighborhoods" in Israel at the time, the house included only one room and was worth 350 British Mandate pounds. The Ben-Gurion family asked for permission to build a second floor, which was granted. The house was expanded in 1946, and renovated in 1960.

=== First floor ===
The first floor included the room of Ben-Gurion's second daughter, Renana. It also served Ben-Gurion during the Suez Crisis (Mivtza' Kadesh, "Operation Kadesh") as a shelter and a bedroom. From this room Ben-Gurion conducted his communication with Moshe Dayan, then his Chief of Staff, and from there he received front line updates on the progress of the operation.

=== Second floor ===
The second floor houses a four-room library, a toilet and a bedroom, and served only Ben-Gurion himself at the time.

The library holds his personal collection of periodicals and 20,000 books, in ancient Greek, Latin, English, Hebrew, French, Turkish, German, Russian and other languages. The library, known for its unusual size, may give an idea as to Ben-Gurion's fields of interest. The books deal mainly with the subjects of Zionism, history, various cultures and religions, a collections of Hebrew Bible books and more. The many books on IDF's fallen soldiers show the importance given to this subject by Ben-Gurion.

One of the library rooms served as Ben-Gurion's study room, where he had his own study corner, in which he wrote in his diary. It also contained a special phone, that was a direct line to the Defense Ministry's office (compare the Red Phone).

On 13 May 1948, Ben-Gurion hosted the Minhelet ha'am (People's Administration) body: Aharon Zisling, Yehuda Leib Maimon, and Moshe Sharett, where they formulated and drafted the final version of the Israeli Declaration of Independence (Megilat HaAtzma'ut). The next day, they went from this house to Dizengoff House, now known as Independence Hall, and where the Tel Aviv Museum of Art was located at the time, where Ben-Gurion announced on the establishment of the State of Israel.

== Present day ==
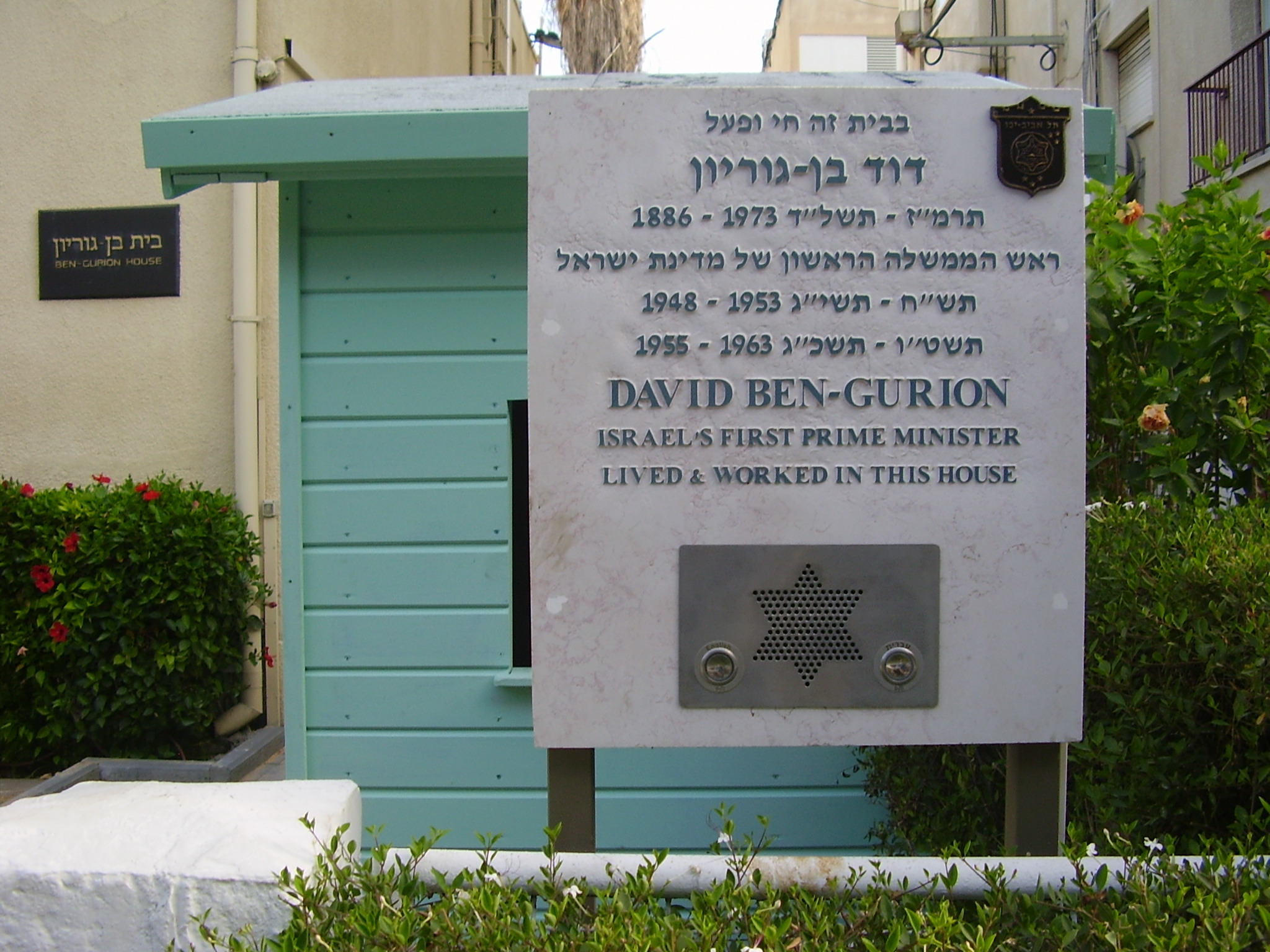
A sign in front of the Ben-Gurion House

In his will, Ben-Gurion gave the house to the State of Israel:

I hereby bequeath to the State of Israel my house in Tel Aviv

— Ben-Gurion's will

Three years after Ben-Gurion died, the Ben-Gurion Law 1977 was enacted, which stipulates that the house will be open to the public, and will serve as a museum in memory of Ben-Gurion and as a commemoration of his legacy, as well "as a Reading, Reviewing and Research center", as Ben-Gurion requested.

The house was opened to the public on 29 November 1974, and as of today, guided tours and symposiums are conducted in the house, with the purpose of depicting Ben-Gurion's character and life work as a leader. In addition, memorabilia, historical documents, and Ben-Gurion's titles awarded to him when he was prime minister are exhibited in the house.

The boulevard in which the house is situated was called at the time Ben-Gurion lived there Keren Kayemet Boulevard ("Jewish National Fund Boulevard"); it was renamed Ben-Gurion Boulevard after Ben-Gurion died. The name Keren Kayemet Boulevard was then given to a central street within the northern Tel Aviv neighborhood Ever Ha-Yarkon.

== See also ==
- Midreshet Ben-Gurion
