= Ben-Gurion's hut =

Retirement home of David Ben-Gurion

Coordinates: 30°52′27″N 34°47′21″E

Ben-Gurion's Hut
- צריף בן גוריון
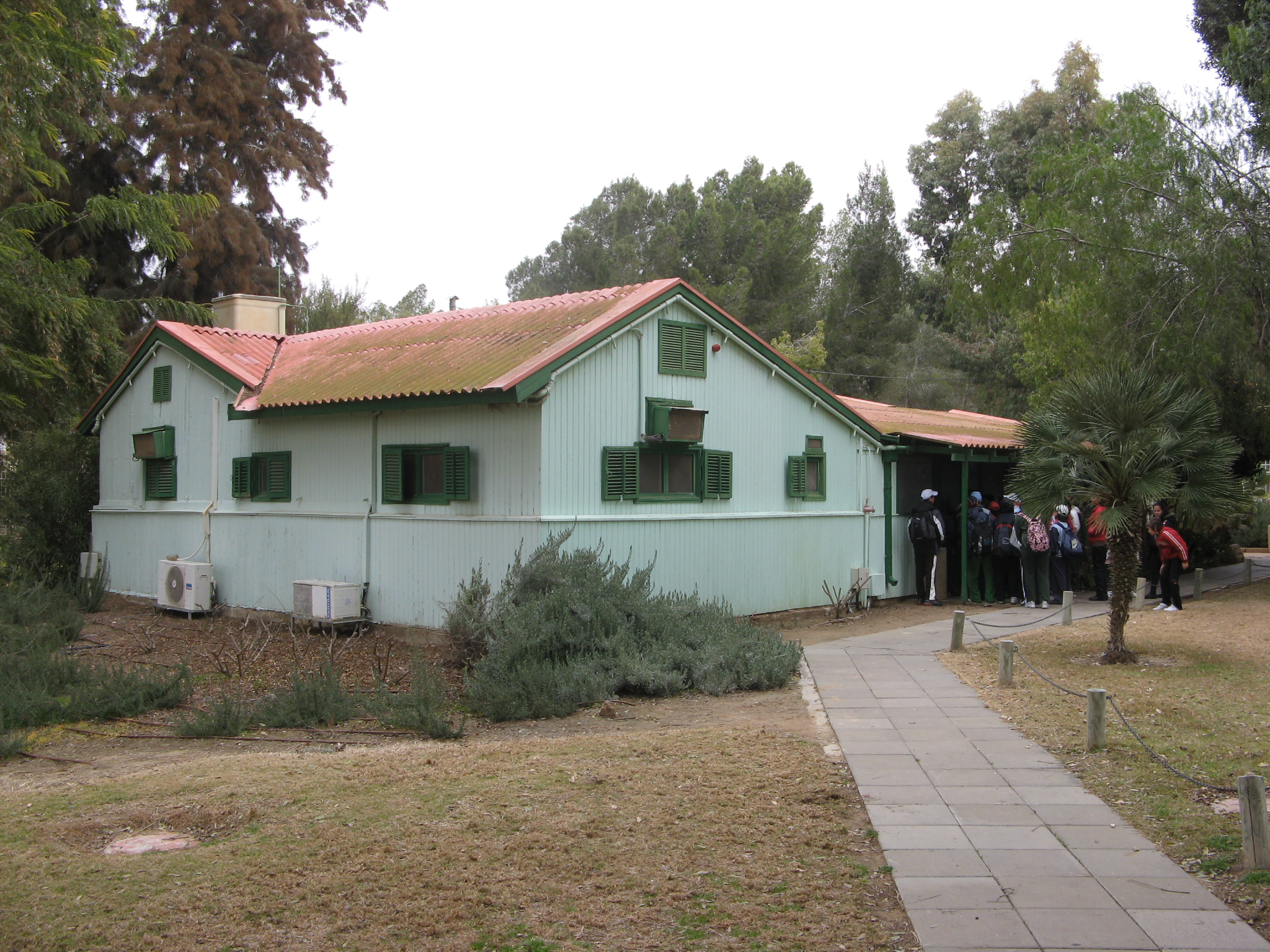
- Ben-Gurion's Hut
- Established: 1953
- Location: Kibbutz Sde Boker, Israel
- Type: Historic House Museum
- Collections: Artifacts and exhibits related to David Ben-Gurion’s life and legacy
- Owner: Ben-Gurion Heritage Institute
- Website: shimur.org/sites/ben-gurions-hut-sde-boker/

Ben-Gurion's hut (Hebrew: צריף בן גוריון, Tzrif Ben Gurion) was the retirement home of Israeli Prime Minister David Ben-Gurion and his wife Paula (Pola) from 1953 until Ben-Gurion's death in 1973. The "hut", located on kibbutz Sde Boker, was preserved exactly as it was left by Ben-Gurion and now serves as a museum with a visitor center operated by the Ben-Gurion Heritage Institute.

== History ==
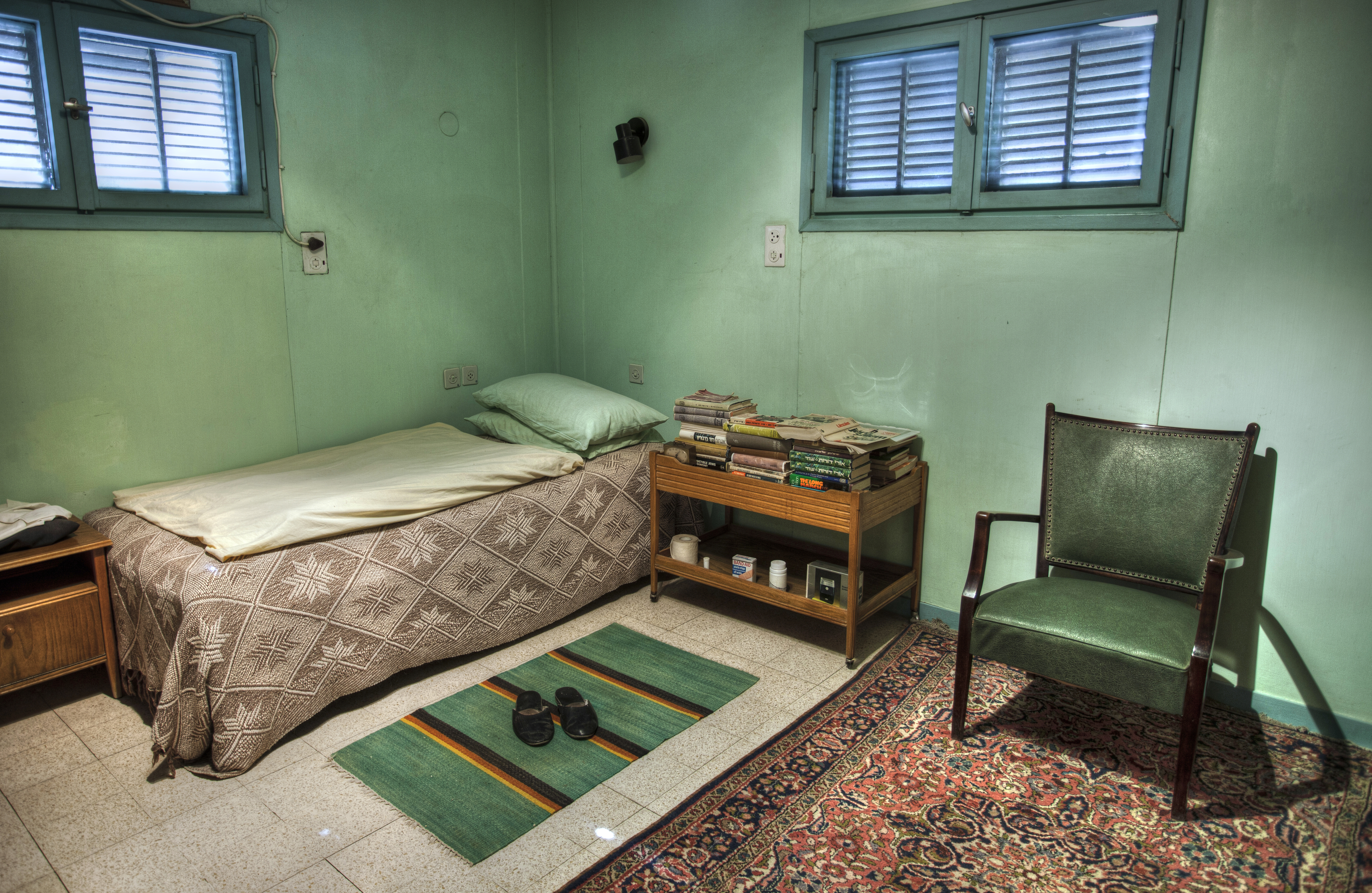
David Ben-Gurion's bedroom

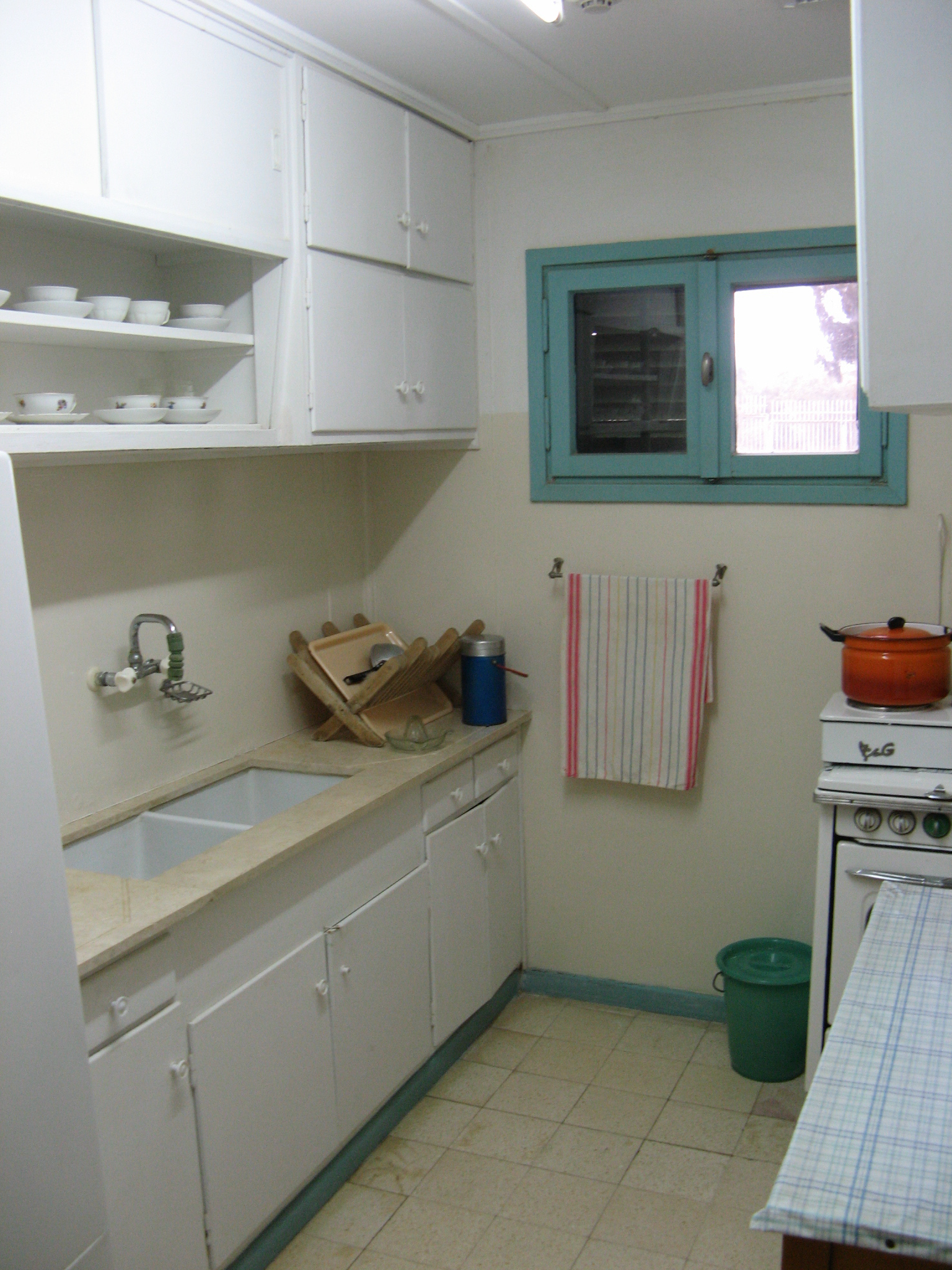
The hut's kitchen

In 1952, on a tour of Southern Israel, Ben-Gurion passed by a small community with only a hut and a few tents – Sde Boker. He stopped to greet the founders of the community, who he believed were doing a great service to the newly founded State by reclaiming the desert. Later, he sent a letter to the community wishing them luck and confiding in them his "jealousy" of their humble lifestyle. In 1953, Ben-Gurion and his wife joined the kibbutz and moved into the house. His move can be attributed to Ben-Gurion's wish to settle the Negev desert and lead by personal example. Additionally, he wished to disconnect from the pressures of his job and move to a remote part of the desert. In 1955, Ben-Gurion was re-elected Prime Minister. Throughout his term which lasted until 1963, Ben-Gurion resided in his home in Sde Boker, and he continued living there until his death in 1973.

Following the terms of Ben-Gurion's will, the house and everything inside remain intact and open to the public. A museum documenting the life and writings of Ben-Gurion was built at the site of the hut and attracts many tourists each year. A special focus was put on Ben-Gurion's vision to build up and settle the Negev Desert.

== See also ==
- Ben-Gurion House in Tel Aviv
- Media related to David Ben Gurion's house in Sde Boker at Wikimedia Commons
