= Midburn =

Festival in Israel

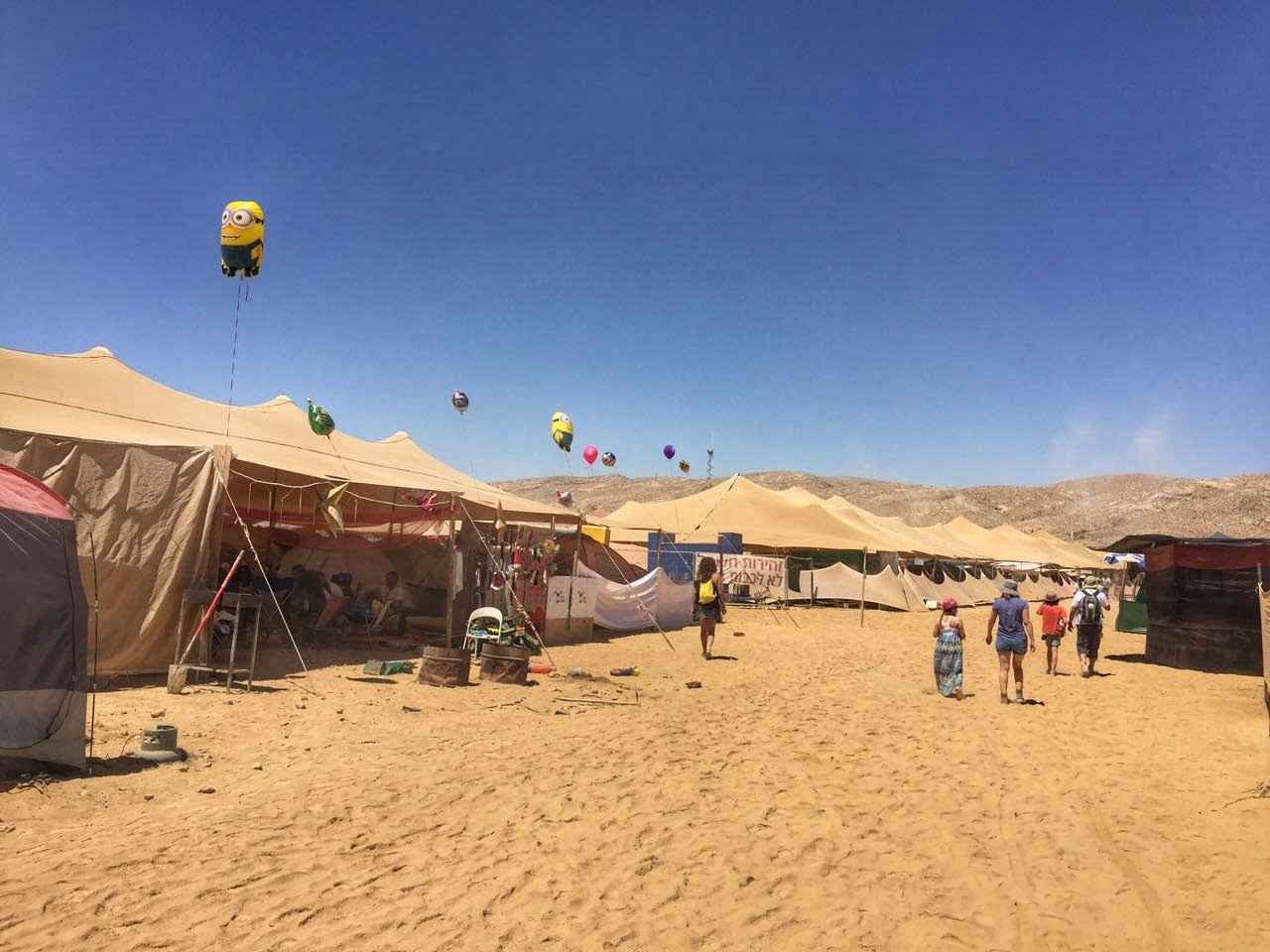
- Camp at Midburn 2016
- Locations: Negev Desert, Israel
- Inaugurated: June 16–19, 2014
- Most recent: October 10–15, 2022
- Participants: 11,000 (2017)
- Website: midburn.org/en/

Midburn (Hebrew: מידברן; Arabic: ميدبيرن) is a 6-day event held in the Negev Desert in southern Israel.

== History ==
The first annual event was held in June 2014, and was attended by 3,000 people. The second event was held on May 20–24, 2015, and was attended by 6,500 people. The name itself is a portmanteau of the Hebrew word for "desert" (מידבר midbar) and the English word "burn" in reference to the annual Burning Man festival in the Nevada desert.

The festival is held near Sde Boker, and the themes of the event are creativity, art and personal expression.

The burn is held every year in May or June, around the Jewish holiday of Shavuot, and culminates in a bonfire of wooden sculptures. The third Midburn event, in 2016, had an attendance of 8,000 participants, making it the 2nd biggest regional event outside the US, after AfrikaBurn. As of 2018, it is the only Burning Man regional event in the Middle East. The 2023 event was cancelled following the Gaza war.

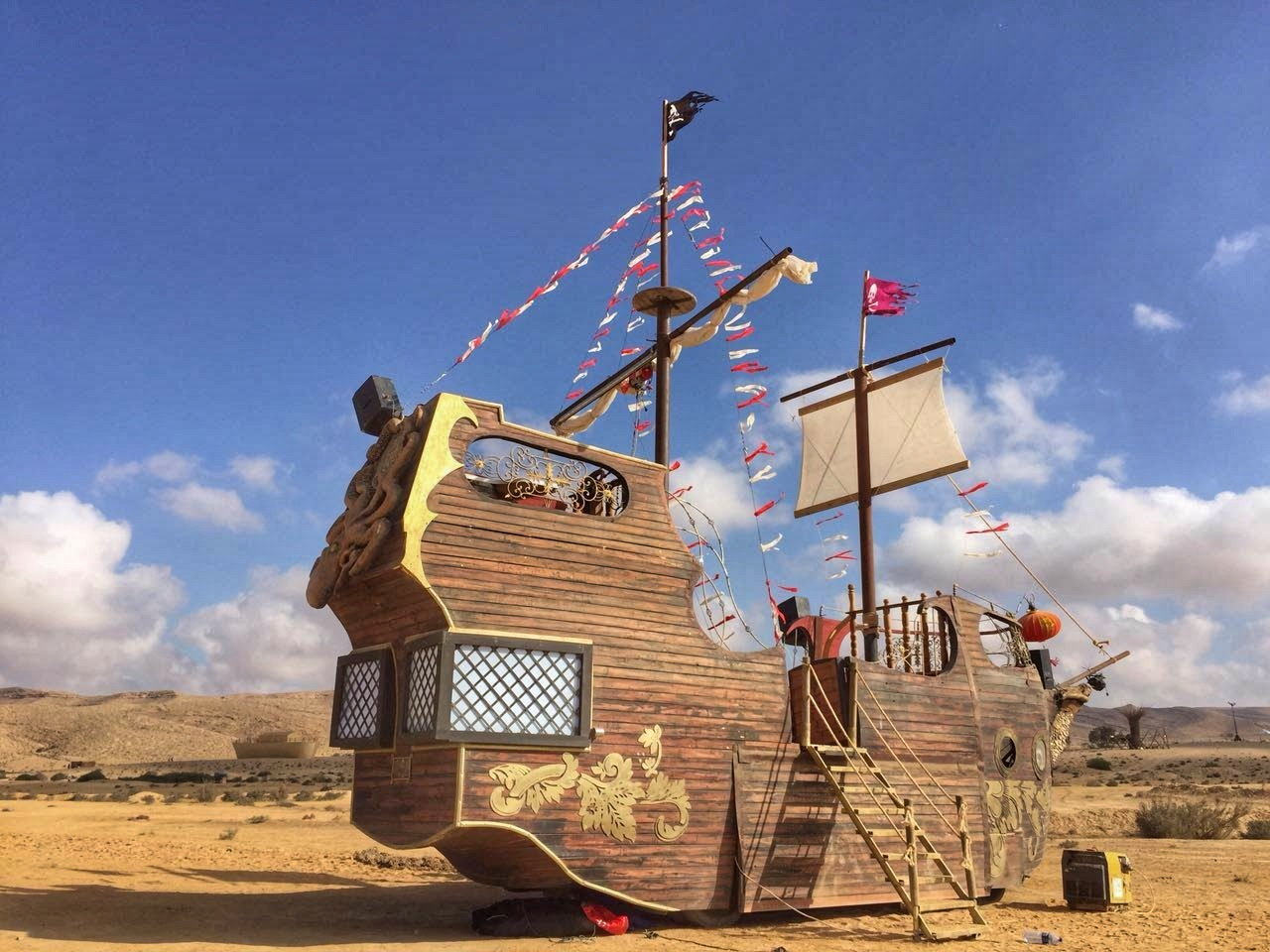
Midburn 2016

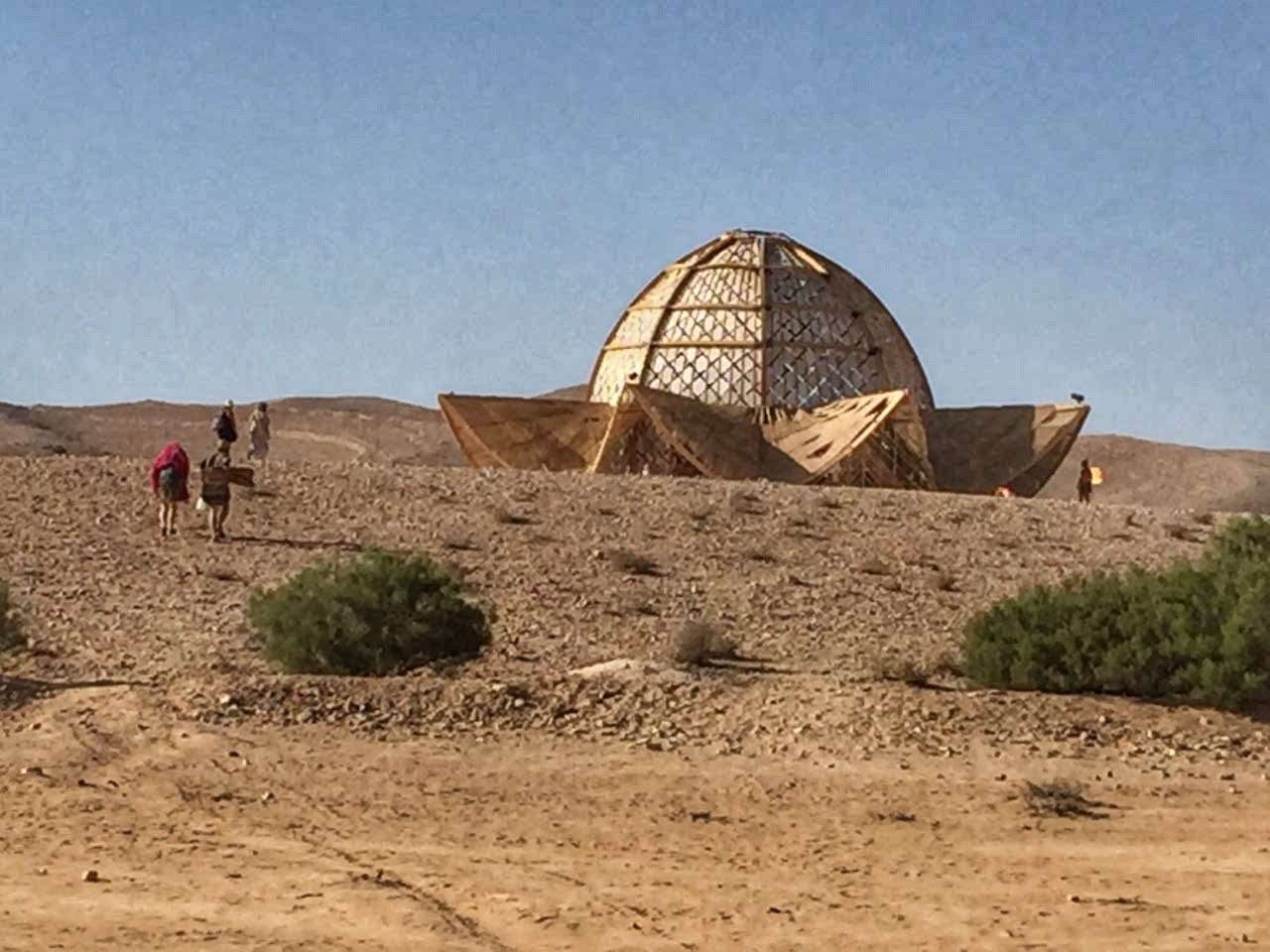
Midburn 2017
