= Sde Boker =

Kibbutz in southern Israel

Sde Boker: שְׂדֵה בּוֹקֵר (Hebrew); سدي بوكير (Arabic)
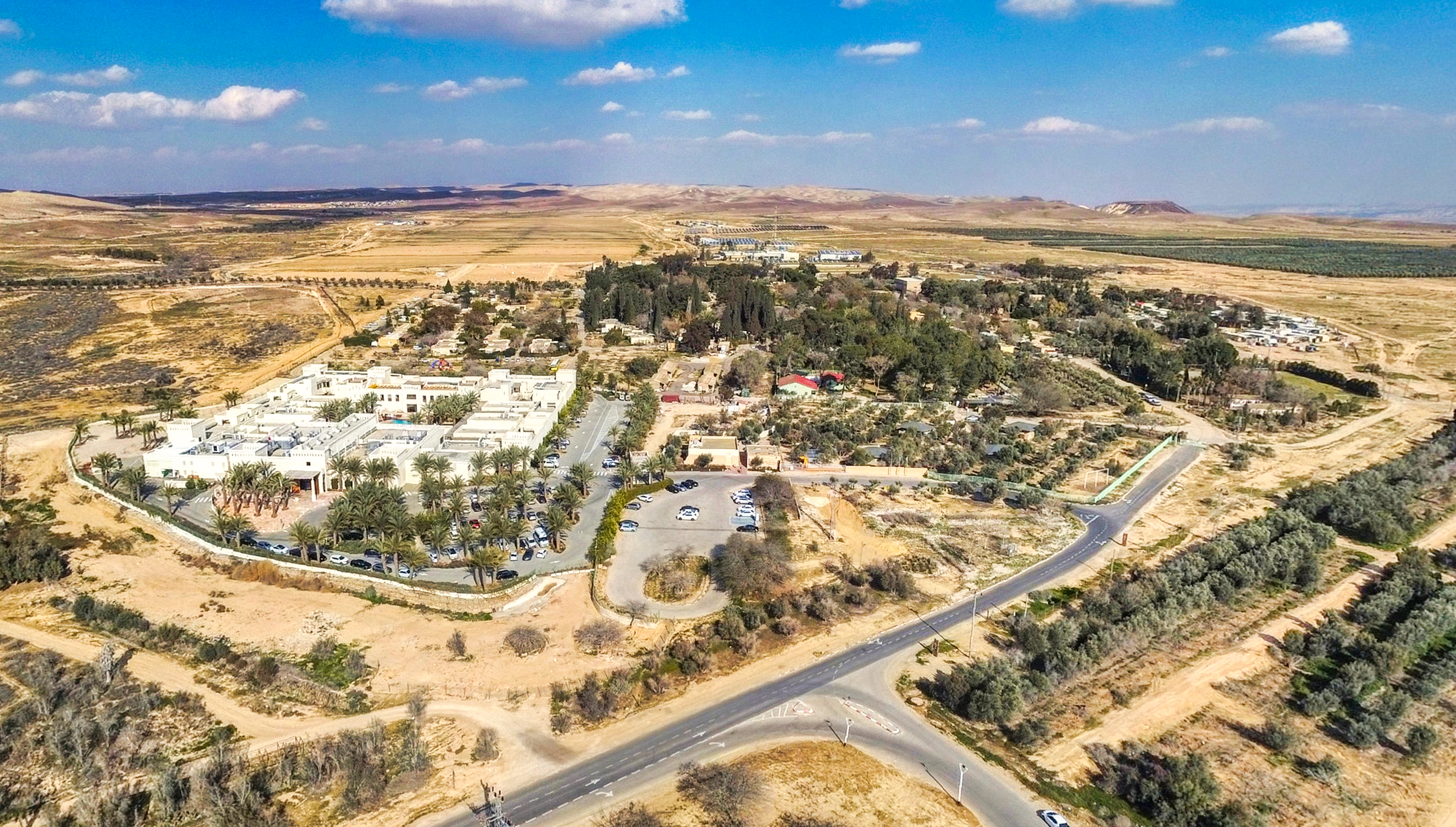
- Etymology: Herding Field
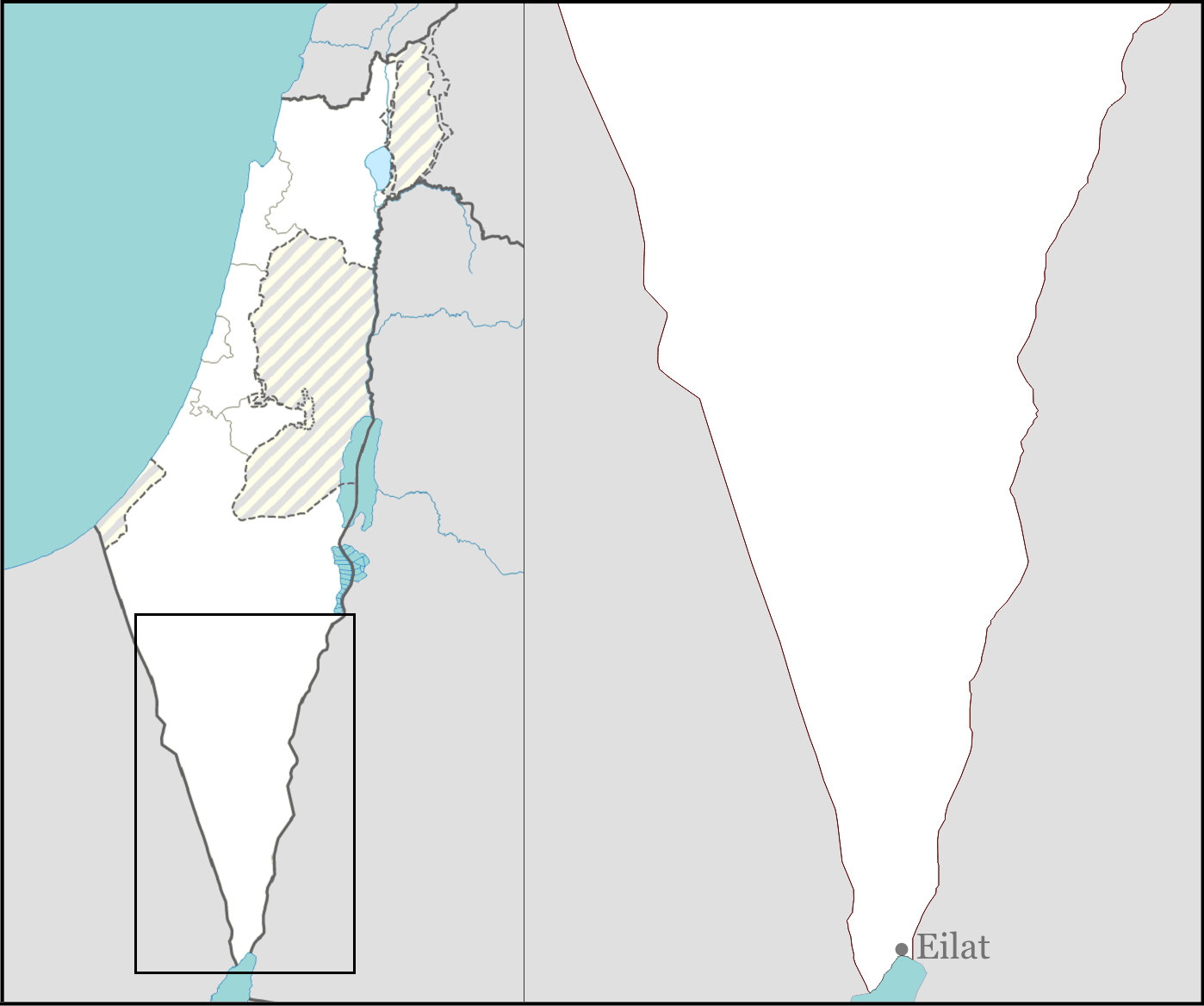
- Location within Southern Negev region of Israel
- Coordinates: 30°52′25″N 34°47′35″E
- Country: Israel
- District: Southern
- Subdistrict: Beersheba
- Council: Ramat HaNegev
- Affiliation: Kibbutz Movement
- Founded: 15 May 1952; 74 years ago
- Founder: Released soldiers
- Population (2024): 554
- Website: www.sde-boker.org.il

Sde Boker (Hebrew: שְׂדֵה בּוֹקֵר, lit. 'Herding Field') is a kibbutz in the Negev desert of southern Israel. The retirement home of Israel's first Prime Minister, David Ben-Gurion, it falls under the jurisdiction of Ramat HaNegev Regional Council. In 2024 it had a population of 554.

== History ==
A large agricultural farm or small village existed here in the early Islamic period, from the late 7th century to the early 9th century. Remains of dozens of structures exist, including a mosque near which hundreds of Arabic inscriptions were found.

The modern kibbutz was established on 15 May 1952 by former soldiers, including Yehoshua Cohen who assassinated United Nations envoys Folke Bernadotte and André Sérot in 1948. In 1953 Prime Minister David Ben-Gurion resigned from office and moved to the kibbutz. Although he returned to politics in 1955, he continued to live in the kibbutz until his death in 1973, when he was buried nearby at Midreshet Ben-Gurion alongside his wife Paula Ben-Gurion. Ben-Gurion moved to the kibbutz inspired by his vision of cultivating the Negev desert and building up its surrounding towns such as Yeruham and Dimona. He believed that eventually the Negev would be home to many Jews who would move to Israel, and he felt that Sde Boker was a trailblazer and example for what should follow. His home was later turned into a museum.

In Ben-Gurion's home is the original study and part of his library, which contains about 5,000 books. From a variety of fields: Judaism, the Hebrew Bible, philosophy, history, geography, military and security. In this room, Ben-Gurion wrote his books and articles, as well as his memoirs.

In his official writings Ben-Gurion often mused about his efforts at rejuvenating the Negev:

The desert provides us with the best opportunity to begin again. This is a vital element of our renaissance in Israel. For it is in mastering nature that man learns to control himself. It is in this sense, more practical than mystic, that I define our Redemption on this land. Israel must continue to cultivate its nationality and to represent the Jewish people without renouncing its glorious past. It must earn this—which is no small task—a right that can only be acquired in the desert. When I looked out my window today and saw a tree standing before me, the sight awoke in me a greater sense of beauty and personal satisfaction than all the forests that I have crossed in Switzerland and Scandinavia. For we planted each tree in this place and watered them with the water we provided at the cost of numerous efforts. Why does a mother love her children so? Because they are her creation. Why does the Jew feel an affinity with Israel? Because everything here must still be accomplished. It depends only on him to participate in this privileged act of creation. The trees at Sde Boker speak to me differently than do the trees planted elsewhere. Not only because I participated in their planting and in their maintenance, but also because they are a gift of man to nature and a gift of the Jews to the compost of their culture.

Sde Boker is also well known for its Bedouin tents. In 2014, it was host to the Midburn festival.

On March 27, 2022, Sde Boker was the site of "the Negev Summit" of foreign ministers from the United States, Bahrain, Morocco, the United Arab Emirates, and Egypt.

== Climate ==
Sde Boker has a hot desert climate (Köppen: BWh), with cool winters and hot summers.

Climate data for Sde Boker (1991–2020)
| Month | Jan | Feb | Mar | Apr | May | Jun | Jul | Aug | Sep | Oct | Nov | Dec | Year |
|---|---|---|---|---|---|---|---|---|---|---|---|---|---|
| Record high °C (°F) | 27.3 (81.1) | 30.9 (87.6) | 36.4 (97.5) | 39.0 (102.2) | 42.2 (108.0) | 41.7 (107.1) | 41.6 (106.9) | 41.1 (106.0) | 43.2 (109.8) | 39.2 (102.6) | 32.5 (90.5) | 29.1 (84.4) | 43.2 (109.8) |
| Mean daily maximum °C (°F) | 15.3 (59.5) | 16.9 (62.4) | 20.5 (68.9) | 25.3 (77.5) | 29.3 (84.7) | 31.8 (89.2) | 33.4 (92.1) | 33.2 (91.8) | 31.1 (88.0) | 27.8 (82.0) | 22.2 (72.0) | 17.3 (63.1) | 25.3 (77.5) |
| Daily mean °C (°F) | 9.9 (49.8) | 11.3 (52.3) | 14.3 (57.7) | 18.1 (64.6) | 21.8 (71.2) | 24.4 (75.9) | 26.2 (79.2) | 26.4 (79.5) | 24.5 (76.1) | 21.4 (70.5) | 16.1 (61.0) | 11.6 (52.9) | 18.8 (65.8) |
| Mean daily minimum °C (°F) | 4.6 (40.3) | 5.6 (42.1) | 8.1 (46.6) | 10.9 (51.6) | 14.3 (57.7) | 16.9 (62.4) | 19.1 (66.4) | 19.5 (67.1) | 17.8 (64.0) | 15.0 (59.0) | 10.0 (50.0) | 5.8 (42.4) | 12.3 (54.1) |
| Record low °C (°F) | −4.5 (23.9) | −1.9 (28.6) | 0.4 (32.7) | 1.3 (34.3) | 7.1 (44.8) | 9.8 (49.6) | 13.0 (55.4) | 14.1 (57.4) | 11.3 (52.3) | 8.0 (46.4) | 0.0 (32.0) | −2.0 (28.4) | −4.5 (23.9) |
| Average precipitation mm (inches) | 26.6 (1.05) | 17.8 (0.70) | 13.6 (0.54) | 4.4 (0.17) | 1.3 (0.05) | 0.4 (0.02) | 0.0 (0.0) | 0.0 (0.0) | 0.0 (0.0) | 5.9 (0.23) | 6.1 (0.24) | 11.2 (0.44) | 87.3 (3.44) |
| Average precipitation days (≥ 1.0 mm) | 3.7 | 3.3 | 2.2 | 0.9 | 0.4 | 0.0 | 0.0 | 0.0 | 0.0 | 0.6 | 1.5 | 2.2 | 14.8 |
Source: NOAA

== Gallery ==
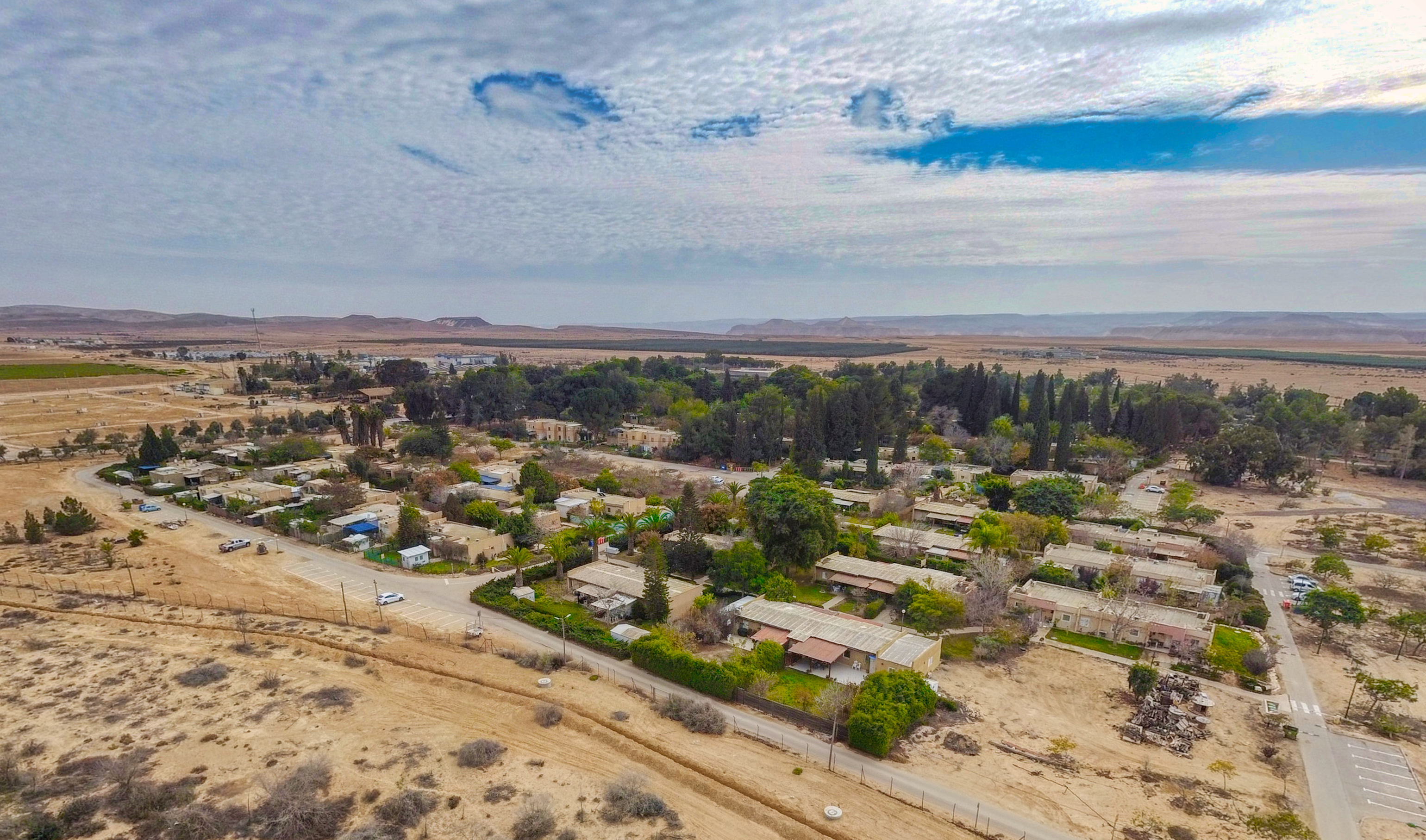
Kibbutz Sde Boker

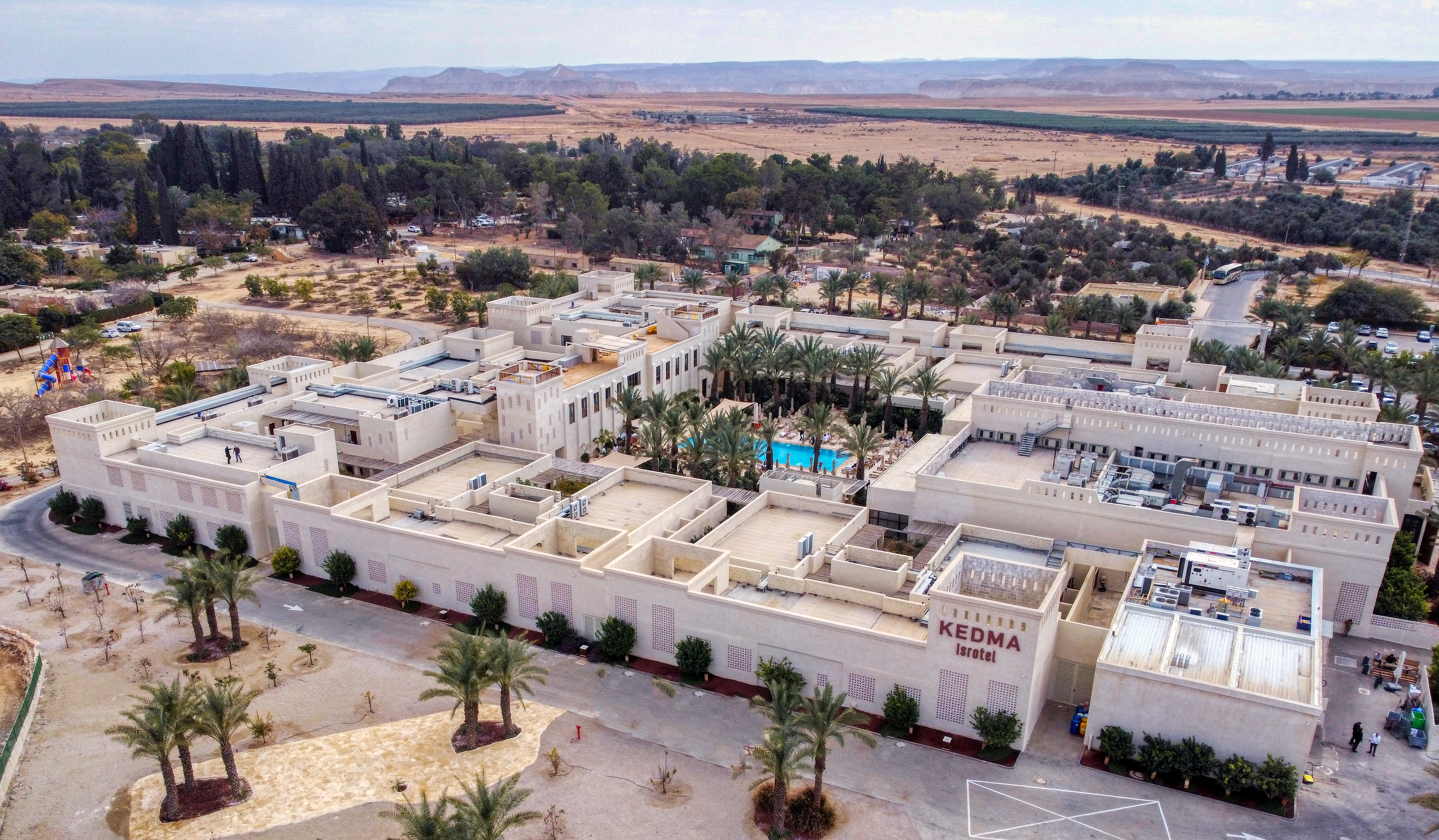
Kedma Hotel in Sde Boker Kibbutz

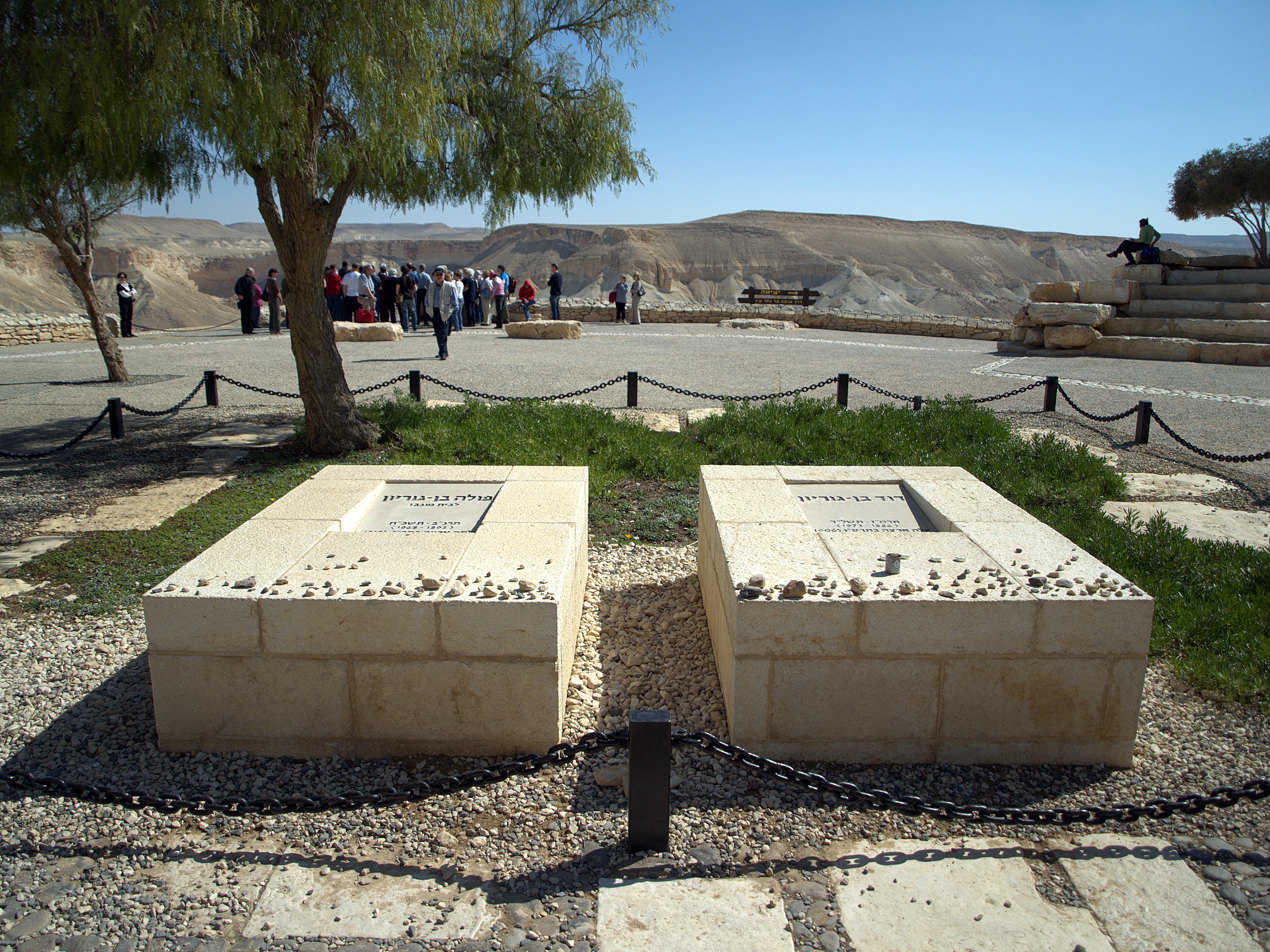
Graves of Paula and David Ben-Gurion in nearby Midreshet Ben Gurion

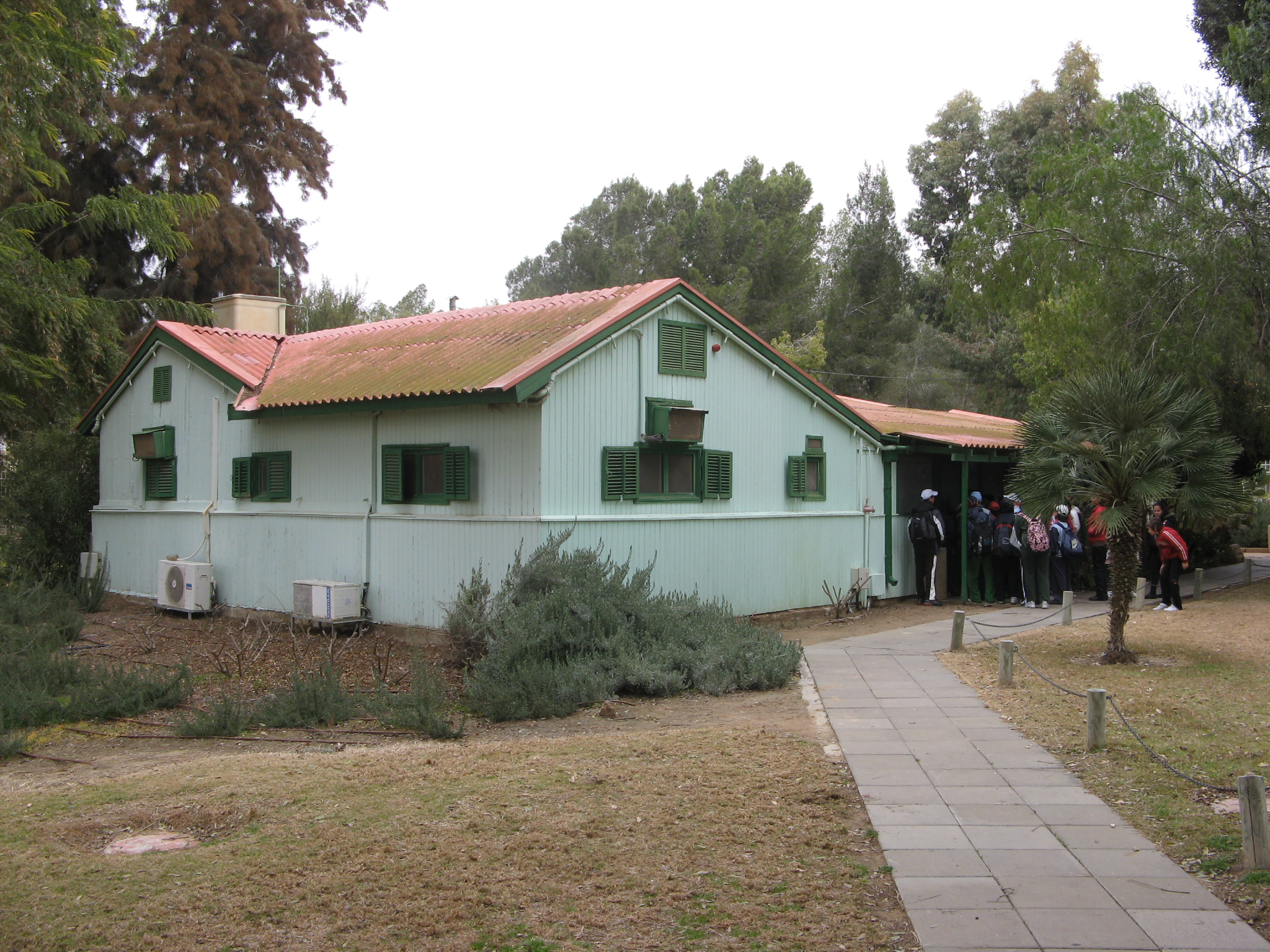
Ben-Gurion's hut: David Ben-Gurion's home on the kibbutz which is now a museum
