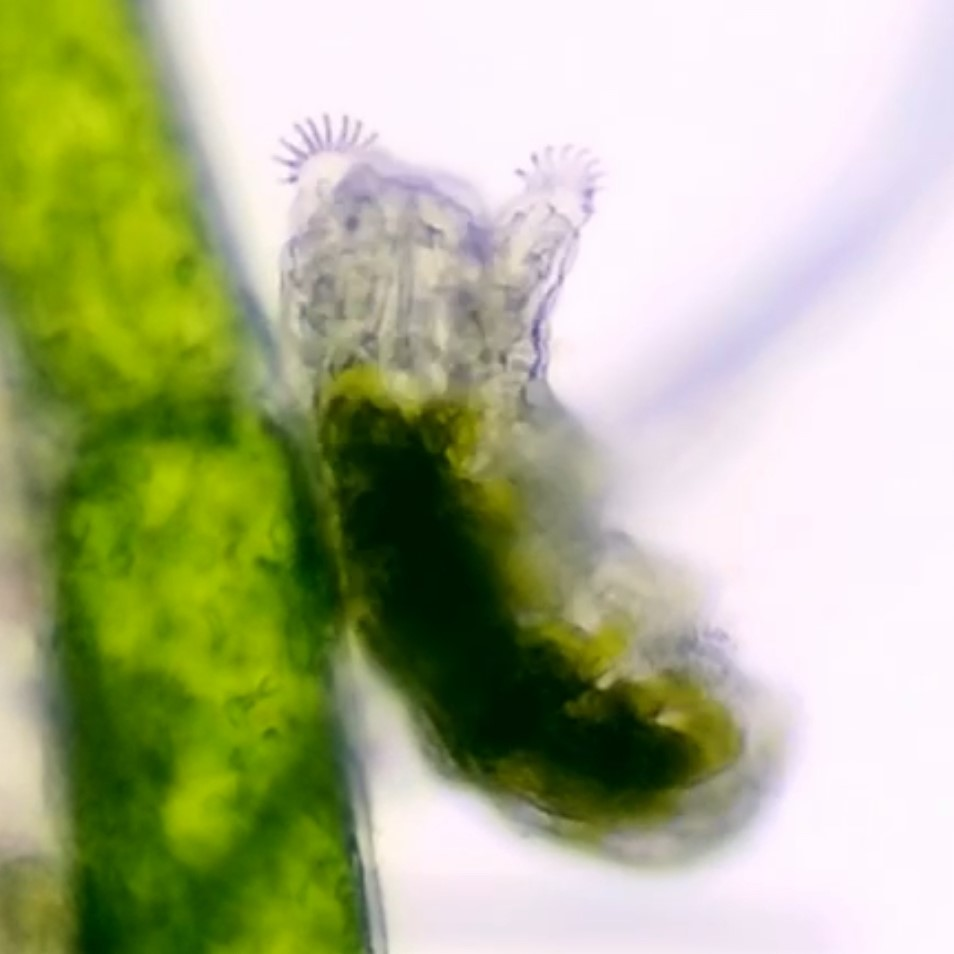

Scientific classification
- Domain: Eukaryota
- Kingdom: Animalia
- Phylum: Tardigrada
- Class: Heterotardigrada
- Order: Echiniscoidea
- Family: Echiniscoididae
- Genus: Echiniscoides
- Species: E. sigismundi

Binomial name
- Echiniscoides sigismundi (M. Schultze, 1865)

Synonyms
- Echiniscus sigismundi M. Schultze, 1865

= Echiniscoides sigismundi =

Species of tardigrade

Echiniscoides sigismundi is a species of marine tardigrade. It lives in seaweeds or plates of barnacles, or more generally in algal strongholds in inter-tidal areas.

== Taxonomy ==
Echiniscoides sigismundi is the type species of Echiniscoides. Described in 1865 as Echiniscus sigismundii, it was placed in a separate genus by Ludwig Hermann Plate in 1888.

== Distribution ==
By 1936, it was reported in most seas of Northern Europe, and in the Mediterranean and the Caribbean.

The Light and Smith Manual describes its distribution as cosmopolitan, in the upper inter-tidal.

== Osmobiosis ==
Echiniscoides sigismundi becomes turgid in freshwater, but can survive up to three days, resuming normal activity as osmotic differential returns to normal.

== Infraspecies ==
- Echiniscoides sigismundi galliensis Kristensen and Hallas, 1980
- Echiniscoides sigismundi groenlandicus Kristensen and Hallas, 1980
- Echiniscoides sigismundi hispaniensis Kristensen and Hallas, 1980
- Echiniscoides sigismundi mediterranicus Kristensen and Hallas, 1980
- Echiniscoides sigismundi polynesiensis Renaud-Mornant, 1976
- Echiniscoides sigismundi porphyrae Grimaldi de Zio, Gallo D'Addabbo and Pietanza, 2000
- Echiniscoides sigismundi sigismundi (M. Schultze, 1865)
- Echiniscoides sigismundi verrucariae Grimaldi de Zio, Gallo D'Addabbo and Pietanza, 2000

== See also ==
- Tardigrada
- Heterotardigrada

== Bibliography ==
- R.O. Schuster, and A. A. Grigarick, 1965. Tardigrada from Western North America With Emphasis on the Fauna of California. University of California Publications in Zoology, vol. 76: 1-67.
- Roberto Guidetti and Roberto Bertolani, 2005. Tardigrade taxonomy: an updated check list of the taxa and a list of characters for their identification. Zootaxa, issue 845: 1-46. Abstract
- Peter Degma, Roberto Bertolani|, Roberto Guidetti, 2010. Actual checklist of Tardigrada species (Ver. 12: 16-04-2010).
- D. J. Crisp and J. Hobart. A note on the habitat of the marine tardigrade Echiniscoides sigismundi (Shultze) (Payment needed for full article) Ann. Mag. Nat. Hist. ser 12, 7: 554-560
- Clive I. Morgan, Philip Ernest King (1976). British Tardigrades, Tardigrada: Keys and Notes for the Identification of the Species. New series, Synopses of the British fauna. Vol. 9. Linnean Society of London. ISBN 978-0-12-506950-2. ISSN 0082-1101.
