= Pseudechiniscus jiroveci =

Scientific classification
- Kingdom: Animalia
- Phylum: Tardigrada
- Class: Heterotardigrada
- Order: Echiniscoidea
- Family: Echiniscidae
- Genus: Pseudechiniscus
- Species: P. jiroveci

Binomial name
- Pseudechiniscus jiroveci Bartoš, 1963

Species of tardigrade

Pseudechiniscus jiroveci is a species of tardigrade within the family Echiniscidae, originally described from 5 juvenile specimens. The species is found in China, with some occurrences recorded from Tanzania and the Republic of South Africa.
