= Bryodelphax meronensis =

Scientific classification
- Kingdom: Animalia
- Phylum: Tardigrada
- Class: Heterotardigrada
- Order: Echiniscoidea
- Family: Echiniscidae
- Genus: Bryodelphax
- Species: B. meronensis

Binomial name
- Bryodelphax meronensis Pilato, Lisi & Binda, 2010

Species of tardigrade

Bryodelphax meronensis is a species of tardigrade in the genus Bryodelphax which belongs to the family Echiniscidae. The species is endemic to Israel and is found in the area of Mount Meron. The species was first described by Giovanni Pilato, Oscar Lisi and Maria Grazia Binda in 2011. The specific name comes from the location where it was discovered.
