= Proechiniscus hanneae =

Scientific classification
- Kingdom: Animalia
- Phylum: Tardigrada
- Class: Heterotardigrada
- Order: Echiniscoidea
- Family: Echiniscidae
- Genus: Proechiniscus; Kristensen, 1987
- Species: P. hanneae

Binomial name
- Proechiniscus hanneae (Petersen, 1951)

Synonyms
- Pseudechiniscus hanneae Petersen, 1951

Species of tardigrade

Proechiniscus hanneae is a species of tardigrade. It is the only species of Proechiniscus, a genus within the family Echiniscidae.

The species is endemic to Greenland, where it occurs on Disko Island.

The species was first described as Pseudechiniscus hanneae by Børge Petersen in 1951. It was placed in the new genus of Proechiniscus by Reinhardt Møbjerg Kristensen in 1987.
