= Hypechiniscus fengi =

Scientific classification
- Kingdom: Animalia
- Phylum: Tardigrada
- Class: Heterotardigrada
- Order: Echiniscoidea
- Family: Echiniscidae
- Genus: Hypechiniscus
- Species: H. fengi

Binomial name
- Hypechiniscus fengi Sun & Li, 2013

Species of tardigrade

Hypechiniscus fengi is a species of tardigrade within the family Echiniscidae, described in China by Xizhai Sun and Xiaochen Li. It was compared to other members within its genus, H. exarmatus, H. gladiator, and H. papillifer. Differentiations between the species are; H. fengi having a more robust medium dorsal spine and larger spurs on the internal claws when compared to H. exarmatus; H. fengi lacking a dentate collar on the fourth pair of legs when compared to H. gladiator; and H.fengi lacking papillae on all four pairs of legs when compared to H. papillifer.
