= Echiniscus clavispinosus =

Scientific classification
- Kingdom: Animalia
- Phylum: Tardigrada
- Class: Heterotardigrada
- Order: Echiniscoidea
- Family: Echiniscidae
- Genus: Echiniscus
- Species: E. clavispinosus

Binomial name
- Echiniscus clavispinosus Fontoura, Pilato & Lisi (2011)

Species of tardigrade

Echinscus clavispinosus is a species of tardigrade in the family Echiniscidae. The species is endemic to the Cape Verde Islands and is found only in the island of Santo Antão. The species was first described by Paulo Fontoura, Giovanni Pilato, and Oscar Lisi in 2011.
