= Multipseudechiniscus =

Scientific classification
- Kingdom: Animalia
- Phylum: Tardigrada
- Class: Heterotardigrada
- Order: Echiniscoidea
- Family: Echiniscidae
- Genus: Multipseudechiniscus; Schulte & Miller, 2011
- Species: M. raneyi

Binomial name
- Multipseudechiniscus raneyi (Grigarick, Mihelčič & Schuster, 1964)

Synonyms
- Pseudechiniscus raneyi Grigarick, Mihelčič & Schuste, 1964

Species of tardigrade

Multipseudechiniscus raneyi is a species of tardigrade. It is the only species of Multipseudechiniscus, a genus within the family Echiniscidae.

The species was first described as Pseudechiniscus raneyi by Albert A. Grigarick, Franc Mihelčič & Robert O. Schuster in 1964. It was placed in the new genus Multipseudechiniscus in 2011. The species occurs in the western United States, in the states of California, Oregon and Montana.
