= Mopsechiniscus franciscae =

Scientific classification
- Domain: Eukaryota
- Kingdom: Animalia
- Phylum: Tardigrada
- Class: Heterotardigrada
- Order: Echiniscoidea
- Family: Echiniscidae
- Genus: Mopsechiniscus
- Species: M. franciscae

Binomial name
- Mopsechiniscus franciscae Guidetti et al., 2014

Species of tardigrade

Mopsechiniscus franciscae is a species of tardigrade native to Antarctica. One of the most resilient species on Earth, it can survive conditions such as extreme temperatures, high pressure, poison, dehydration, radioactivity, and even vacuum, partly due to its ability to go into hibernation when deprived of water. Found in samples of moss growing on gravel along the shore of Victoria Land, the species has a reddish color, the gut can appear green after feeding. Males measure a quarter of a millimeter in length, and females are 50 percent larger.
