= Echiniscus azoricus =

Scientific classification
- Kingdom: Animalia
- Phylum: Tardigrada
- Class: Heterotardigrada
- Order: Echiniscoidea
- Family: Echiniscidae
- Genus: Echiniscus
- Species: E. azoricus

Binomial name
- Echiniscus azoricus Fontoura, Pilato & Lisi, 2008

Species of tardigrade

Echinscus azoricus is a species of tardigrade in the family Echiniscidae. The species is endemic to the Azores Islands. The species was first described by Paulo Fontoura, Giovanni Pilato and Oscar Lisi in 2008.
