= Echiniscus madonnae =

Scientific classification
- Kingdom: Animalia
- Phylum: Tardigrada
- Class: Heterotardigrada
- Order: Echiniscoidea
- Family: Echiniscidae
- Genus: Echiniscus
- Species: E. madonnae

Binomial name
- Echiniscus madonnae Michalczyk & Kaczmarek, 2006

Species of tardigrade

Echiniscus madonnae is a tardigrade species, in the family Echiniscidae. It was described by Polish zoologists Łukasz Michalczyk and Łukasz Kaczmarek from moss samples collected in Peru in 2006, and named in honor of American singer-songwriter Madonna.

== Etymology ==
Echiniscus madonnae was described by Polish zoologists Michalczyk and Kaczmarek Łukasz and published in the international journal of animal taxonomy Zootaxa in March 2006. The species was named in honor of American singer Madonna. The scientists stated: "We take great pleasure in dedicating this species to one of the most significant artists of our times, Madonna Louise Veronica Ritchie".

It was subsequently transferred in 2019 to newly created genus Barbaria, which is named after Polish zoologist Barbara Węglarska.

== Description ==
So far it is the only species within the Echiniscus bigranulatus group that does not have true pores in the dorsal plate cuticle.

== Habitat ==
Apart from its type locality in Peru, Echiniscus madonnae is also found in Chile (Ancash, near Huaraz), mainly mosses on rocks and in Colombia (Magdalena and Sierra Nevada de Santa Marta), in lichen of sub-andean forests. This species belongs to a Neotropical and Antarctic bigranulatus group.

== See also ==
- List of organisms named after famous people (born 1950–1974)
