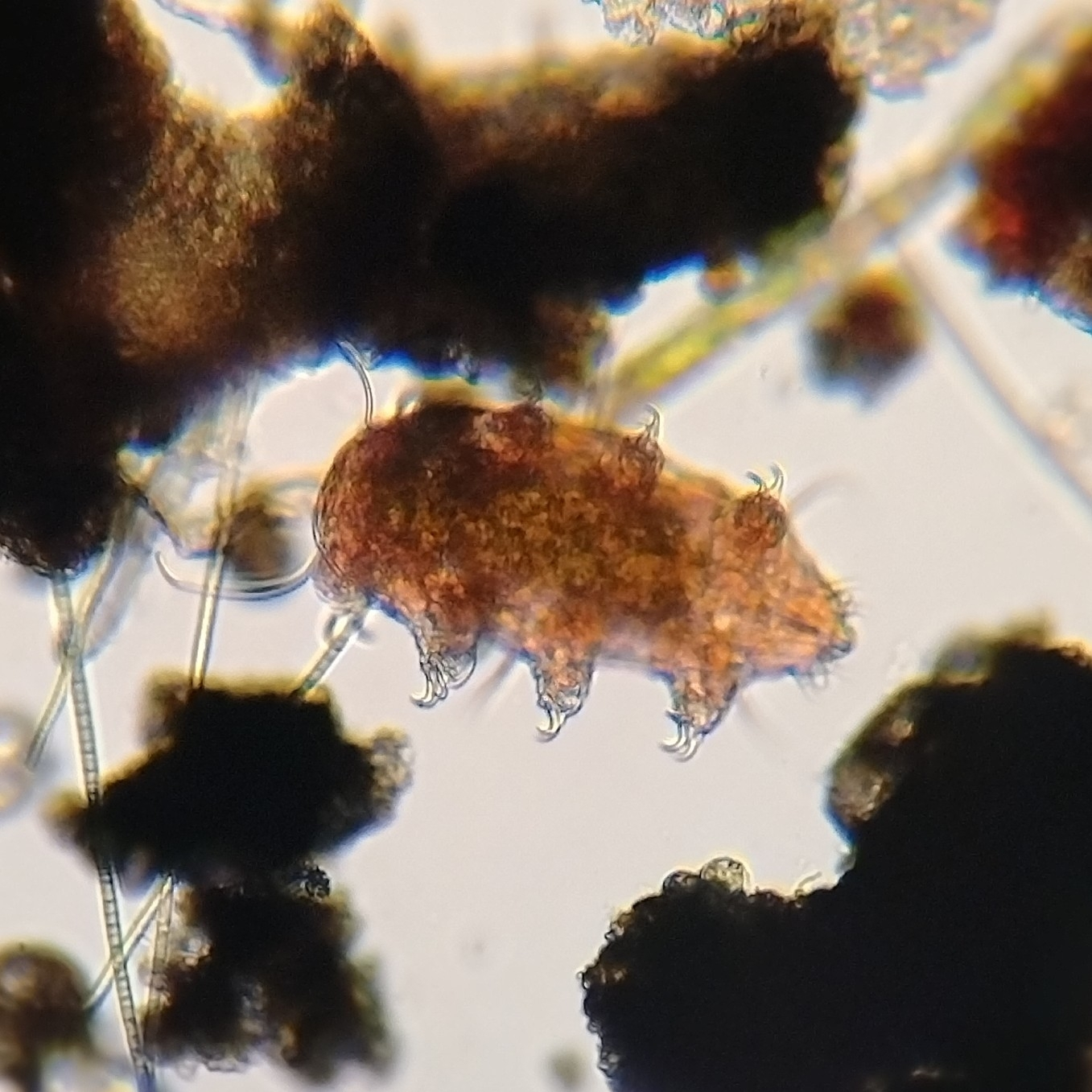

Scientific classification
- Kingdom: Animalia
- Phylum: Tardigrada
- Class: Heterotardigrada
- Order: Echiniscoidea
- Family: Echiniscidae
- Genus: Echiniscus
- Species: E. testudo

Binomial name
- Echiniscus testudo (Doyère, 1840)

Synonyms
- Emydium testudo Doyère, 1840; Echiniscus bellermanni Schultze, 1840; Echiniscus inermis Richters, 1902; Echiniscus trifilis Rahm, 1921; Echiniscus filamentosus mongoliensis Iharos, 1973

= Echiniscus testudo =

Species of tardigrade

Echiniscus testudo is a cosmopolitan species of tardigrade.

== Taxonomy ==
The species was described by Louis Michel François Doyère in 1840; he placed it in the genus Emydium.

G. Ramazzotti and W. Maucci classified E. filamentos mongoliensis Iharos, 1973 as a synonym of E. testudo in 1983; this was followed by other tardigradologists. In 2017, Piotr Gąsiorek and colleagues restored it as a distinct taxon and elevated it to species level: E. mongoliensis.

Gąsiorek and colleagues also classified E. filamentosus Plate, 1888 and E. glaber Bartoš, 1937 as junior synonyms of E. testudo.

== Distribution ==
It is found throughout most of the Palaearctic, and has been recorded in all continents except Antarctica and Australia. Most reports are Holarctic. Locations where it has been recorded include: Denmark, Egypt, the Faroe Islands, France, Germany, Greece, Greenland, Israel, Italy, Morocco, Iberia, Mongolia, and China.

Doyère based his description off specimens collected in Paris. The neotype designated by Gąsiorek and colleagues was collected in Paris's Montmartre Cemetery. The type localities of the junior synonyms E. bellermanni and E. inermis are both in Germany: the former is Greifswald, and the latter is the Taunus mountains near Frankfurt.

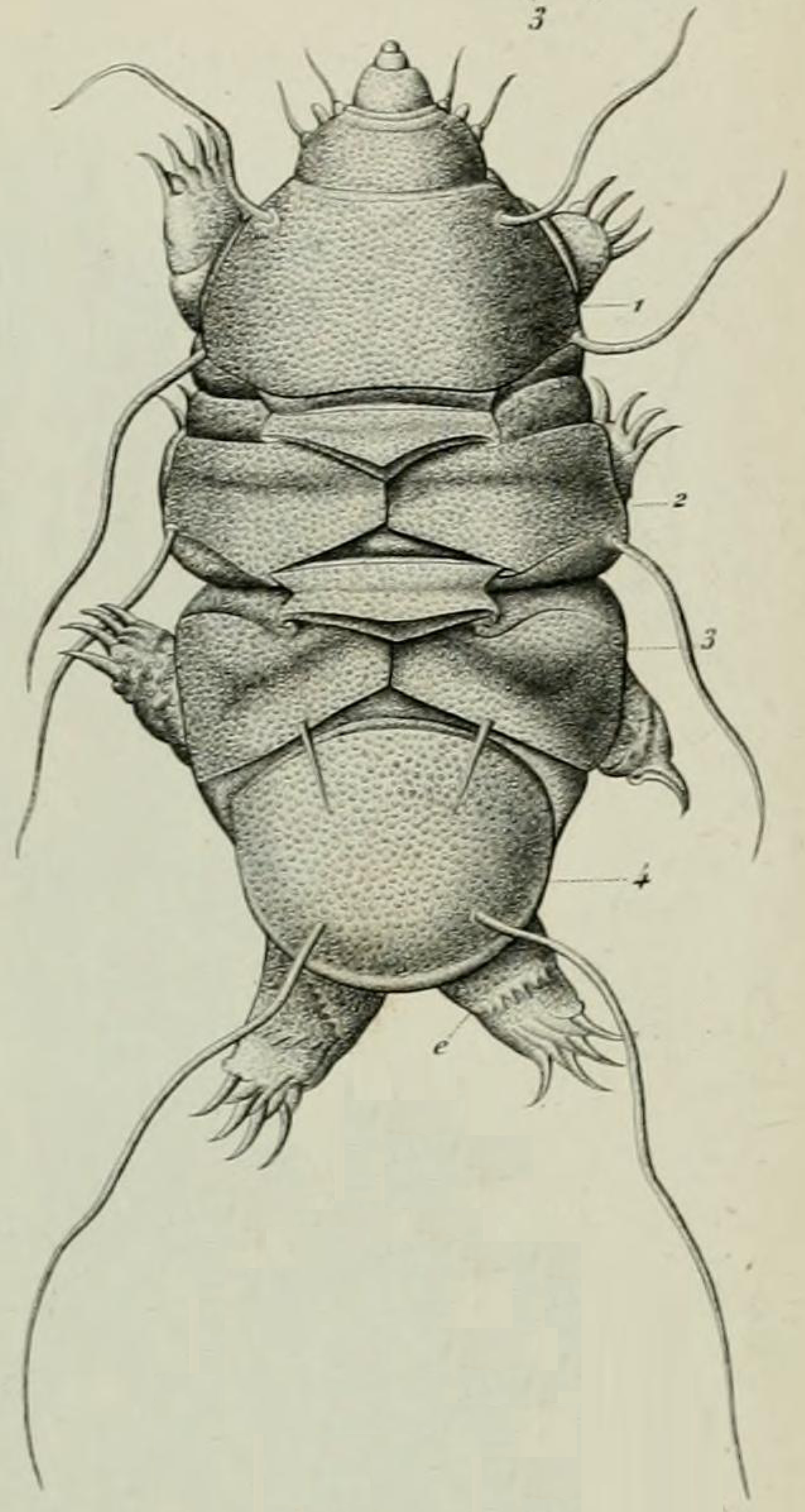
Dorsal view, showing its four segmented bands
