= Echiniscus viridianus =

Scientific classification
- Kingdom: Animalia
- Phylum: Tardigrada
- Class: Heterotardigrada
- Order: Echiniscoidea
- Family: Echiniscidae
- Genus: Echiniscus
- Species: E. viridianus

Binomial name
- Echiniscus viridianus Pilato, Fontoura & Lisi, 2007

Species of tardigrade

Echinscus viridianus is a species of tardigrade in the family Echiniscidae. The species has been found in the United States (Alabama and New Mexico) and in the Azores Islands in the North Atlantic. It was first described by Giovanni Pilato, Paulo Fontoura and Oscar Lisi in 2007. The body length of Echiniscus viridianus lies between 175 and 310 μm.
