= Pseudechiniscus santomensis =

Scientific classification
- Kingdom: Animalia
- Phylum: Tardigrada
- Class: Heterotardigrada
- Order: Echiniscoidea
- Family: Echiniscidae
- Genus: Pseudechiniscus
- Species: P. santomensis

Binomial name
- Pseudechiniscus santomensis Fontoura, Pilato & Lisi, 2010

Species of tardigrade

Pseudechiniscus is a species of tardigrade in the family Echiniscidae. The species is endemic to the island of São Tomé in São Tomé and Príncipe. The species was first described by Paulo Fontoura, Giovanni Pilato and Oscar Lisi in 2010.

== Description ==
This tardigrade species measures between 119 and 168 μm.
