= Mesotardigrada =

- Illustration accompanying Rahm's (1937) description

Scientific classification
- Kingdom: Animalia
- Phylum: Tardigrada
- Class: Mesotardigrada
- Order: Thermozodia
- Family: Thermozodiidae; Rahm, 1937
- Genus: Thermozodium; Rahm, 1937
- Species: T. esakii

Binomial name
- Thermozodium esakii Rahm, 1937
- Mesotardigrada (Japan)
- The type locality and only locality of observation, near Nagasaki, Japan

Dubious class of tardigrades

Mesotardigrada is one of three classes of tardigrades, consisting of a single species, Thermozodium esakii. The animal reportedly has six claws of equal length at each foot. This species was described in 1937 by German zoologist Gilbert Rahm from a hot spring near Nagasaki, Japan. The inability of taxonomists to replicate Rahm's finding has cast doubt on the accuracy of the description, making T. esakii, and by extension the entire class Mesotardigrada, a taxon inquirendum.

== Taxonomic ambiguity ==
The type specimen Rahm used as the basis of his description has either been lost or it was never preserved in the first place, which Grothman et al. (2017) suggest is consistent with the lax taxonomic standards of the 1930s. Thus, re-examination of the original specimen is not possible. Complicating matters further, the type locality from which Rahm collected his specimen may have been destroyed by an earthquake and subsequent searches for additional specimens matching the original description have been unsuccessful.

Grothman et al. (2017) suggest that Rahm might have observed and misinterpreted a species in the class Heterotardigrada, possibly belonging to the genus Carphania or Oreella.

== See also ==
- Monoblastozoa – another high rank taxon whose sole member has not been independently verified to exist
