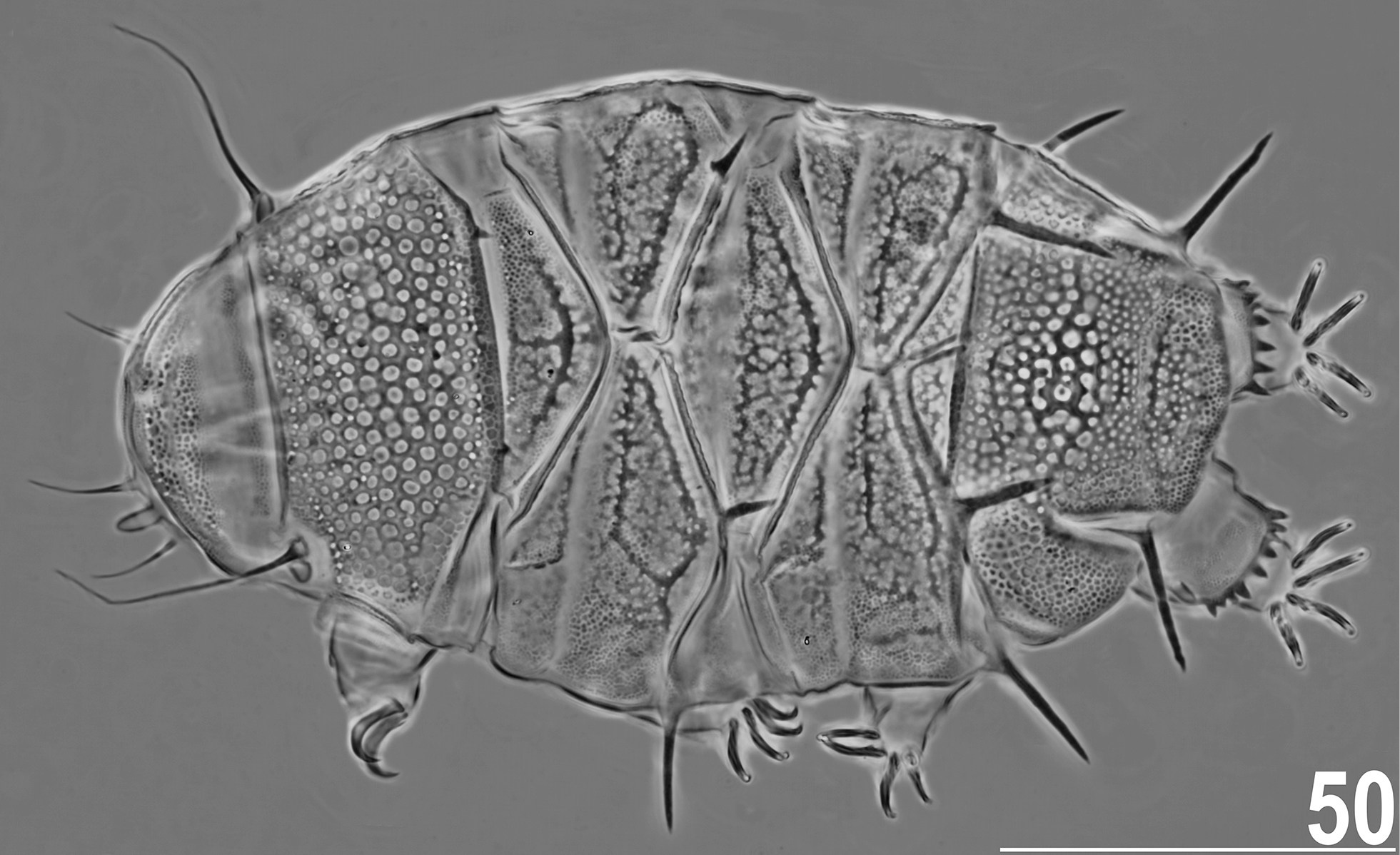

Scientific classification
- Domain: Eukaryota
- Kingdom: Animalia
- Phylum: Tardigrada
- Class: Heterotardigrada
- Order: Echiniscoidea
- Family: Echiniscidae
- Genus: Echiniscus
- Species: E. africanus

Binomial name
- Echiniscus africanus Murray, 1907

= Echiniscus africanus =

Species of tardigrade

Echiniscus africanus is a species of tardigrade in the family Echiniscidae. The species is found in Africa.
