= Novechiniscus armadilloides =

Scientific classification
- Kingdom: Animalia
- Phylum: Tardigrada
- Class: Heterotardigrada
- Order: Echiniscoidea
- Family: Echiniscidae
- Genus: Novechiniscus; Kristensen, 1987
- Species: N. armadilloides

Binomial name
- Novechiniscus armadilloides (Schuster, 1975)

Synonyms
- Parechiniscus armadilloides Schuster, 1975

Species of tardigrade

Novechiniscus armadilloides is a species of terrestrial tardigrade. It is the only species of the genus Novechiniscus, which belongs to the family Echiniscidae. The species is endemic to the United States in the state of Utah.

The species was first described by Robert O. Schuster in 1975 as Parechiniscus armadilloides. It was placed in its own genus Novechiniscus by Reinhardt Møbjerg Kristensen in 1987.
