= Parechiniscus =

Scientific classification
- Kingdom: Animalia
- Phylum: Tardigrada
- Class: Heterotardigrada
- Order: Echiniscoidea
- Family: Echiniscidae
- Genus: Parechiniscus; Cuénot, 1926

Genus of tardigrades

Parechiniscus is a monotypic genus of tardigrades in the family Echiniscidae. It was named and described by Lucien Cuénot in 1926. It's only species is Parechiniscus chitonides.
