= Echiniscus =

Scientific classification
- Domain: Eukaryota
- Kingdom: Animalia
- Phylum: Tardigrada
- Class: Heterotardigrada
- Order: Echiniscoidea
- Family: Echiniscidae
- Genus: Echiniscus; Schultze, 1840

Synonyms
- Emydium Doyère, 1840

Genus of tardigrades

Echiniscus is a genus of tardigrades in the family Echiniscidae. The genus was named and described by Karl August Sigismund Schultze in 1840.

== Species ==
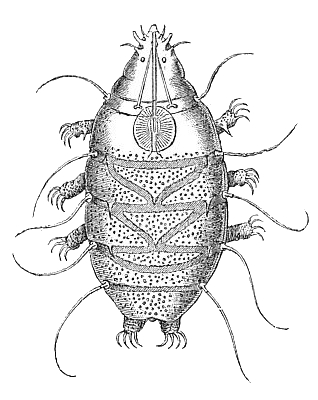
Echiniscus spinulosis Doyère, 1840

The genus includes the following species:

- Echiniscus africanus Murray, 1907
- Echiniscus aliquantillus Grigarick, Schuster & Nelson, 1983
- Echiniscus angolensis da Cunha & do Nascimento Ribeiro, 1964
- Echiniscus apuanus Bertolani, 1946
- Echiniscus arcangelii Maucci, 1973–74
- Echiniscus arctomys Ehrenberg, 1853
- Echiniscus arthuri Pilato, Binda & Lisi, 2005
- Echiniscus azoricus Fontoura, Pilato & Lisi, 2008
- Echiniscus baius Marcus, 1928
- Echiniscus baloghi Iharos, 1973
- Echiniscus barbarae Kaczmarek & Michalczyk, 2002
- Echiniscus batramiae Iharos, 1936
- Echiniscus becki Schuster & Grigarick, 1966
- Echiniscus bigranulatus Richters, 1907
- Echiniscus bisculptus Maucci, 1983
- Echiniscus blumi Richters, 1903
- Echiniscus calcaratus Richters, 1908
- Echiniscus calvus Marcus, 1931
- Echiniscus canadensis Murray, 1910
- Echiniscus canedoi da Cunha & do Nascimento Ribeiro, 1962
- Echiniscus capillatus Ramazzotti, 1956
- Echiniscus carsicus Mihelčič, 1966
- Echiniscus carusoi Pilato, 1972
- Echiniscus cavagnaroi Schuster & Grigarick, 1966
- Echiniscus cervicornis Murray, 1906
- Echiniscus charrua Claps & Rossi, 1997
- Echiniscus cheonyoungi Moon & Kim, 1994
- Echiniscus cirinoi Binda & Pilato, 1993
- Echiniscus clavispinosus Fontoura, Pilato & Lisi, 2011
- Echiniscus clevelandi Beasley, 1999
- Echiniscus columinis Murray, 1911
- Echiniscus corrugicaudatus McInnes, 2009
- Echiniscus crassispinosus Murray, 1907
- Echiniscus crebraclava Sun, Li & Feng, 2014
- Echiniscus curiosus Claxton, 1996
- Echiniscus danieli Meyer, Tsaliki & Sorgee, 2017
- Echiniscus dariae Kaczmarek & Michalczyk, 2010
- Echiniscus darienae Miller, Horning & Dastych, 1995
- Echiniscus dearmatus Bartoš, 1935
- Echiniscus dikenli Maucci, 1973
- Echiniscus diploglyptus Durante Pasa & Maucci, 1975
- Echiniscus divergens Marcus, 1936
- Echiniscus dreyfusi de Barros, 1942
- Echiniscus duboisi Richters, 1902
- Echiniscus egnatiae Durante Pasa & Maucci, 1979
- Echiniscus ehrenbergi Dastych & Kristensen, 1995
- Echiniscus elaeinae Pilato, Binda & Lisi, 2005
- Echiniscus elegans Richters, 1907
- Echiniscus evelinae de Barros, 1942
- Echiniscus ganczareki Michalczyk & Kaczmarek, 2007
- Echiniscus granulatus (Doyère, 1840)
- Echiniscus heterospinosus Maucci, 1954
- Echiniscus hexacanthus Maucci, 1973
- Echiniscus hoonsooi Moon & Kim, 1990
- Echiniscus horningi Schuster & Grigarick, 1971
- Echiniscus inocelatus Mihelčič, 1938
- Echiniscus insuetus Mihelčič, 1967
- Echiniscus jagodici Mihelčič, 1951
- Echiniscus jamesi Claxton, 1996
- Echiniscus japonicus Morikawa, 1951
- Echiniscus jenningsi Dastych, 1984
- Echiniscus kerguelensis Richters, 1904
- Echiniscus knowltoni Schuster & Grigarick, 1971
- Echiniscus kofordi Schuster & Grigarick, 1966
- Echiniscus kosickii Kaczmarek & Michalczyk, 2010
- Echiniscus lapponicus Thulin, 1911
- Echiniscus laterosetosus Ito, 1993
- Echiniscus laterospinosus Rudescu, 1964
- Echiniscus latifasciatus Dudichev & Biserov, 2000
- Echiniscus lentiferus Claxton & Dastych, 2017
- Echiniscus lichenorum Maucci, 1983
- Echiniscus limai da Cunha & do Nascimento Ribeiro, 1964
- Echiniscus lineatus Pilato, Fontoura, Lisi & Beasley, 2008
- Echiniscus longispinosus Murray, 1907
- Echiniscus loxophthalmus Richters, 1911
- Echiniscus madonnae Michalczyk & Kaczmarek, 2006
- Echiniscus maesi Séméria, 1985
- Echiniscus malpighii Biserov, 1994
- Echiniscus manuelae da Cunha & do Nascimento Ribeiro, 1962
- Echiniscus marcusi Pilato, Claxton & Binda, 1989
- Echiniscus marginatus Binda & Pilato, 1994
- Echiniscus marginoporus Grigarick, Schuster & Nelson, 1983
- Echiniscus markezi Mihelčič, 1971/72
- Echiniscus marleyi Li, 2007
- Echiniscus masculinus Gąsiorek, Vončina & Michalczyk, 2020
- Echiniscus mauccii Ramazzotti, 1956
- Echiniscus mediantus Marcus, 1930
- Echiniscus merokensis Richters, 1904
- Echiniscus migiurtinus Franceschi, 1957
- Echiniscus mihelcici Iharos, 1973
- Echiniscus militaris Murray, 1911
- Echiniscus molluscorum Fox & Garcia-Moll, 1962
- Echiniscus mongoliensis Iharos, 1973
- Echiniscus moniliatus Iharos, 1967
- Echiniscus montanus Iharos, 1982
- Echiniscus mosaicus Grigarick, Schuster & Nelson, 1983
- Echiniscus murrayi Iharos, 1969
- Echiniscus nelsonae Li, Wang & Yu, 2007
- Echiniscus nepalensis Dastych, 1975
- Echiniscus nigripustulus Horning, Schuster & Grigarick, 1978
- Echiniscus nobilis Mihelčič, 1967
- Echiniscus ollantaytamboensis Nickel, Miller & Marley, 2001
- Echiniscus osellai Maucci, 1975
- Echiniscus pajstunensis Bartoš,1941
- Echiniscus palmai Dastych, 1997
- Echiniscus pardalis Degma & Schill, 2015
- Echiniscus perarmatus Murray, 1907
- Echiniscus peruvianus Binda & Pilato, 1994
- Echiniscus perviridis Ramazzotti, 1959
- Echiniscus phocae du Bois-Reymond Marcus, 1944
- Echiniscus polygonalis Ito, 1993
- Echiniscus pooensis Rodriguez-Roda, 1948
- Echiniscus porabrus Horning, Schuster & Grigarick, 1978
- Echiniscus postojnensis Mihelčič, 1967
- Echiniscus pseudelegans Séméria, 1994
- Echiniscus pseudowendti Dastych, 1984
- Echiniscus punctus McInnes, 1995
- Echiniscus pusae Marcus, 1928
- Echiniscus quadrispinosus Richters, 1902
- Echiniscus quitensis Pilato, 2007
- Echiniscus rackae Dastych, 1986
- Echiniscus ranzii Ramazzotti, 1964
- Echiniscus reticulatus Murray, 1905
- Echiniscus reymondi Marcus, 1928
- Echiniscus robertsi Schuster & Grigarick, 1965
- Echiniscus rodnae Claxton, 1996
- Echiniscus rufoviridis du Bois-Reymond Marcus, 1944
- Echiniscus rugospinosus Marcus, 1928
- Echiniscus scabrospinosus Fontoura, 1982
- Echiniscus semifoveolatus Ito, 1993
- Echiniscus shaanxiensis Li, Wang & Yu, 2007
- Echiniscus siegristi Heinis, 1911
- Echiniscus simba Marcus, 1928
- Echiniscus speciosus Mihelčič, 1967
- Echiniscus spiculifer Schaudinn, 1901
- Echiniscus spiniger Richters, 1904
- Echiniscus spinulosus (Doyère, 1840)
- Echiniscus storkani Bartoš, 1940
- Echiniscus sylvanus Murray, 1910
- Echiniscus taibaiensis Wang & Li, 2005
- Echiniscus tamus Mehlen, 1969
- Echiniscus tardus Mihelčič, 1951
- Echiniscus tenuis Marcus, 1928
- Echiniscus tessellatus Murray, 1910
- Echiniscus testudo (Doyère, 1840)
- Echiniscus trisetosus Cuénot, 1932
- Echiniscus trojanus Maucci, 1973
- Echiniscus tropicalis Binda & Pilato, 1995
- Echiniscus tympanista Murray, 1911
- Echiniscus velaminis Murray, 1910
- Echiniscus vinculus Horning, Schuster & Grigarick, 1978
- Echiniscus virginicus Riggin, 1962
- Echiniscus viridianus Pilato, Fontoura & Lisi, 2007
- Echiniscus viridis Murray, 1910
- Echiniscus viridissimus Péterfi, 1956
- Echiniscus walteri Pilato & Lisi, 2003
- Echiniscus weisseri Maucci, 1978
- Echiniscus wendti Richters, 1903
- Echiniscus zetotrymus Horning, Schuster & Grigarick, 1978

Species brought into synonymy

- Echiniscus intermedius Murray, 1910: synonym of Bryochoerus intermedius Marcus, 1936
