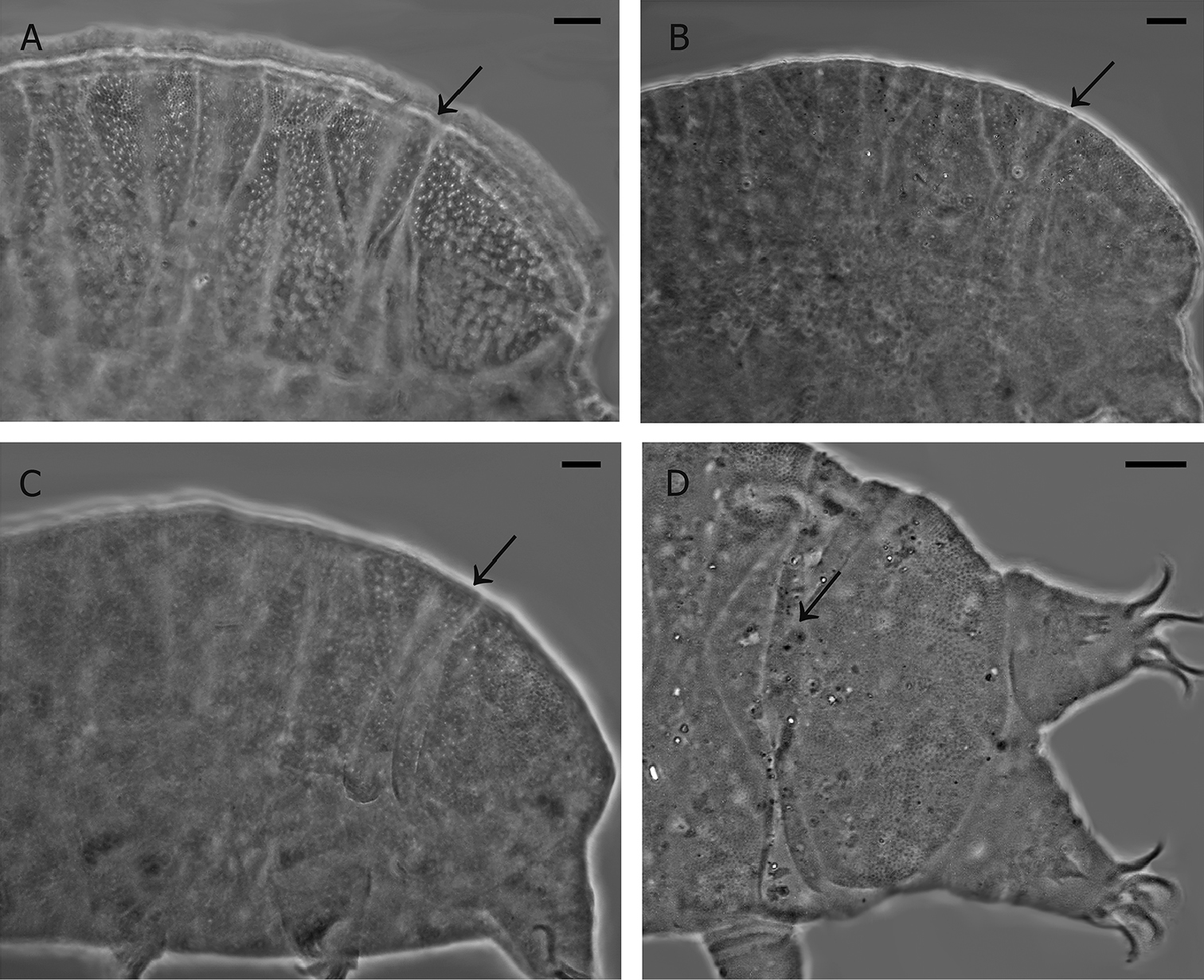

Scientific classification
- Kingdom: Animalia
- Phylum: Tardigrada
- Class: Heterotardigrada
- Order: Echiniscoidea
- Family: Echiniscidae
- Genus: Bryodelphax; Thulin, 1928

= Bryodelphax =

Genus of tardigrades

Bryodelphax is a genus of tardigrades in the family Echiniscidae. The genus was first described by Gustav Thulin in 1928.

== Species ==
The genus includes the following species:

- Bryodelphax aaseae Kristensen, Michalczyk & Kaczmarek, 2010
- Bryodelphax alzirae (du Bois-Reymond Marcus, 1944)
- Bryodelphax amphoterus (Durante Pasa & Maucci, 1975)
- Bryodelphax arenosus Gąsiorek, 2018
- Bryodelphax asiaticus Kaczmarek & Michalczyk, 2004
- Bryodelphax atlantis Fontoura, Pilato & Lisi, 2008
- Bryodelphax australasiaticus Gąsiorek, Vončina, Degma & Michalczyk, 2020
- Bryodelphax beniowskii Bartylak, Kayastha, Roszkowska & Kaczmarek, 2022
- Bryodelphax brevidentatus Kaczmarek, Michalczyk & Degma, 2005
- Bryodelphax crossotus Grigarick, Schuster & Nelson, 1983
- Bryodelphax decoratus Gąsiorek, Vončina, Degma & Michalczyk, 2020
- Bryodelphax dominicanus (Schuster & Toftner, 1982)
- Bryodelphax instabilis Gąsiorek & Degma, 2018
- Bryodelphax iohannis Bertolani, Guidi & Rebecchi, 1996
- Bryodelphax kristenseni Lisi, Daza, Londoño & Quiroga, 2017
- Bryodelphax lijiangensis Yang, 2002
- Bryodelphax maculatus Gąsiorek, Stec, Morek, Marnissi & Michalczyk, 2017
- Bryodelphax mareki Kayastha, Roszkowska, Mioduchowska, Gawlak & Kaczmarek, 2021
- Bryodelphax mateusi (Fontoura, 1982)
- Bryodelphax meronensis Pilato, Lisi & Binda, 2010
- Bryodelphax nigripunctatus Degma, Gąsiorek, Vončina & Michalczyk, 2020
- Bryodelphax olszanowskii Kaczmarek, Parnikoza, Gawlak, Esefeld, Peter, Kozeretska & Roszkowska, 2018
- Bryodelphax ortholineatus (Bartoš, 1963)
- Bryodelphax parvulus Thulin, 1928
- Bryodelphax parvuspolaris Kaczmarek, Zawierucha, Smykla & Michalczyk, 2012
- Bryodelphax pucapetricolus DeMilio, Tumanov, Lawton, Kristensen & Hansen, 2022
- Bryodelphax sinensis (Pilato, 1974)
- Bryodelphax tatrensis (Węglarska, 1959)
- Bryodelphax wallacearthuri DeMilio, Tumanov, Lawton, Kristensen & Hansen, 2022
- Bryodelphax weglarskae (Pilato, 1972)
