= Hypechiniscus =

Scientific classification
- Kingdom: Animalia
- Phylum: Tardigrada
- Class: Heterotardigrada
- Order: Echiniscoidea
- Family: Echiniscidae
- Genus: Hypechiniscus; Thulin, 1928

Genus of tardigrades

Hypechiniscus is a genus of tardigrades in the family Echiniscidae. It was named and described by Gustav Thulin in 1928.

== Species ==
The genus includes the following species:

- Hypechiniscus cataractus Gąsiorek, Oczkowski, Bartels, Nelson, Kristensen & Michalczyk, 2021
- Hypechiniscus daedalus Gąsiorek, Oczkowski, Bartels, Nelson, Kristensen & Michalczyk, 2021
- Hypechiniscus exarmatus (Murray, 1907)
- Hypechiniscus fengi Sun & Li, 2013
- Hypechiniscus flavus Gąsiorek, Oczkowski, Bartels, Nelson, Kristensen & Michalczyk, 2021
- Hypechiniscus geminus Gąsiorek, Oczkowski, Bartels, Nelson, Kristensen & Michalczyk, 2021
- Hypechiniscus gladiator (Murray, 1905)
- Hypechiniscus papillifer Robotti, 1972
