= Mopsechiniscus =

Scientific classification
- Kingdom: Animalia
- Phylum: Tardigrada
- Class: Heterotardigrada
- Order: Echiniscoidea
- Family: Echiniscidae
- Genus: Mopsechiniscus; Du Bois-Reymond Marcus, 1944

Genus of tardigrades

Mopsechiniscus is a genus of terrestrial tardigrades in the family Echiniscidae. It was named and described by Eveline Du Bois-Reymond Marcus in 1944.

== Species ==
The genus includes the following species:

- Mopsechiniscus franciscae Guidetti, Rebecchi, Cesari & McInnes, 2014
- Mopsechiniscus frenoti Dastych, 1999
- Mopsechiniscus granulosus Mihelčič, 1967
- Mopsechiniscus imberbis (Richters, 1907)
- Mopsechiniscus schusteri Dastych, 1999
- Mopsechiniscus tasmanicus Dastych & Moscal, 1992
