= Bryochoerus intermedius =

Scientific classification
- Kingdom: Animalia
- Phylum: Tardigrada
- Class: Heterotardigrada
- Order: Echiniscoidea
- Family: Echiniscidae
- Genus: Bryochoerus
- Species: B. intermedius

Binomial name
- Bryochoerus intermedius (Murray), 1910

Synonyms
- Echiniscus intermedius Murray, 1910

Species of tardigrade

Bryochoerus intermedius is a species of tardigrade of the family Echiniscidae. It is one of two species of the genus Bryochoerus. The species was first described by James Murray in 1910 as Echiniscus intermedius.

== Subspecies ==
It has three subspecies:

- Bryochoerus intermedius intermedius (Murray, 1910)
- Bryochoerus intermedius hawaiicus (Thulin, 1928)
- Bryochoerus intermedius laevis (Marcus, 1936)
