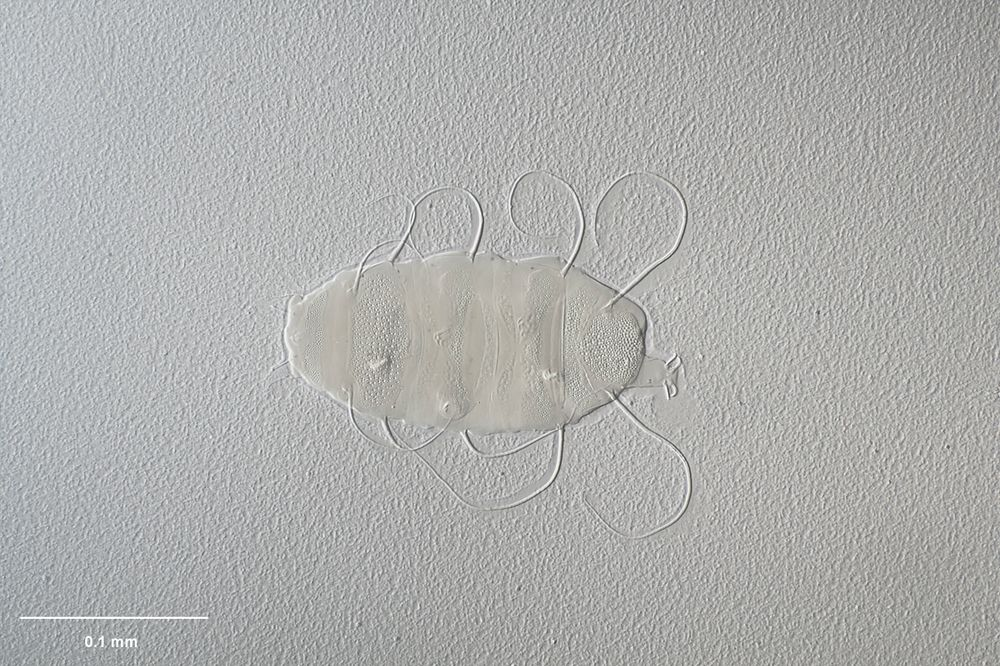
- Antechiniscus perplexus

Scientific classification
- Kingdom: Animalia
- Phylum: Tardigrada
- Class: Heterotardigrada
- Order: Echiniscoidea
- Family: Echiniscidae
- Genus: Antechiniscus; Kristensen, 1987

= Antechiniscus =

Genus of tardigrades

Antechiniscus is a genus of tardigrade in the family Echiniscidae. The genus was first described by Reinhardt Kristensen in 1987.

== Species ==
The genus includes six species:

- Antechiniscus conversus (Horning & Schuster, 1983)
- Antechiniscus jermani Rossi & Claps, 1989
- Antechiniscus lateromamillatus (Ramazzotti, 1964)
- Antechiniscus moscali Claxton, 2001
- Antechiniscus parvisentus (Horning & Schuster, 1983)
- Antechiniscus perplexus (Horning & Schuster, 1983)
