= Bryochoerus =

Scientific classification
- Domain: Eukaryota
- Kingdom: Animalia
- Phylum: Tardigrada
- Class: Heterotardigrada
- Order: Echiniscoidea
- Family: Echiniscidae
- Genus: Bryochoerus; Marcus, 1936

Genus of tardigrades

Bryochoerus is a genus of tardigrades in the family Echiniscidae.

== Species ==
This genus includes only two species:

- Bryochoerus intermedius (Murray, 1910)
- Bryochoerus liupanensis Xue, Li, Wang, Xian & Chen, 2017
