= Cornechiniscus =

Scientific classification
- Kingdom: Animalia
- Phylum: Tardigrada
- Class: Heterotardigrada
- Order: Echiniscoidea
- Family: Echiniscidae
- Genus: Cornechiniscus; Maucci & Ramazzotti, 1981.

Genus of tardigrades

Cornechiniscus is a genus of tardigrades in the family Echiniscidae. It was named and described by Walter Maucci and Giuseppe Ramazzotti in 1981.

== Species ==
The genus includes nine species:

- Cornechiniscus brachycornutus Maucci, 1987
- Cornechiniscus ceratophorus (Maucci, 1973)
- Cornechiniscus cornutus (Richters, 1907)
- Cornechiniscus holmeni (Petersen, 1951)
- Cornechiniscus lobatus (Ramazzotti, 1943)
- Cornechiniscus madagascariensis Maucci, 1993
- Cornechiniscus schrammi (Dastych, 1979)
- Cornechiniscus subcornutus Maucci & Ramazzotti, 1981
- Cornechiniscus tibetanus (Maucci, 1979)
