= Testechiniscus =

Scientific classification
- Kingdom: Animalia
- Phylum: Tardigrada
- Class: Heterotardigrada
- Order: Echiniscoidea
- Family: Echiniscidae
- Genus: Testechiniscus; Kristensen, 1987

Genus of tardigrades

Testechiniscus is a genus of tardigrades in the family Echiniscidae. The genus was named and described by Reinhardt Kristensen in 1987.

== Species ==
The genus includes four species:

- Testechiniscus laterculus (Schuster, Grigarick & Toftner, 1980)
- Testechiniscus macronyx (Richters, 1907)
- Testechiniscus meridionalis (Murray, 1906)
- Testechiniscus spitsbergensis (Scourfield, 1897)
