= Karl August Sigismund Schultze =

German anatomist (1795–1877)

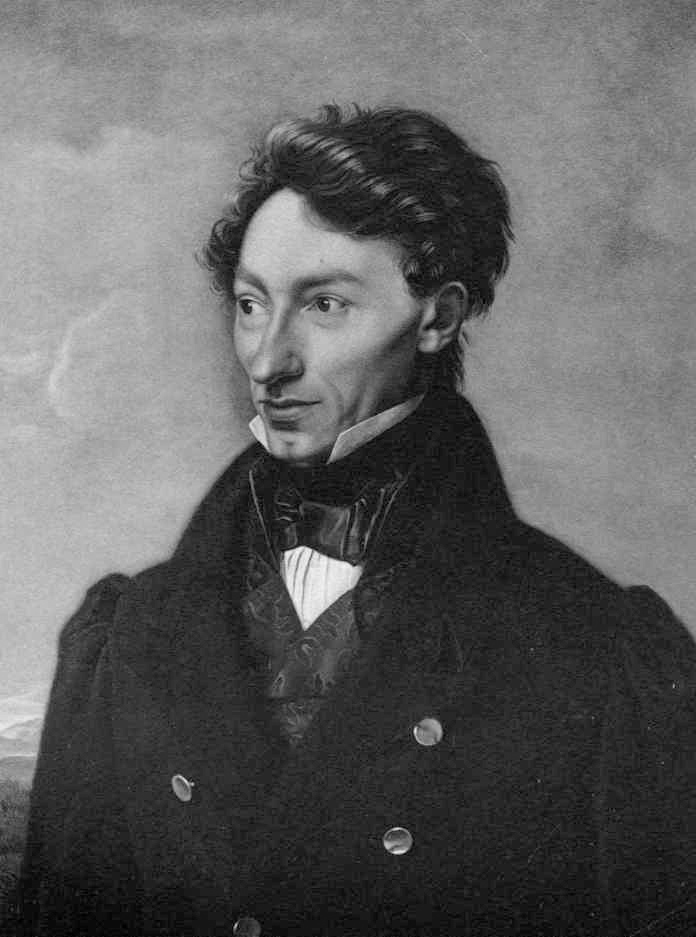
- Karl Schultze in 1837
- Born: 1 October 1795; Halle
- Died: 28 May 1877 (aged 81); Jena
- Occupation: Anatomist
- Known for: Anatomy building, University of Greifswald; First description of a tardigrade

Karl August Sigismund Schultze (1 October 1795 – 28 May 1877) was a German anatomist. He is known for the anatomy building at the University of Greifswald, which he had built, and for making the first formal description of a tardigrade.

== Biography ==
=== Early life and education ===
Karl Schultze was a son of the Halle city syndic Friedrich Schultze (1765–1806) and his wife Johanna Dorothea Apel (1765–1826). After his father's early death, August Hermann Niemeyer, chancellor of the University of Halle, became his guardian and enabled him to attend the Pädagogium Halle. He then studied from 1814 at the University of Halle and was a member of the Corps Teutonia (I) Halle and the Corps Guestphalia Halle. In 1817 he took part in the Wartburgfest. With a doctoral thesis under Johann Friedrich Meckel he was awarded a Dr. med. in Halle. His dissertation Nonnulla de primordiis systematis ossium et de evolutione spinae dorsi in animalibus was translated into French and English at Georges Cuvier's instigation. Schultze became Meckel's assistant and – in the same year – anatomy demonstrator (prosector). In 1821 he became director of the anatomical and physiological institutes of the Albert Ludwig University of Freiburg.

=== Institute for anatomy, Greifswald ===
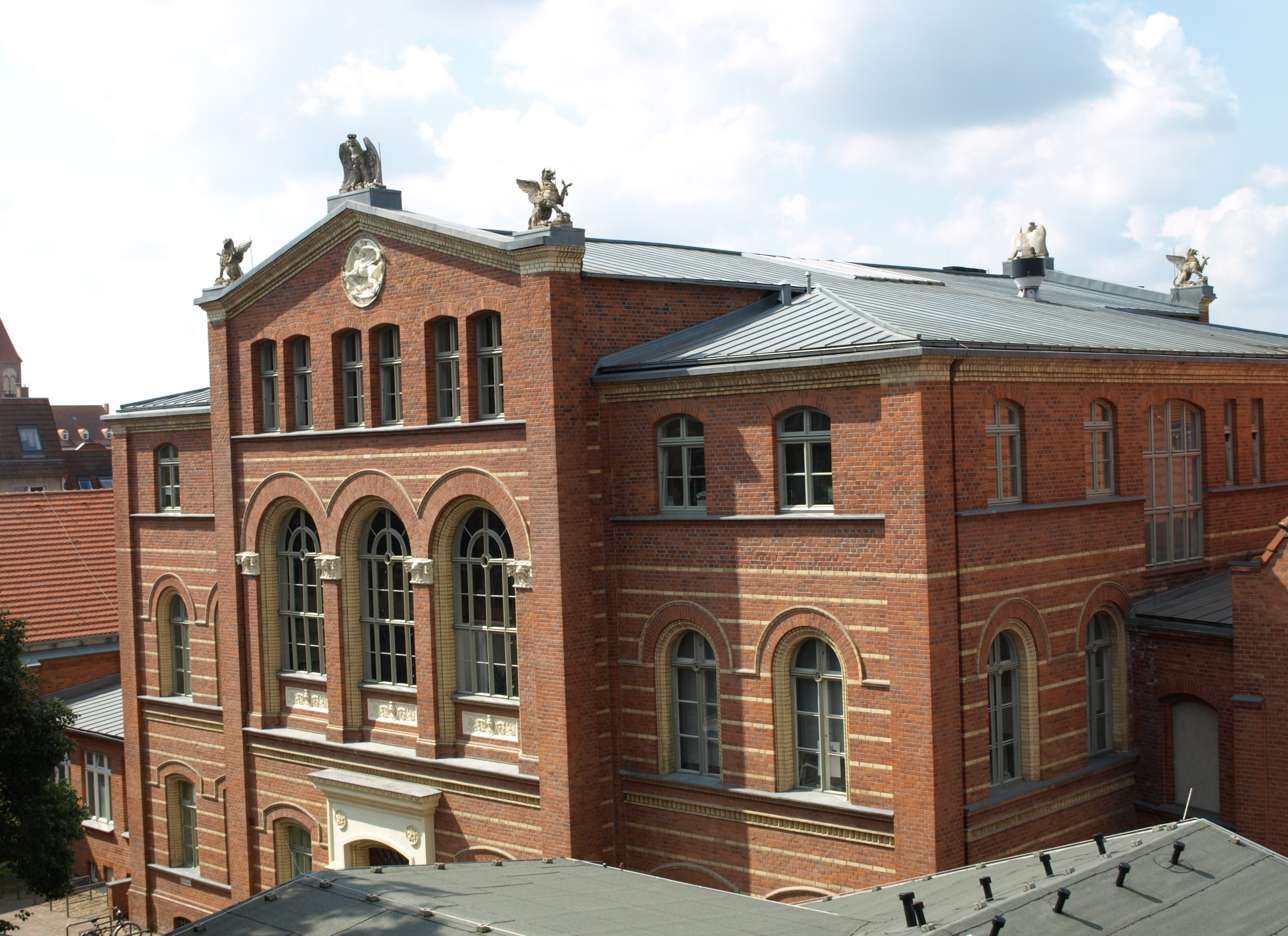
Greifswald Anatomy building

In 1831 Schultze moved to the Royal University of Greifswald. In 1855 he had his own institute for anatomy built on the site of the former Dominican monastery. The Greifswald anatomy building was long considered the best of its kind in Germany; it was restored in 1998.

In 1856 Schultze gave up his chair but remained a member of the teaching staff at the University of Greifswald. In 1869, after half a century as a university lecturer, he moved to live with his son Bernhard Sigmund Schultze in Jena.

=== Zoology ===
In 1834, Schulze gave the first formal description of any tardigrade, specifically Macrobiotus hufelandi, in a work subtitled "a new animal from the crustacean class, capable of reviving after prolonged asphyxia and dryness". In 1840 he named and described the genus Echiniscus.

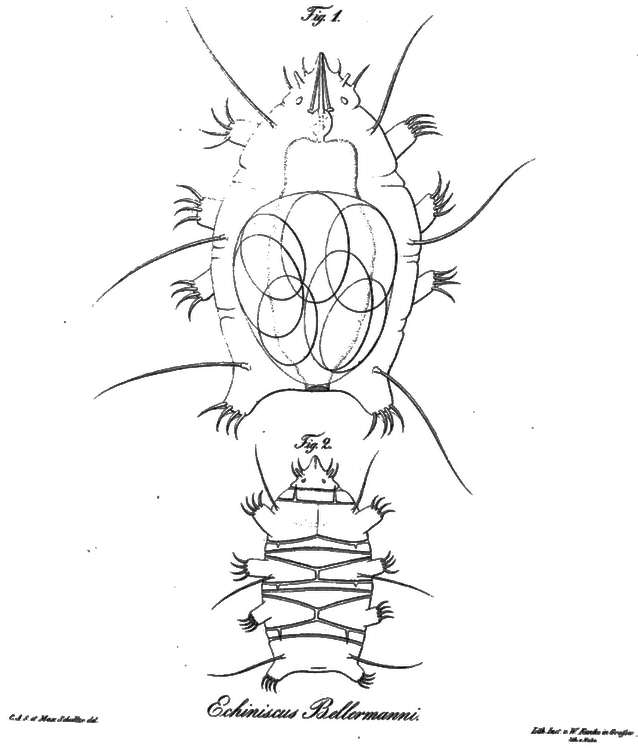
Echiniscus bellermanni by Schulze, 1840, dorsal and ventral views

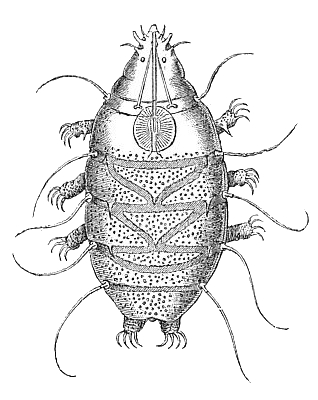
Echiniscus sp., by Schultze, 1861

== Honours and distinctions ==
From 1833, Schultze was a member of the German Academy of Natural Scientists Leopoldina. In 1862 he was awarded the title of Privy Medical Councillor, and in 1868 the Order of the Red Eagle, 3rd Class.

== Family ==
In 1822 he married Friederike Bellermann (1805–1885), daughter of the orientalist Johann Joachim Bellermann (1754–1842) and Dorothea Juliane Schorch (1769–1857). They had the following children:

- Max Schultze (1825–1874), Anatom und Zoologe, who married Christine Bellermann (1830–1865), daughter of Christian Friedrich Bellermann. After her death he married Sophie Sievers (1840–1911).
- August Sigismund Schultze (1833–1918), lawyer
- Bernhard Sigmund Schultze (1827–1919), gynaecologist

== Sources ==
- Lothar Kämpfe: Schultze, Karl (1795–1877). In: Dirk Alvermann, Nils Jörn (eds.): Biographisches Lexikon für Pommern. volume 2 (= Veröffentlichungen der Historischen Kommission für Pommern. Reihe V: Forschungen zur Pommerschen Geschichte. volume 48,2). Böhlau, Cologne etc 2015, ISBN 978-3-412-22541-4, pp. 251–256.
- Julius Pagel: Biographisches Lexikon hervorragender Ärzte des neunzehnten Jahrhunderts. Berlin, Vienna 1901, pp. 1549–1550 (Online).
