= Schultze's reagent =

Dense solution of zinc chloride and water

Schultze's reagent (also known as chlor-zinc-iodine solution) is a dense solution of zinc chloride and water in which iodine and potassium-iodide (IKI) is dissolved. It was first used by German microscopist and comparative anatomist Max Schultze and has a number of uses, notably to distinguish cellulosic from non-cellulosic structures in botanical microscopy. The formulation varies between authors, however, it generally consists of a 2:1 ratio of zinc chloride to water, with potassium iodide and elemental iodinepresent in concentrations of approximately 10–17.5% and 2–3.5%, respectively, relative to the total mass of the solution. The potassium iodide and iodine are in a 5:1 ratio in all variants.

Because Schultze's reagent is a high-molarity zinc chloride solution, it is a potential chemical hazard, being highly corrosive and a skin and membrane irritation hazard. In addition, elemental iodine is potentially toxic if ingested.

Schultze's reagent should be distinguished from a similarly-named solution, Schultze's macerating fluid, which is a solution of potassium chlorate and concentrated nitric acid, and is used in acid maceration of paleontological and palynological specimens.
