= Max Schultze =

German microscopic anatomist and phycologist (1825–1874)

Max Johann Sigismund Schultze
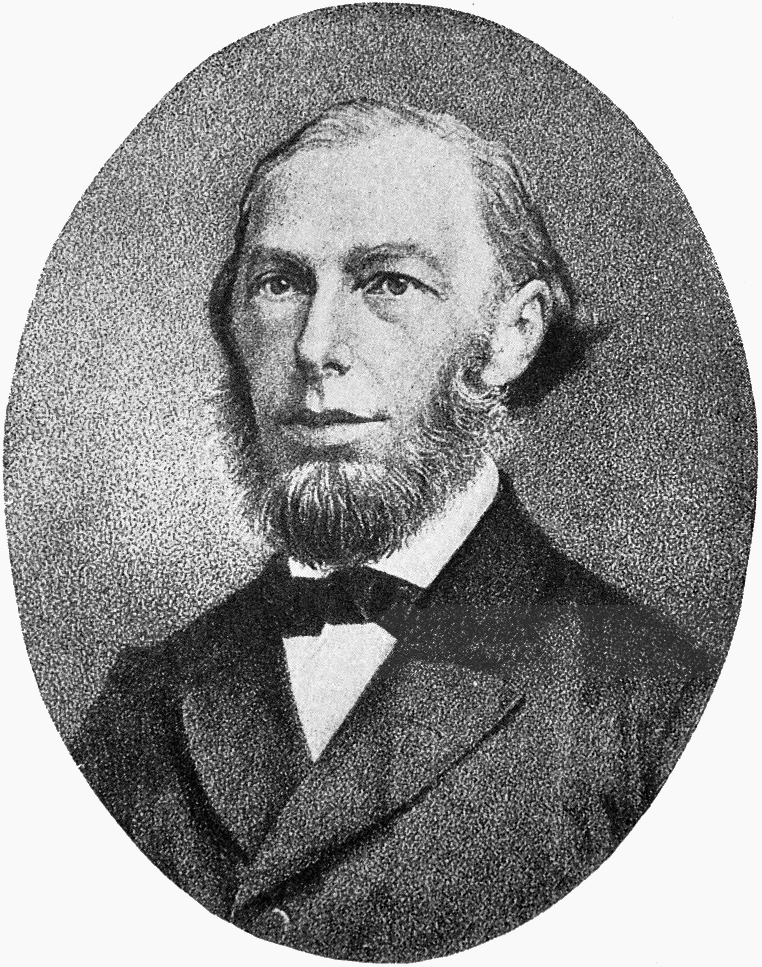
- Max Johann Sigismund Schultze c.1860
- Born: 25 March 1825; Freiburg, Germany
- Died: 16 January 1874 (aged 48); Bonn, Germany
- Education: Halle
- Known for: Discovery of Protoplasm Theory
- Scientific career
- Fields: anatomist

Max Johann Sigismund Schultze (25 March 1825 – 16 January 1874) was a German microscopic anatomist noted for his work on cell theory.

== Biography ==
Schultze was born in Freiburg im Breisgau (Baden), son of the anatomist Karl August Sigismund Schultze (1795–1877). He studied medicine at Greifswald and Berlin, and was appointed an associate professor of anatomy at the university of Halle in 1854. Five years later he became a full professor of anatomy and histology and director of the Anatomical Institute at the University of Bonn. He died in Bonn on 16 January 1874; his successor at the anatomical institute being Adolph von La Valette-St. George. He was the older brother of obstetrician Bernhard Sigmund Schultze (1827–1919).

He founded, in 1865, and edited the important "Archiv für mikroskopische Anatomie", to which he contributed many papers, and he advanced the subject generally, by refining on its technical methods. His works included:

- Beiträge zur Naturgeschichte der Turbellarien (1851).
- Uber den Organismus der Polythalamien (1854).
- Beiträge zur Kenntnis der Landplanarien (1857).
- Zur Kenntnis der elektrischen Organe der Fische (1858).
- Ein heizbarer Objecttisch und seine Verwendung bei Untersuchungen des Blutes, (In 1865 Schultze provided the first accurate description of the platelet).
- Zur Anatomie und Physiologie der Retina (1866).

His name is especially known for his work on cell theory. Uniting Félix Dujardin's conception of animal sarcode with Hugo von Mohl's of vegetable protoplasma, he pointed out their identity, and included them under the common name of protoplasm, defining the cell as a nucleated mass of protoplasm with or without a cell wall (Das Protoplasma der Rhizopoden und der Pflanzenzellen; ein Beiträg zur Theorie der Zelle, 1863).

Schultze studied medicine with the naturalist Fritz Müller, a German biologist and doctor who became a naturalized Brazilian. It was mainly because of his friendship and correspondence with Schultze that Müller to some extent was able to follow the debate in Europe about Darwin's theory of evolution. Schultze periodically sent him scientific literature, among which was Darwin's On the Origin of Species, and a small microscope manufactured in Berlin, by Friedrich Wilhelm Schiek (1857). Thanks to this microscope, Müller hypothesized from his own studies that "all higher Crustacea probably will be traceable to a Zoea ancestor". Based on these studies Müller also wrote his book Für Darwin, in defense of Darwin's theories, corroborating the theory of natural selection.

Swedish pathologist Axel Key studied under Schultze from 1860 to 1861 in Bonn.

== See also ==
- Schultze's reagent

== Sources ==
- "Schultze, Max Sigismund" . New International Encyclopedia. 1905.
