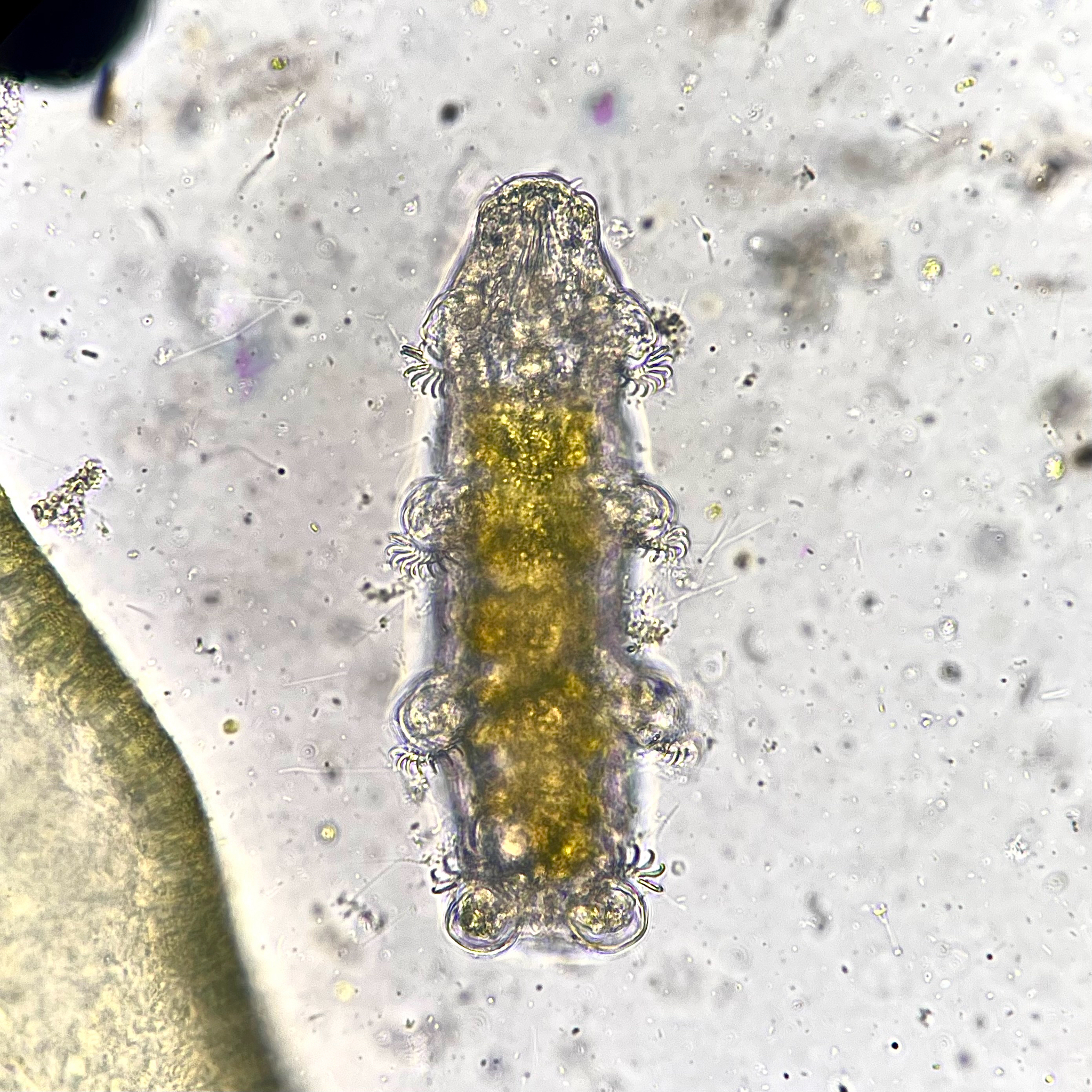

Scientific classification
- Kingdom: Animalia
- Phylum: Tardigrada
- Class: Heterotardigrada
- Order: Echiniscoidea
- Family: Echiniscoididae
- Subfamily: Echiniscoidinae
- Genus: Echiniscoides; Plate, 1888

Synonyms
- Echiniscoides Schultze, 1865

= Echiniscoides =

Genus of tardigrades

Echiniscoides is a genus of tardigrades in the family Echiniscoididae. It was named and described by Ludwig Hermann Plate in 1888.

== Species ==
The following species are recognised in the genus Echiniscoides:

- Echiniscoides andamanensis Chang & Rho, 1998
- Echiniscoides basalticus Gasiorek & Kristensen, 2022
- Echiniscoides bruni M.Gallo D'Addabbo, de Zio Grimaldi, Morone De Lucia & Troccoli, 1992
- Echiniscoides bufocephalus Gasiorek & Kristensen, 2022
- Echiniscoides costaricensis Bartels & Fontoura, 2021
- Echiniscoides galliensis Kristensen & Hallas, 1980
- Echiniscoides groenlandicus Kristensen & Hallas, 1980
- Echiniscoides hispaniensis Kristensen & Hallas, 1980
- Echiniscoides hoepneri Kristensen & Hallas, 1980
- Echiniscoides lichenophilus Gasiorek & Kristensen, 2022
- Echiniscoides mediterranicus Kristensen & Hallas, 1980
- Echiniscoides musa Gasiorek & Kristensen, 2022
- Echiniscoides polynesiensis Renaud-Mornant, 1976
- Echiniscoides porphyrae de Zio Grimaldi, M.Gallo D'Addabbo & Pietanza, 2000
- Echiniscoides ritavargasae Bartels, Fontoura, Mioduchowska & Kaczmarek, 2021
- Echiniscoides rugostellatus Perry, Rawson, Ameral & J.D.Miller, 2018
- Echiniscoides sigismundi (M.Schultze, 1865)
- Echiniscoides travei Bellido & Bertrand, 1981
- Echiniscoides trichosus Gasiorek & Kristensen, 2022
- Echiniscoides verrucariae de Zio Grimaldi, M.Gallo D'Addabbo & Pietanza, 2000
- Echiniscoides wyethi Perry & Miller, 2015
