= Bernhard Sigmund Schultze =

German obstetrician and gynecologist (1827–1919)

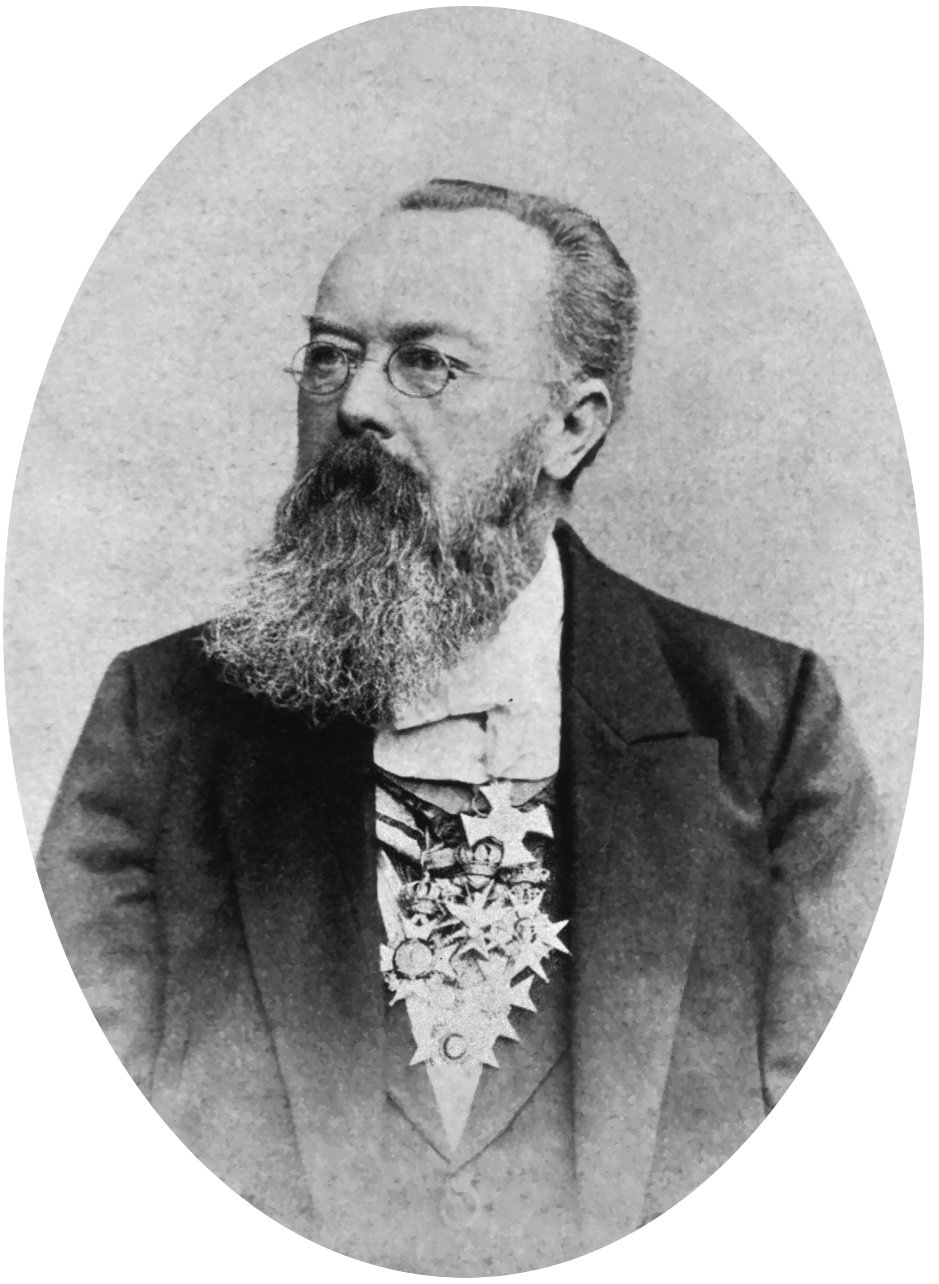
- Born: 29 December 1827
- Died: 17 April 1919 (aged 91)
- Education: University of Greifswald (doctorate)
- Occupations: Obstetrician, gynecologist
- Employer(s): University of Greifswald; University Women's Hospital, Berlin; University of Jena
- Children: Leonhard Schultze-Jena (son)
- Relatives: Max Schultze (brother)

Bernhard Sigmund Schultze; sometimes spelled Bernhard Sigismund Schultze (29 December 1827 in Freiburg im Breisgau – 17 April 1919) was a German obstetrician and gynecologist. He was a younger brother to anatomist Max Schultze (1825–1874) and son of Karl August Sigismund Schultze (1795–1877).

In 1851 he received his medical doctorate from the University of Greifswald, where in 1853 he became a lecturer on anatomy and physiology. During the following year, he became an assistant to Dietrich Wilhelm Heinrich Busch (1788–1858) at the University Women's Hospital in Berlin, and in 1858 relocated to the University of Jena as chair of the gynecological clinic. In 1864/65 he served as rector of the university.

== Family ==
- Leonhard Schultze-Jena (son), an explorer, zoologist, and anthropologist

== Medical eponyms ==
His name is associated with an obstetrical term known as "Schultze's method", which is a resuscitation technique used on an apparent stillborn child. Other eponyms associated with Schultze include:

- Schultze-Chvostek sign: A sign of tetany seen in hypocalcemia, commonly referred to as Chvostek's sign.
- Schultze's fold: A crescent-shaped amniotic fold.
- Schultze's placenta: A placenta expelled with the central portion in advance of the periphery.

== Selected writings ==
- Lehrbuch der Hebammenkunst (Textbook of midwifery), 1860.
- Das Nabelbläschen, ein constantes Gebilde in der Nachgeburt des ausgetragenen Kindes (The umbilical vesicle, a constant entity in the post-birth of the discharged child).
- Der Scheintod Neugeborner (The apparent death of the newborn), 1871.
- Ueber die Lageveränderungen der Gebärmutter (Overall situational changes in the uterus), 1873.
- Unser Hebammenwesen und das Kindbettfieber (Midwifery care and puerperal fever), 1884.
