= Adolph von La Valette-St. George =

German zoologist and anatomist (1831–1910)

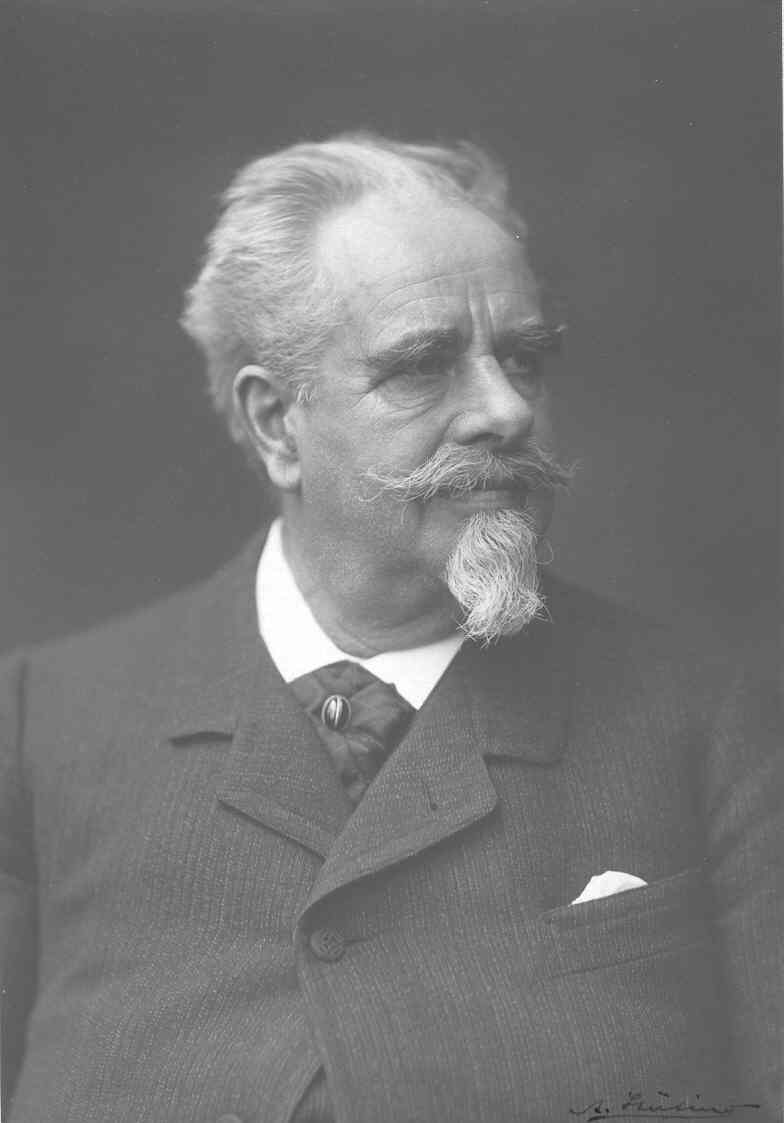
Adolph von La Valette-St. George

Adolph von La Valette-St. George (14 November 1831 in Schloss Auel – 29 November 1910 in Bonn) was a German zoologist and anatomist, known for his research in developmental biology.

He studied at the Friedrich Wilhelm University of Berlin, the Ludwig-Maximilians-Universität München, and the University of Würzburg, where he was a student of Albert von Kölliker. In 1855, he obtained his PhD with the thesis "Symbolae ad Trematodum evolutionis historiam", then in 1857 received his medical doctorate. In 1858, he qualified as a lecturer at the University of Bonn, where in 1862 he became an associate professor. In 1875, he was named a full professor and successor to Max Schultze as director of the anatomical institute at the University of Bonn.

He is credited with coining the terms spermatocyte (1876), spermatogonium (1876) and spermatid (1886). Some sources mention La Valette-St. George as the first to observe what would later be known as the Golgi apparatus (1865, 1867), a structure that he reportedly described in the sexual cells of snails.

== Published works ==
With Heinrich Wilhelm Gottfried von Waldeyer-Hartz (from 1874) and Oscar Hertwig (from 1889), he was co-editor of the journal "Archiv für mikroskopische Anatomie". The following are a list of some of his noted scientific works:

- Entwicklung der Trematoden, 1859 – Development of trematodes.
- Studien über die Entwicklung der Amphipoden, 1860 – Studies on the development of amphipods.
- Ueber die Entwicklung der Isopoden, 1864 – On the development of isopods.
- Ueber eine neue Art amöboider Zellen, 1865 – On a new kind of amoeboid cell.
- Ueber die Genese der Samenkörper, 1865 – On the genesis of spermatic bodies.
- Ueber den Keimfleck und die Deutung der Eitheile, 1866 – On the germinal spot and the construction of egg components.
- Entwicklung der Samenkörper beim Frosch, 1868 – Development of the spermatic bodies in frogs.
- Ueber einen neuen Fischbrutapparat, 1882 – On a new fish brooder.
- Zelltheilung und Samenbildung bei Forficula auricularia, 1887 – Cell division and spermatogenesis of Forficula auricularia.
- Ueber innere Zwitterbildung beim Flusskrebs, 1892 – On inner hermaphroditism in crayfish.
- Zwitterbildung beim kleinen Wassermolch, 1895 – Hermaphroditism in small newts.
- Zur Samen- und Eibildung beim Seidenspinner (Bombyx mori), 1897 – Sperm and egg formation in silkworms (Bombyx mori).
- Die Spermatogenese bei den Säugethieren und dem Menschen, 1898 – Spermatogenesis of quadrupeds and humans.
