= Carphania =

Scientific classification
- Kingdom: Animalia
- Phylum: Tardigrada
- Class: Heterotardigrada
- Order: Echiniscoidea
- Family: Carphaniidae; Binda & Kristensen, 1986
- Genus: Carphania; Binda, 1978
- Species: C. fluviatilis

Binomial name
- Carphania fluviatilis Binda, 1978

Species of tardigrade

Carphania fluviatilis is a species of tardigrade. It is the only known species within the genus Carphania, which is the only genus in the family Carphaniidae, which is part of the order Echiniscoidea. It was first described by Maria Grazia Binda in 1978. It is a freshwater species, endemic in Italy.
