= Oreella =

Scientific classification
- Domain: Eukaryota
- Kingdom: Animalia
- Phylum: Tardigrada
- Class: Heterotardigrada
- Order: Echiniscoidea
- Family: Oreellidae; Ramazzotti, 1962
- Genus: Oreella; Murray, 1910

Species
- See text

Genus of tardigrades

Oreella is a genus of tardigrades in the family Oreellidae. It is the only genus of that family. It was named and described by James Murray in 1920; the family Oreellidae was named and described by Giuseppe Ramazzotti in 1962. Ramazzotti gave the first modern description of the genus with his findings on O. minor, which was differentiated from another species by the name of O. mollis by its smaller size, spur presence on internal claws, and briefer stylets. Characteristics such as these can be considered as insufficient evidence of the delineation between species, however the differences in size of O. minor (≤170 μm) and O. mollis (≤251 μm), as well as the presence of the aforementioned claw spurs, would be considered notable features.

== Species ==
The genus Oreella contains the following species:

- Oreella chugachii Calloway, Miller, Johansson & Whiting, 2011
- Oreella mollis Murray, 1910
- Oreella vilucensis Rahm, 1931
