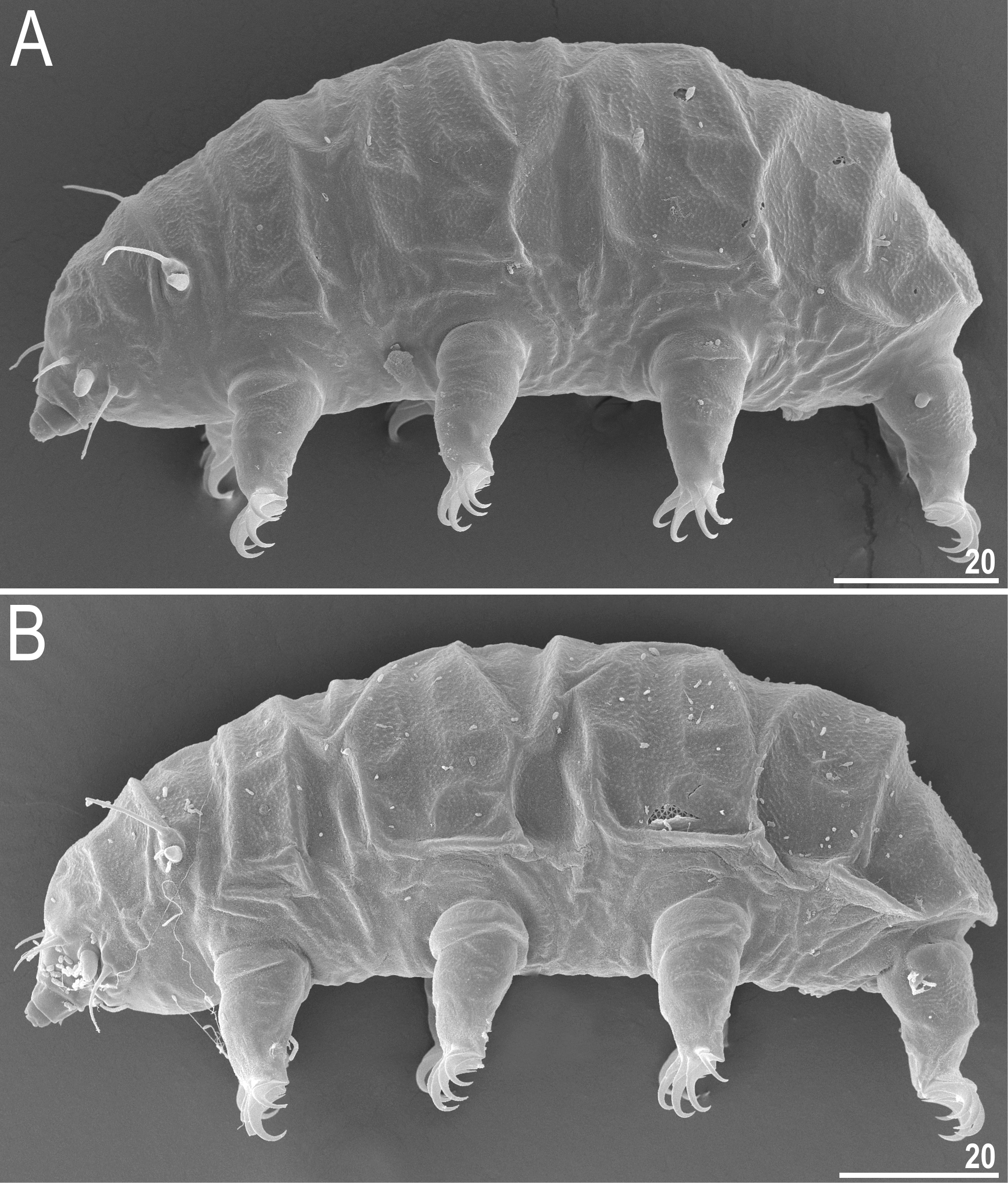
- Pseudechiniscus mascarenensis

Scientific classification
- Kingdom: Animalia
- Phylum: Tardigrada
- Class: Heterotardigrada
- Order: Echiniscoidea
- Family: Echiniscidae
- Genus: Pseudechiniscus; Thulin, 1911

= Pseudechiniscus =

Genus of tardigrades

Pseudechiniscus is a genus of tardigrades in the family Echiniscidae. The genus was named and described by Gustav Thulin in 1911.

== Species ==
The genus includes the following species:

- Pseudechiniscus alberti Dastych, 1987
- Pseudechiniscus asper Abe, Utsugi & Takeda, 1998
- Pseudechiniscus bartkei Węglarska, 1962
- Pseudechiniscus beasleyi Li, Wang & Yu, 2007
- Pseudechiniscus bidenticulatus Bartoš, 1963
- Pseudechiniscus bispinosus (Murray, 1907)
- Pseudechiniscus brevimontanus Kendall-Fite & Nelson, 1996
- Pseudechiniscus chengi Xue, Li, Wang, Xian & Chen, 2017
- Pseudechiniscus clavatus Mihelčič, 1955
- Pseudechiniscus conifer (Richters, 1904)
- Pseudechiniscus dicrani Mihelčič, 1938
- Pseudechiniscus facettalis Petersen, 1951
- Pseudechiniscus gullii Pilato & Lisi, 2006
- Pseudechiniscus insolitus Maucci, 1991
- Pseudechiniscus jiroveci Bartoš, 1963
- Pseudechiniscus juanitae de Barros, 1939
- Pseudechiniscus jubatus Biserov, 1990
- Pseudechiniscus megacephalus Mihelčič, 1951
- Pseudechiniscus nataliae Biserov & Maucci, 1986
- Pseudechiniscus novaezeelandiae (Richters, 1908)
- Pseudechiniscus occultus Dastych, 1980
- Pseudechiniscus papillosus Li, Wang, Liu & Su, 2005
- Pseudechiniscus pilatoi Li, 2007
- Pseudechiniscus pseudoconifer Ramazzotti, 1943
- Pseudechiniscus pulcher (Murray, 1910)
- Pseudechiniscus quadrilobatus Iharos, 1969
- Pseudechiniscus ramazzottii Maucci, 1952
- Pseudechiniscus santomensis Fontoura, Pilato & Lisi, 2010
- Pseudechiniscus scorteccii Franceschi, 1952
- Pseudechiniscus shilinensis Yang, 2002
- Pseudechiniscus spinerectus Pilato, Binda, Napolitano & Moncada, 2001
- Pseudechiniscus suillus (Ehrenberg, 1853)
- Pseudechiniscus titianae Vecchi, Cesari, Bertolani, Jönsson, Rebecchi & Guidetti, 2016
- Pseudechiniscus transsylvanicus Iharos, 1936
- Pseudechiniscus yunnanensis Wang, 2009
