= Echiniscoididae =

Scientific classification
- Kingdom: Animalia
- Phylum: Tardigrada
- Class: Heterotardigrada
- Order: Echiniscoidea
- Family: Echiniscoididae; Kristensen & Hallas, 1980

Subfamilies and genera
- Echiniscoidinae Kristensen & Hallas, 1980; Echiniscoides Plate, 1888; Neoechiniscoides Møbjerg, Jørgensen & Kristensen, 2019; Isocechiniscoidinae Møbjerg, Kristensen & Jørgensen, 2016; Isoechiniscoides Møbjerg, Kristensen & Jørgensen, 2016

Family of tardigrades

The Echiniscoididae are a family of tardigrades, water-dwelling, eight-legged, segmented micro-animals. It is one of the four families in the Echiniscoidea order.

The family of Echiniscoididae consists of the following subfamilies and genera:

- Echiniscoidinae Kristensen & Hallas, 1980
  - Echiniscoides Plate, 1888
  - Neoechiniscoides Møbjerg, Jørgensen & Kristensen, 2019
- Isoechiniscoidinae Møbjerg, Kristensen & Jørgensen, 2016
  - Isoechiniscoides Møbjerg, Kristensen & Jørgensen, 2016
