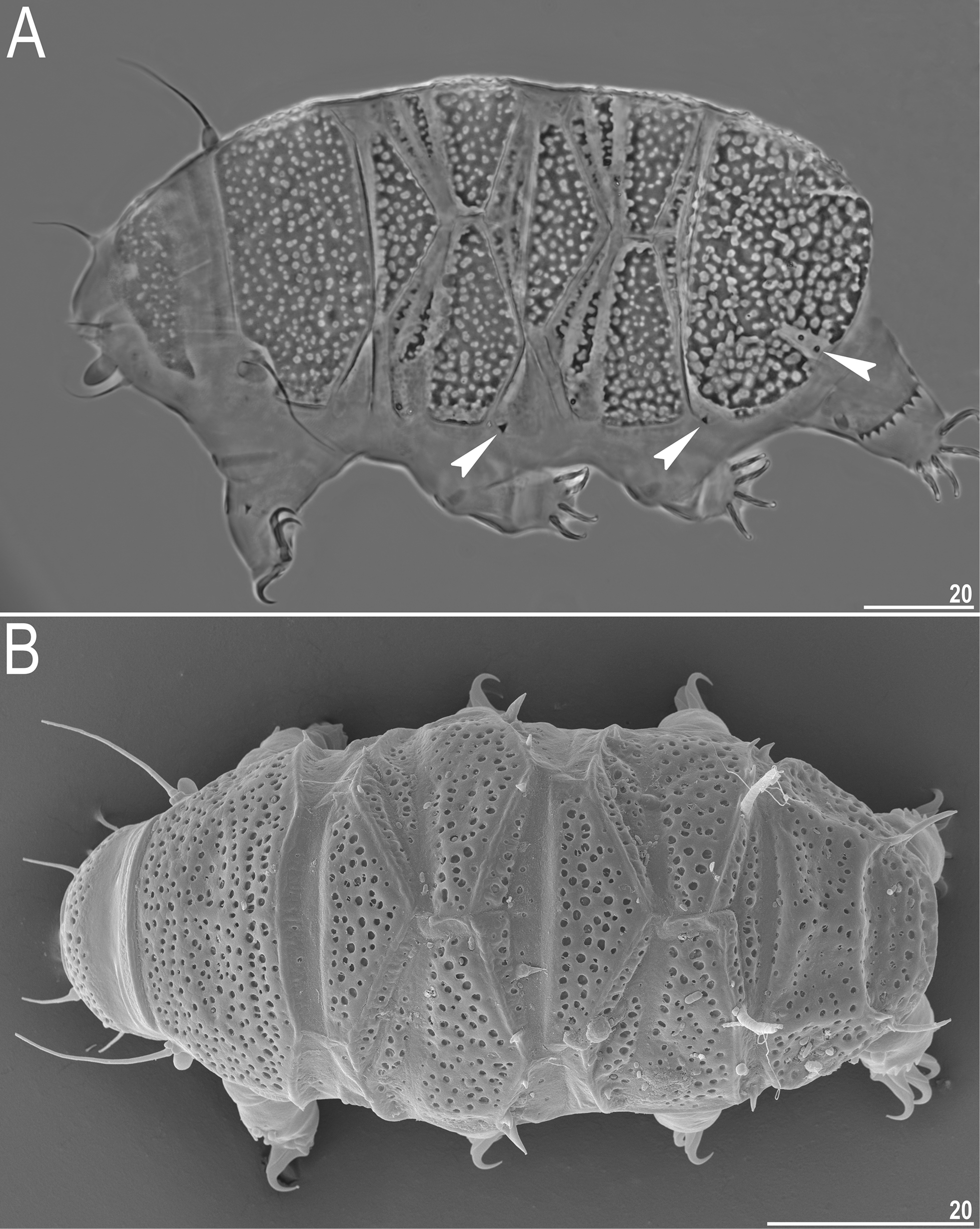
- Echiniscus insularis, as it appears under PCM (above) and SEM (below)

Scientific classification
- Kingdom: Animalia
- Phylum: Tardigrada
- Class: Heterotardigrada
- Order: Echiniscoidea
- Family: Echiniscidae; Thulin, 1928

Genera
- See text

= Echiniscidae =

Family of tardigrades

The Echiniscidae are a family of tardigrades, a phylum of water-dwelling, eight-legged, segmented micro-animals. It is one of the four families in the order Echiniscoidea. The family was named by Gustav Thulin in 1928.

== Genera ==
The family Echiniscidae consists of the following genera:

- Acanthechiniscus Vecchi, Cesari, Bertolani, Jönsson, Rebecchi & Guidetti, 2016
- Antechiniscus Kristensen, 1987
- Barbaria Michalczyk, Gąsiorek, Morek & Stec, 2019
- Bryochoerus Marcus, 1936
- Bryodelphax Thulin, 1928
- Claxtonia Gąsiorek & Michalczyk, 2019
- Cornechiniscus Maucci & Ramazzotti, 1981
- Diploechiniscus Vicente, Fontoura, Cesari, Rebecchi, Guidetti, Serrano & Bertolani, 2013
- Echiniscus Schultze, 1840
- Hypechiniscus Thulin, 1928
- Kristenseniscus Gąsiorek, Morek, Stec & Michalczyk, 2019
- Mopsechiniscus Du Bois-Reymond Marcus, 1944
- Multipseudechiniscus Schulte Miller, 2011
- Nebularmis Gąsiorek & Michalczyk, 2019
- Novechiniscus Kristensen, 1987
- Parechiniscus Cuénot, 1987
- Proechiniscus Kristensen, 1987
- Pseudechiniscus Thulin, 1911
- Testechiniscus Kristensen, 1987
- Viridiscus Gąsiorek & Michalczyk, 2019
- Zealandiscus Kaczmarek & Roszkowska, 2021
