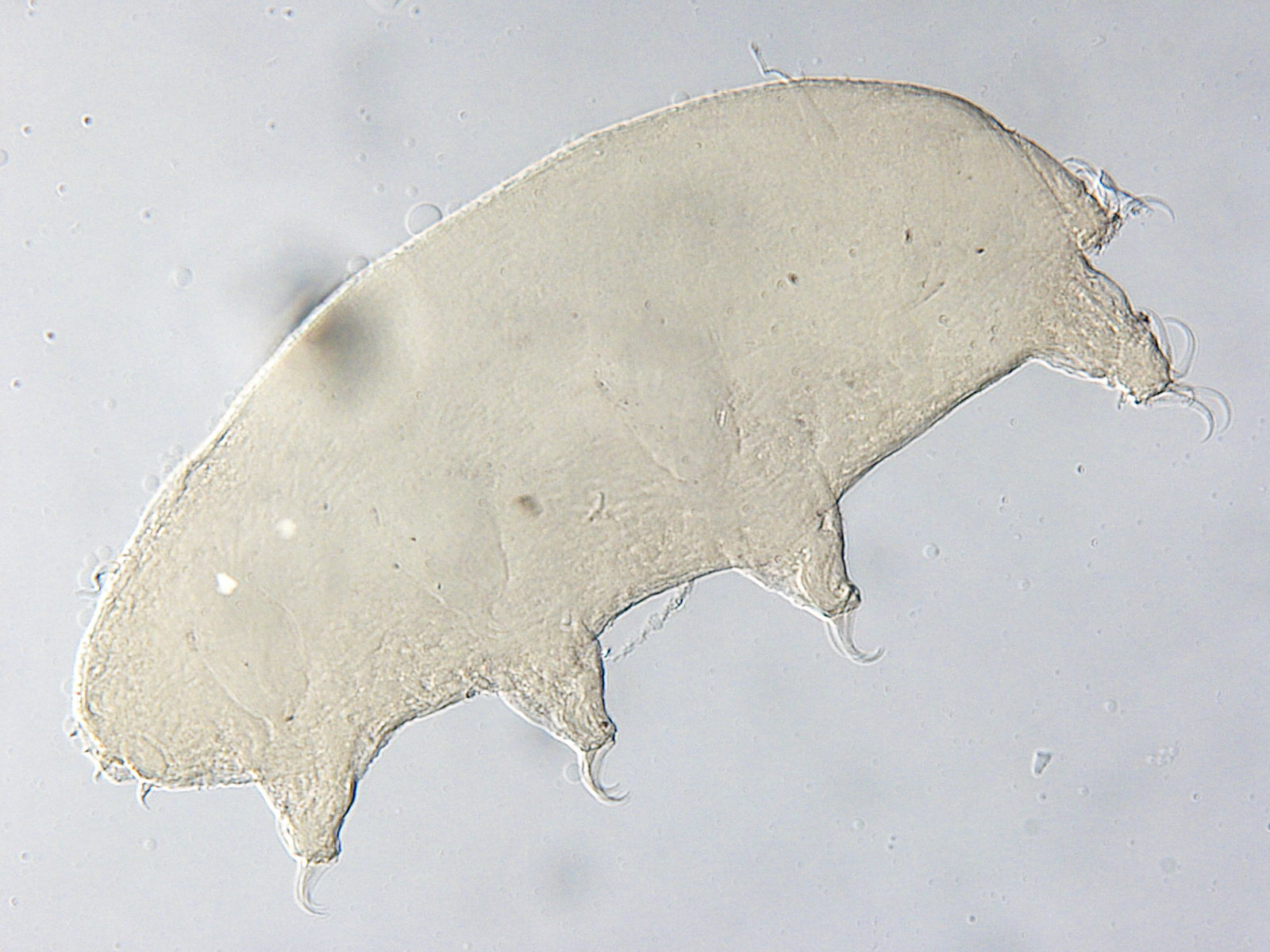
- Echiniscoides higginisi

Scientific classification
- Domain: Eukaryota
- Kingdom: Animalia
- Phylum: Tardigrada
- Class: Heterotardigrada
- Order: Echiniscoidea

Families
- See text

= Echiniscoidea =

Order of tardigrades

Echiniscoidea is an order of tardigrades, a phylum of water-dwelling, eight-legged, segmented micro-animals. It was first described by Richters in 1926.

== Families ==
The order Echiniscoidea consists of the following families:

- Carphaniidae Binda & Kristensen, 1986
- Echiniscidae Thulin, 1928
- Echiniscoididae Kristensen & Hallas, 1980
- Oreellidae Ramazzotti, 1962
