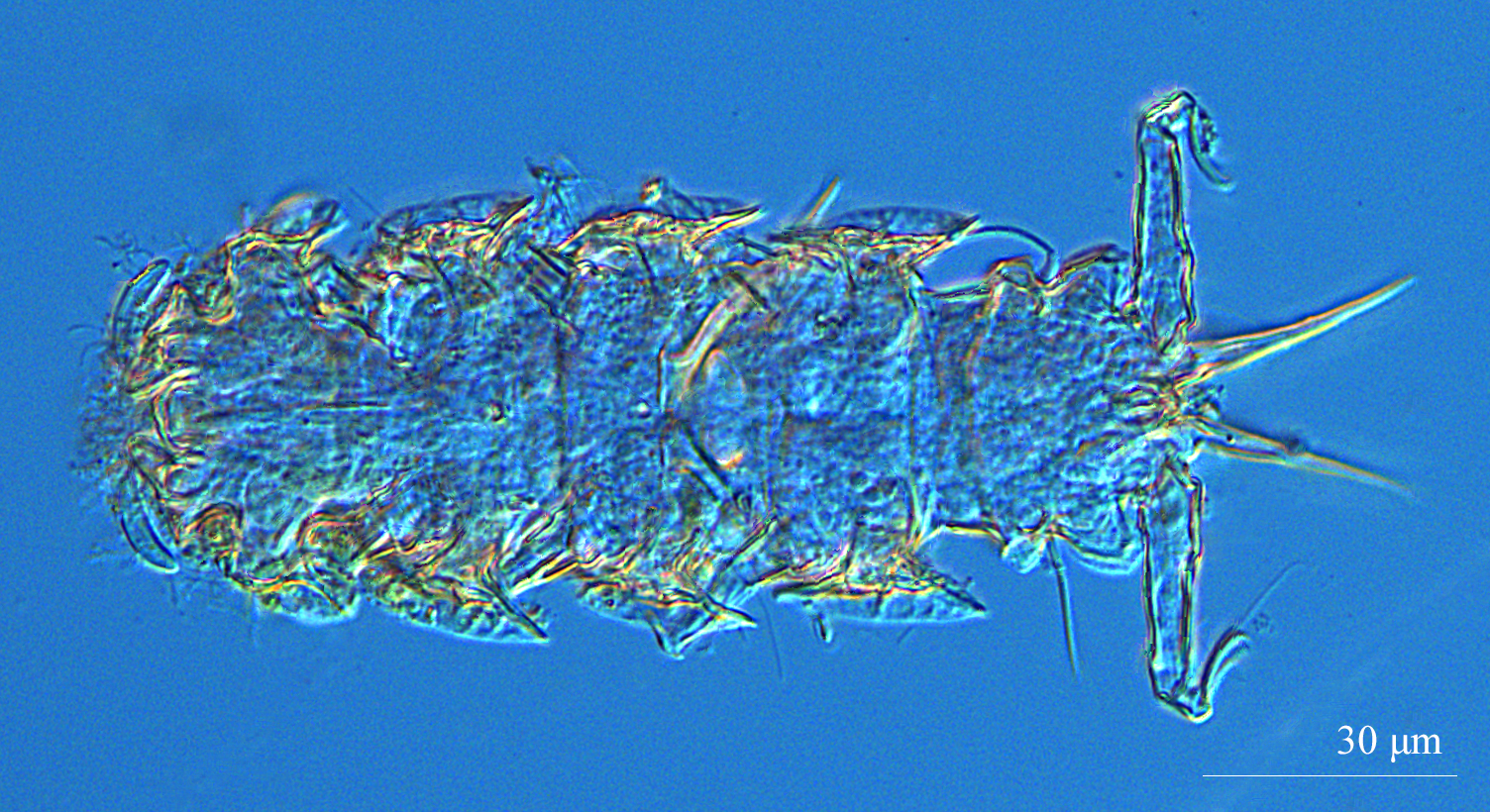

Scientific classification
- Kingdom: Animalia
- Phylum: Tardigrada
- Class: Heterotardigrada
- Order: Arthrotardigrada
- Family: Stygarctidae
- Genus: Stygarctus
- Species: S. keralensis

Binomial name
- Stygarctus keralensis Vishnudattan, Bijoy Nandan, Hansen & Jayachandran, 2021

= Stygarctus keralensis =

Genus of tardigrades

Stygarctus keralensis is a species of marine tardigrade. It is described from the intertidal area of Vadakara beach, Kerala it can be easily differentiated from closely related species S. gourbaultae. This species was described by groups of researchers namely N.K. Vishnudattan, S. Bijoy Nandan and P.R. Jayachandran of Cochin University of Science and Technology, Kerala, India and J.G. Hansen of University of Copenhagen, Denmark. This species has been named after "Kerala State" situated in the south west coast of India where this species live. The present discovery is an outcome of an ongoing Ministry of Earth Sciences-National Centre for Earth Science Studies study on the ecology and diversity of submarine groundwater habitats of Kerala led by Sivasankaran Bijoy Nandan.
