= Opydorscus =

Scientific classification
- Kingdom: Animalia
- Phylum: Tardigrada
- Class: Heterotardigrada
- Order: Arthrotardigrada
- Family: Halechiniscidae
- Genus: Opydorscus; Renaud-Mornant, 1989
- Species: O. fonsecae

Binomial name
- Opydorscus fonsecae Renaud-Mornant, 1989

Species of tardigrade

Opydorscus fonsecae is a species of tardigrades. It is the only species in the genus Opydorscus, part of the family Halechiniscidae and the subfamily Orzeliscinae. The species has been found on the Brazilian coast of the South Atlantic Ocean. The genus and the species were named by Jeanne Renaud-Mornant in 1983.
