= Rhomboarctus =

Scientific classification
- Kingdom: Animalia
- Phylum: Tardigrada
- Class: Heterotardigrada
- Order: Arthrotardigrada
- Family: Styraconyxidae
- Genus: Rhomboarctus; Renaud-Mornant, 1984

Genus of tardigrades

Rhomboarctus is a genus of tardigrades in the family Styraconyxidae. The genus was named and first described by Renaud-Mornant in 1984.

== Species ==
The genus includes three species:

- Rhomboarctus aslaki Hansen, Gallo D’Addabbo & de Zio Grimaldi, 2003
- Rhomboarctus duplicicaudatus Hansen, Gallo D’Addabbo & de Zio Grimaldi, 2003
- Rhomboarctus thomassini Renaud-Mornant, 1984
