= Coronarctus =

Scientific classification
- Kingdom: Animalia
- Phylum: Tardigrada
- Class: Heterotardigrada
- Order: Arthrotardigrada
- Family: Coronarctidae
- Genus: Coronarctus; Renaud-Mornant, 1974

Genus of tardigrades

Coronarctus is a genus of tardigrades in the family Coronarctidae. It was named and described by Renaud-Mornant in 1974.

== Species ==
The genus includes eleven species:

- Coronarctus disparilis Renaud-Mornant, 1987
- Coronarctus dissimilis Gomes-Júnior, E. Santos, da Rocha, P.J.P. Santos & Fontoura, 2020
- Coronarctus fastigatus Renaud-Mornant, 1987
- Coronarctus laubieri Renaud-Mornant, 1987
- Coronarctus mexicus Romano III, Gallo, D'Addabbo, Accogli, Baguley & Montagna, 2011 - Mexican crown bear
- Coronarctus neptunus Gomes-Júnior, E. Santos, da Rocha, P.J.P. Santos & Fontoura, 2020
- Coronarctus sonne Saulenko, Maiorova, Martínez Arbizu & Mordukhovich, 2022
- Coronarctus stylisetus Renaud-Mornant, 1987
- Coronarctus tenellus Renaud-Mornant, 1974
- Coronarctus verrucatus Hansen, 2007
- Coronarctus yurupari Gomes-Júnior, E. Santos, da Rocha, P.J.P. Santos & Fontoura, 2020
