= Parmursa =

Scientific classification
- Kingdom: Animalia
- Phylum: Tardigrada
- Class: Heterotardigrada
- Order: Arthrotardigrada
- Family: Halechiniscidae
- Genus: Parmursa; Renaud-Mornant, 1984

Genus of tardigrades

Parmursa is a genus of tardigrades, in the subfamily Euclavarctinae which is part of the family Halechiniscidae. The genus was named and described by Jeanne Renaud-Mornant in 1984.

== Species ==
The genus includes two species:

- Parmursa fimbriata Renaud-Mornant, 1984
- Parmursa torquata Hansen, 2007

== Publications ==
- Renaud-Mornant, 1984: Halechiniscidae (Heterotardigrada) de la campagne Benthedi, Canal du Mozambique. [Halechiniscidae (Heterotardigrada) from the Benthedi campaign, Mozambique Channel] Bulletin of the Muséum National d'Histoire Naturelle, Section A: Zoology, Biology and Animal Ecology, vol. 6, no 1, pp. 67–88.

Data related to Parmursa at Wikispecies
