= Raiarctus =

Scientific classification
- Domain: Eukaryota
- Kingdom: Animalia
- Phylum: Tardigrada
- Class: Heterotardigrada
- Order: Arthrotardigrada
- Family: Styraconyxidae
- Genus: Raiarctus; Renaud-Mornant, 1981

Genus of tardigrades

Raiarctus is a genus of tardigrades in the family Styraconyxidae. The genus was named and first described by Jeanne Renaud-Mornant in 1981.

== Species ==
The genus includes five species:

- Raiarctus aureolatus Renaud-Mornant, 1981
- Raiarctus colurus Renaud-Mornant, 1981 - type species
- Raiarctus jesperi Jørgensen, Boesgaard, Møbjerg & Kristensen, 2014
- Raiarctus katrinae Jørgensen, Boesgaard, Møbjerg & Kristensen, 2014
- Raiarctus variabilis D’Addabbo Gallo, Grimaldi de Zio & Morone De Lucia, 1986
