= Parastygarctus mediterranicus =

Scientific classification
- Kingdom: Animalia
- Phylum: Tardigrada
- Class: Heterotardigrada
- Order: Arthrotardigrada
- Family: Stygarctidae
- Genus: Parastygarctus
- Species: P. mediterranicus

Binomial name
- Parastygarctus mediterranicus Gallo D'Addabbo, Grimaldi de Zio & Sandulli, 2001

Species of tardigrade

Parastygarctus mediterranicus is a species of tardigrade, a member of the Stygarctidae. It is known from a few locations in the Adriatic Sea and the Tyrrhenian Sea, where it is found in coarse sand below tide level. Its rarity suggests it has specialist ecological requirements which are not well understood. The club shape of the clavae (sensory organs on the head), simple plate at the anal end of the body, and pointed projections on the sides of the body plates help distinguish it from other members of the genus.

== Anatomy and morphology ==
P. mediterranicus is typically 107 µm long.

The cephalic plate covering its head is 58 µm wide and 25 µm high. Like other members of Parastygarctus, the cephalic plate is divided into two lobes, and bears a full set of seven sensory cirri and two pairs of sensory organs known as clavae. The antero-ventral lobe bears a pair of internal cirri 13 µm long. The other sensory organs are on the dorsal lobe, which is further subdivided into a medio-lateral lobe and a lateral lobe on each side. The medio-lateral lobes bear external cirri 16 µm long adjacent to secondary clavae 7 µm long, while the lateral lobes bear lateral cirri and primary clavae of the same dimensions. A single medial cirrus is located on the midline of the dorsal lobe, close to the anterior edge. All seven cirri have a scapus (base), from which a short thin tube exends, bearing a flagellar portion at the apex. The clavae are club-shaped, which helps to distinguish it from other species in the genus.

There are three body plates of identical shape, with a small antero-ventral process and a large postero-dorsal process projecting on each side. Their pointed character is distinctive for the species. The body plates are 52 µm wide and 11–14 µm high. The antero-ventral process is 11 µm long, while the postero-dorsal process is 17 µm long. Oval plates are present between segments on the dorsal side.

The caudal plate is 33 µm wide and 22 µm in height. It is uncomplicated in form. On each side, a cirrophorus 4 µm long supports cirrus E, which has a 5-µm accordion-plated base and a 23-µm flagellar portion, as well as a 5-µm lateral projection shaped like a dome.

The four pairs of legs are attached to the body plates and the caudal plate. They are identical, each with four claws 7 µm long. The middle two claws bear long filaments. The bulbous P4 sensory organ on the fourth leg is present, but sensory organs are absent from the three legs attached to the body plates.

A gonopore (genital pore) occurs at the end of a 4-µm tube, located 7 µm from the anus. The gonopore is oval in the male and a rosette of six rays in the female, but the species is not otherwise sexually dimorphic.

== Ecology ==
The species was discovered by sampling the sediment (principally coarse sand) of two shallow subtidal marine caves. It also occurs in coarse sand at one locale off the coast of Sardinia. Its relatively rare occurrence in the Mediterranean suggests specialized habitat requirements.

== Reproduction ==
Development occurs through two larval stages. The first has two claws, and the anus and gonopore have not yet formed. The anus develops in the second larval stage, which resembles the adult except for the absence of the gonopore.

== Taxonomy ==
P. mediterranicus was scientifically described by Maria Gallo D'Addabo, Susanna De Zio Grimaldi, and Roberto Sandulli in 2001.

== Distribution ==
The species was originally described from two caves on San Domino, in the Tremiti Islands. It has also been found in the Gulf of Orosei, in Sardinia.
