= Mesostygarctus =

Scientific classification
- Kingdom: Animalia
- Phylum: Tardigrada
- Class: Heterotardigrada
- Order: Arthrotardigrada
- Family: Stygarctidae
- Genus: Mesostygarctus; Renaud-Mornant, 1979

Genus of tardigrades

Mesostygarctus is a genus of tardigrades, in the family Stygarctidae. It was first described and named by Jeanne Renaud-Mornant in 1979.

== Species ==
The genus includes two species:

- Mesostygarctus intermedius Renaud-Mornant, 1979
- Mesostygarctus spiralis Hansen, Kristensen & Jørgensen, 2012

== Publications ==
- Renaud-Mornant, 1979 : Tardigrades marins de Madagascar. 2. Stygarctidae et Oreellidae. 3. Considérations écologiques générales. [Underwater Tardigrades of Madagascar, 2. Stygarctidae and Oreellidae, 3. General Ecological Considerations] Bulletin du Muséum National d'Histoire Naturelle Section A Zoologie Biologie et Écologie Animales ser. 4, vol. 1, no. 2, pp. 339–351.

Data related to Mesostygarctus at Wikispecies
