= Parastygarctus =

Scientific classification
- Kingdom: Animalia
- Phylum: Tardigrada
- Class: Heterotardigrada
- Order: Arthrotardigrada
- Family: Stygarctidae
- Genus: Parastygarctus; Renaud-Debyser, 1965

Type species
- Parastygarctus higginsi Renaud-Debyser, 1965

Genus of tardigrades

Parastygarctus is a genus of tardigrades in the family Stygarctidae. It was first described and named by Jeanne Renaud-Debyser in 1965.

== Species ==
This genus includes seven species:

- Parastygarctus biungulatus Morone De Lucia, Grimaldi de Zio & D'Addabbo Gallo, 1984
- Parastygarctus higginsi Renaud-Debyser, 1965 - found in Madagascar
- Parastygarctus mediterranicus Gallo D’Addabbo, Grimaldi de Zio & Sandulli, 2001
- Parastygarctus renaudae Grimaldi de Zio, D’Addabbo Gallo, Morone De Lucia & Daddabbo, 1987
- Parastygarctus robustus Hansen, Kristensen & Jørgensen, 2012
- Parastygarctus sterreri Renaud-Mornant, 1970
- Parastygarctus svennevigi Hansen, Kristensen & Jørgensen, 2012

== Publications ==
- Renaud-Debyser, 1965 : Parastygarctus higginsi n. g., n. sp. Tardigrade marin interstitiel de Madagascar. [Parastygarctys higgins n. g. n. sp., Underwater Tardigrade from Madagascar] Report from the Academy of Sciences, Paris, vol. 260, pp. 955–957.

Data related to Parastygarctus at Wikispecies
