= Clavarctus falculus =

Scientific classification
- Kingdom: Animalia
- Phylum: Tardigrada
- Class: Heterotardigrada
- Order: Arthrotardigrada
- Family: Halechiniscidae
- Genus: Clavarctus; Renaud-Mornant, 1983
- Species: C. falculus

Binomial name
- Clavarctus falculus Renaud-Mornant, 1983

Species of tardigrade

Clavarctus falculus is a species of tardigrades. It is the only species in the genus Clavarctus, part of the family Halechiniscidae. The species has been found in deep sea in the Mozambique Channel.
