= Moebjergarctus manganis =

Scientific classification
- Kingdom: Animalia
- Phylum: Tardigrada
- Class: Heterotardigrada
- Order: Arthrotardigrada
- Family: Halechiniscidae
- Genus: Moebjergarctus
- Species: M. manganis

Binomial name
- Moebjergarctus manganis Bussau, 1992

Species of tardigrade

Moebjergarctus manganis is a species of tardigrades. It is in the genus Moebjergarctus, part of the family Halechiniscidae. The species has been found in the southeastern part of the Pacific Ocean. They were first named and described by Christian Bussau in 1992.
