= Euclavarctus =

Scientific classification
- Kingdom: Animalia
- Phylum: Tardigrada
- Class: Heterotardigrada
- Order: Arthrotardigrada
- Family: Halechiniscidae
- Genus: Euclavarctus; Renaud-Mornant, 1975

Genus of tardigrades

Euclavarctus is a genus of tardigrades, in the subfamily Euclavarctinae which is part of the family Halechiniscidae. The genus was named and described by Jeanne Renaud-Mornant in 1975.

== Species ==
The genus includes two species:

- Euclavarctus convergens Renaud-Mornant, 1983
- Euclavarctus thieli Renaud-Mornant, 1975

== Publications ==
- Renaud-Mornant (1975), Deep-sea Tardigrada from the Meteor Indian Ocean expedition. Meteor Forschungsergebnisse. Reihe D: Biologie, vol. 21, pp. 54–61.

Data related to Euclavarctus at Wikispecies
