= Proclavarctus fragilis =

Scientific classification
- Kingdom: Animalia
- Phylum: Tardigrada
- Class: Heterotardigrada
- Order: Arthrotardigrada
- Family: Halechiniscidae
- Genus: Proclavarctus; Renaud-Mornant, 1983
- Species: P. fragilis

Binomial name
- Proclavarctus fragilis Renaud-Mornant, 1983

Species of tardigrade

Proclavarctus fragilis is a species of tardigrades. It is the only species in the genus Proclavarctus, part of the family Halechiniscidae. The species has been found in deep sea in the Mozambique Channel and the Bay of Biscay.
