= Ligiarctus =

Scientific classification
- Kingdom: Animalia
- Phylum: Tardigrada
- Class: Heterotardigrada
- Order: Arthrotardigrada
- Family: Halechiniscidae
- Genus: Ligiarctus; Renaud-Mornant, 1982
- Species: L. eastwardi

Binomial name
- Ligiarctus eastwardi Renaud-Mornant, 1982

Genus of tardigrades

Ligiarctus is a monotypic genus of tardigrades, in the subfamily Florarctinae which is part of the family Halechiniscidae. The genus was named and described by Jeanne Renaud-Mornant in 1982. Its only species is Ligiarctus eastwardi.

== Publications ==
- Renaud-Mornant, 1982 : Sous-famille et genre nouveaux de tardigrades marins (Arth(r)otardigrada). [New Subfamily and Genre of Underwater Tardigrades (Arthrotardigrada)] Bulletin from Muséum National d'Histoire Naturelle Section A Zoologie Biologie et Écologie Animales, vol. 4, no 1/2, pp. 89–94.

Data related to Ligiarctus at Wikispecies
