= Chrysoarctus =

Scientific classification
- Kingdom: Animalia
- Phylum: Tardigrada
- Class: Heterotardigrada
- Order: Arthrotardigrada
- Family: Halechiniscidae
- Genus: Chrysoarctus; Renaud-Mornant, 1984

Genus of tardigrades

Chrysoarctus is a genus of tardigrades, in the subfamily Halechiniscinae which is part of the family Halechiniscidae. The genus was named and described by Jeanne Renaud-Mornant in 1984.

== Species ==
The genus includes two species:

- Chrysoarctus briandi Renaud-Mornant, 1984
- Chrysoarctus flabellatus (Grimaldi de Zio, D'Addabbo Gallo, Morone De Lucia, Vaccarella & Grimaldi, 1982)

== Publications ==
- Renaud-Mornant, 1984 : Halechiniscidae (Heterotardigrada) de la campagne Benthedi, Canal du Mozambique. Bulletin from the Muséum National d'Histoire Naturelle Section A: Zoology Biology and Ecological Animals, vol. 6, no 1, pp. 67–88.

Data related to Chrysoarctus at Wikispecies
