= Exoclavarctus =

Scientific classification
- Kingdom: Animalia
- Phylum: Tardigrada
- Class: Heterotardigrada
- Order: Arthrotardigrada
- Family: Halechiniscidae
- Genus: Exoclavarctus; Renaud-Mornant, 1983
- Species: E. dineti

Binomial name
- Exoclavarctus dineti Renaud-Mornant, 1983

Genus of tardigrades

Exoclavarctus is a genus of tardigrades in the family Halechiniscidae. Its only species is Exoclavarctus dineti. The species has been found in the deep sea in the Bay of Biscay.
