= Tanarctus =

Scientific classification
- Kingdom: Animalia
- Phylum: Tardigrada
- Class: Heterotardigrada
- Order: Arthrotardigrada
- Family: Tanarctidae
- Genus: Tanarctus; Renaud-Debyser, 1959

Genus of tardigrades

Tanarctus is a genus of tardigrades in the family Tanarctidae, named and described by Jeanne Renaud-Debyser in 1959.

== Species ==
The genus includes 13 species:

- Tanarctus arborspinosus Lindgren, 1971
- Tanarctus bubulubus Jørgensen & Kristensen, 2001
- Tanarctus dendriticus Renaud-Mornant, 1980
- Tanarctus diplocerus Fujimoto, Miyazaki & Suzuki, 2013
- Tanarctus gracilis Renaud-Mornant, 1980
- Tanarctus helleouetae Renaud-Mornant, 1984
- Tanarctus heterodactylus Renaud-Mornant, 1980
- Tanarctus hirsutospinosus Jørgensen, Boesgaard, Møbjerg & Kristensen, 2014
- Tanarctus longisetosus Grimaldi de Zio, D'Addabbo Gallo, Morone De Lucia, Vaccarella & Grimaldi, 1982
- Tanarctus minotauricus Renaud-Mornant, 1984
- Tanarctus ramazzottii Renaud-Mornant, 1975
- Tanarctus tauricus Renaud-Debyser, 1959 - type species
- Tanarctus velatus McKirdy, Schmidt & McGinty-Bayly, 1976
