= Tholoarctus =

Scientific classification
- Kingdom: Animalia
- Phylum: Tardigrada
- Class: Heterotardigrada
- Order: Arthrotardigrada
- Family: Styraconyxidae
- Genus: Tholoarctus; Kristensen & Renaud-Mornant, 1983

Genus of tardigrades

Tholoarctus is a genus of tardigrades in the family Styraconyxidae. The genus was named and first described by Kristensen and Renaud-Mornant in 1983.

== Species ==
The genus includes two species:

- Tholoarctus natans Kristensen & Renaud-Mornant, 1983
- Tholoarctus oleseni Jørgensen, Boesgaard, Møbjerg & Kristensen, 2014
