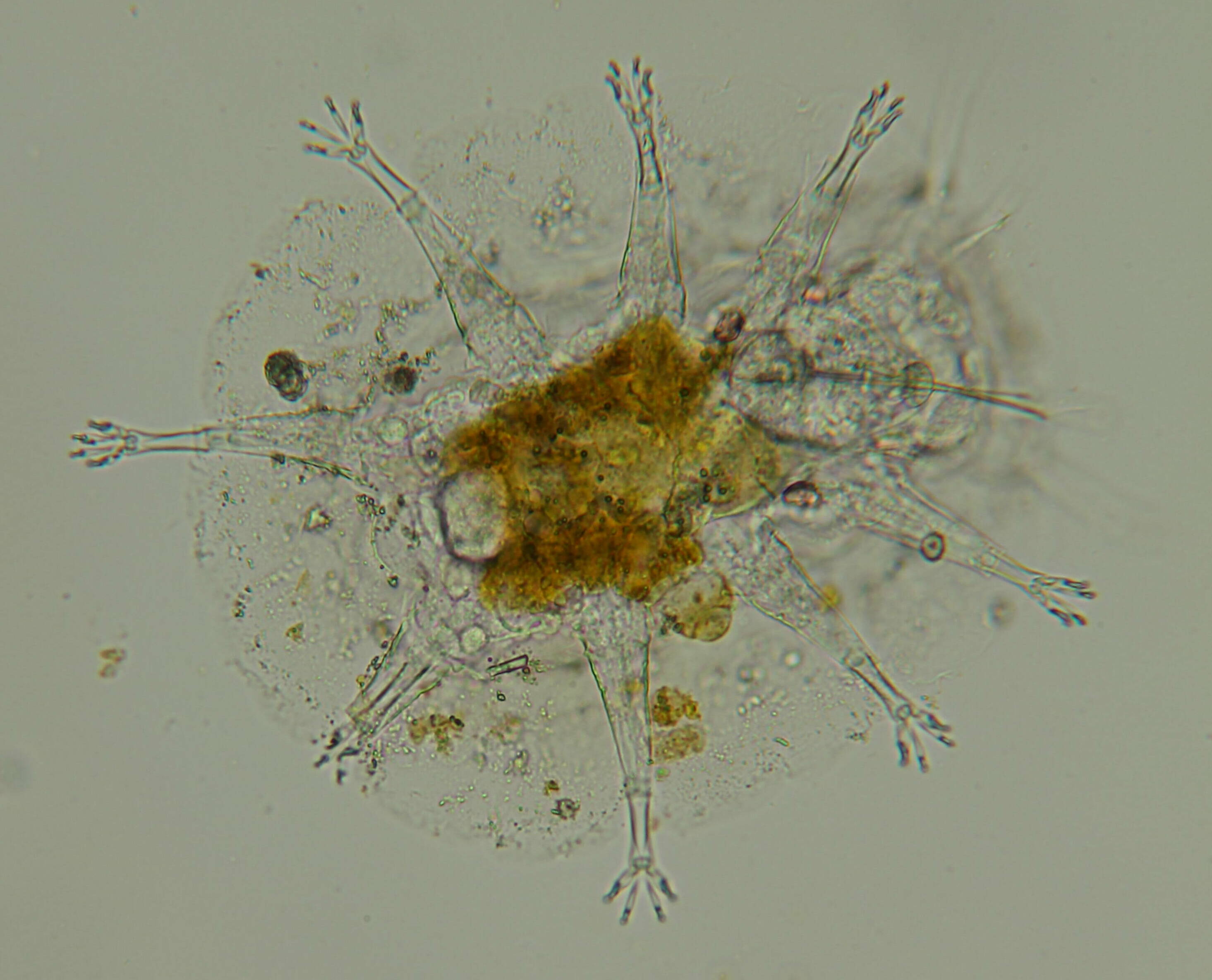
- Florarctus sp.

Scientific classification
- Kingdom: Animalia
- Phylum: Tardigrada
- Class: Heterotardigrada
- Order: Arthrotardigrada
- Family: Halechiniscidae
- Genus: Florarctus; Delamare Deboutteville & Renaud-Mornant, 1965

= Florarctus =

Genus of tardigrades

Florarctus is a genus of tardigrades, in the subfamily Florarctinae which is part of the family Halechiniscidae. The genus was named and described by Claude Delamare Deboutteville and Jeanne Renaud-Mornant in 1965.

== Species ==
The genus includes 14 species:

- Florarctus acer Renaud-Mornant, 1989
- Florarctus antillensis Van der Land, 1968
- Florarctus asper Renaud-Mornant, 1989
- Florarctus cervinus Renaud-Mornant, 1987
- Florarctus cinctus Renaud-Mornant, 1976
- Florarctus glareolus Noda, 1987
- Florarctus heimi Delamare Deboutteville & Renaud-Mornant, 1965
- Florarctus hulingsi Renaud-Mornant, 1976
- Florarctus kwoni Chang & Rho, 1997
- Florarctus pulcher Grimaldi de Zio, Lamarca, D'Addabbo Gallo & Pietanza, 1999
- Florarctus salvati Delamare Deboutteville & Renaud-Mornant, 1965
- Florarctus stellatus Renaud-Mornant, 1989
- Florarctus vulcanius Renaud-Mornant, 1987
- Florarctus wunai Fujimoto, 2015

== Publications ==
- Delamare Deboutteville & Renaud-Mornant (1965), Un remarquable genre de Tardigrades des sables coralliens de Nouvelle-Calédonie. [A remarkable genre of tardigrates from coral sands in New Caledonia] Comptes rendus hebdomadaires des séances de l'Académie des sciences, vol. 260, p. 2581-2583
- Data related to Florarctus at Wikispecies
