= Orzeliscus =

Scientific classification
- Domain: Eukaryota
- Kingdom: Animalia
- Phylum: Tardigrada
- Class: Heterotardigrada
- Order: Arthrotardigrada
- Family: Halechiniscidae
- Genus: Orzeliscus; Du Bois-Reymond Marcus, 1952

Genus of tardigrades

Orzeliscus is a genus of tardigrades in the family Halechiniscidae. The genus was named and described by Eveline Du Bois-Reymond Marcus in 1952.

== Species ==
The genus includes two species:

- Orzeliscus asiaticus Lee, Rho & Chang, 2017
- Orzeliscus belopus Du Bois-Reymond Marcus, 1952

== Publications ==
- Du Bois-Reymond Marcus, 1952 : On South American Malacopoda. Boletim da Faculdade de Filosofia, Ciências e Letras, Universidade de São Paulo, Zoology Series, vol. 17, p. 189-209.
- Data related to Orzeliscus at Wikispecies
