= Archechiniscus bahamensis =

Scientific classification
- Kingdom: Animalia
- Phylum: Tardigrada
- Class: Heterotardigrada
- Order: Arthrotardigrada
- Family: Archechiniscidae
- Genus: Archechiniscus
- Species: A. bahamensis

Binomial name
- Archechiniscus bahamensis Bartels, Fontoura & Nelson, 2018

Species of tardigrade

Archechiniscus bahamensis is a species of marine tardigrade in the family Archechiniscidae known from the Bahamas and Jamaica.

== Description ==
It has large, dark brown eyes and cuticular metameric folds which create clearly demarked cephalic and terminal segments. The cuticle is with fine punctation. The female body is 169 μm long and 69 μm wide. It has stubby, non-telescopic legs.

== Distribution and habitat ==
The species is known from shallow marine sediments of the Bahamas, where it inhabits interstitial spaces between sand grains and forms part of the meiofauna community. It lives in coastal marine environments of the western Atlantic, typical for species of Arthrotardigrada.
