= Trogloarctus trionyches =

Scientific classification
- Kingdom: Animalia
- Phylum: Tardigrada
- Class: Heterotardigrada
- Order: Arthrotardigrada
- Family: Coronarctidae
- Genus: Trogloarctus; Villora-Moreno, 1996
- Species: T. trionyches

Binomial name
- Trogloarctus trionyches Villora-Moreno, 1996

Species of tardigrade

Trogloarctus trionyches is a species of tardigrade in the family Coronarctidae. It is the only species in the genus Trogloarctus, which is part of the family Coronarctidae. This microscopic animal was discovered in a submarine cave called Trois Pepes near La Ciotat in southern France, representing the first member of the otherwise deep-sea family Coronarctidae found in a cave environment. The species name refers to its distinctive three-clawed feet, which differentiate it from other Coronarctidae genera that possess four claws. The discovery of Trogloarctus in a submarine cave with deep-sea-like conditions supports the hypothesis that marine caves may serve as ecological refuges for deep-sea organisms during periods of sea level regression.

== Description ==
Trogloarctus trionyches is a microscopic marine tardigrade measuring about 100–110 μm in length and 22–27 μm in width. It has an elongated, cylindrical, worm-like body with a smooth transparent cuticle featuring several folds between the legs, giving it a somewhat annulated (ringed) appearance.

Unlike other members of the family Coronarctidae, T. trionyches has only one pair of somatic cirri (sensory appendages), specifically cirrus E, which is positioned dorso-laterally and has a distinctive accordion-like base (scapus) and frayed tip. The head is slightly rounded and narrower than the body, with the mouth opening situated terminally.

The tardigrade has eleven cephalic sense organs, including small internal cirri inserted laterally near the mouth opening, a very small medial cirrus, ventrolateral external cirri, and flattened secondary clavae that are difficult to observe. Primary clavae are ovoid and inserted separately from cirrus A on a small cephalic lobe.

A distinctive feature of T. trionyches is the presence of only three claws on each leg (compared to four in other Coronarctidae). The claws are curved and medium-sized on the first three pairs of legs, while the fourth pair of legs bears longer claws. All legs have small spines on their medial portions.

Internally, the species has a spherical pharyngeal bulb containing three strong bar-shaped placoids, a feature considered plesiomorphic (ancestral) within the family. The buccal tube is highly refractive, possibly due to calcium carbonate incrustations. Female specimens display a six-platted rosette gonopore.

== Habitat and distribution ==
Trogloarctus trionyches was discovered in a unique submarine cave called "Trois Pepes" near La Ciotat (east of Marseille) in the French Mediterranean Sea. This 120-metre-long cave creates a deep-sea-like environment despite being accessible to scuba divers. The cave traps cold water (13–14.5 °C) that remains stable year-round, resembling the homothermy (stable temperature conditions) found in bathyo-abyssal Mediterranean waters. Complete darkness occurs beyond 50 metres from the entrance, and the cave floor is covered with muddy sediments.

Trogloarctus trionyches has only been found in the completely dark zones of the cave, primarily at the far end station (100 m from the entrance). The tardigrades were present only in the top layer of sediment (0–2 cm), where about 80% of the cave's meiofauna (microscopic sediment animals) is concentrated. The sediment at this location is primarily mud (80–90%) mixed with biodetritic material like sponge spicules, foraminiferan shells, and bryozoan skeletons. This discovery is significant as other members of the family Coronarctidae are typically found in deep-sea environments at depths exceeding 1600 metres. The cave's unique conditions create a bathyal-like habitat in relatively shallow water.

== Taxonomy ==
Trogloarctus trionyches was first described in 1996 by Santiago Villora-Moreno. The genus name combines the Greek words troglodytes (cave dweller) and arktos (bear), meaning "the bear living in the cave". The species name trionyches comes from the Greek words tria (three) and onyx (claw), referring to its three claws on each foot.

Trogloarctus belongs to the family Coronarctidae, which was previously only known from deep-sea environments. The discovery of this genus required an emendation of the family diagnosis to accommodate several distinctive features:

- The presence of only one pair of somatic cirri (cirrus E) rather than three (B, C, and E)
- Three claws on each foot instead of four
- Absence of large accessory spine on the fourth pair of legs
- Bar-shaped placoids in the pharyngeal bulb (considered a plesiomorphic character)

The discovery of T. trionyches in a submarine cave with deep-sea-like conditions supports the hypothesis that marine caves can serve as refuges for deep-sea fauna during sea level regressions, with subsequent dispersal facilitated by sea floor spreading.
