= Angursa =

Scientific classification
- Kingdom: Animalia
- Phylum: Tardigrada
- Class: Heterotardigrada
- Order: Arthrotardigrada
- Family: Styraconyxidae
- Genus: Angursa; Pollock, 1979

Genus of tardigrades

Angursa is a genus of tardigrades in the family Styraconyxidae. The genus was named and described by Leland W. Pollock in 1979.

== Species ==
The genus includes six species:

- Angursa antarctica Villora-Moreno, 1998
- Angursa bicuspis Pollock, 1979 - Western North Atlantic
- Angursa capsula Bussau, 1992
- Angursa clavifera Noda, 1985
- Angursa lanceolata Renaud-Mornant, 1981
- Angursa lingua Bussau, 1992
