= Bathyechiniscus tetronyx =

Scientific classification
- Kingdom: Animalia
- Phylum: Tardigrada
- Class: Heterotardigrada
- Order: Arthrotardigrada
- Family: Styraconyxidae
- Genus: Bathyechiniscus; Steiner, 1926
- Species: B. tetronyx

Binomial name
- Bathyechiniscus tetronyx Steiner, 1926

Species of tardigrade

Bathyechiniscus tetronyx is a species of tardigrades. It is the only species of the genus Bathyechiniscus, which belongs to the family Styraconyxidae. The species and genus were named by Gotthold Steiner in 1926, for the presence of four different exposed points or hooks on each claw. The species has been found in the Davis Sea, on the eastern coast of Antarctica.
