= Anisonychidae =

Scientific classification
- Domain: Eukaryota
- Kingdom: Animalia
- Phylum: Tardigrada
- Class: Heterotardigrada
- Order: Arthrotardigrada
- Family: Anisonychidae

Family of tardigrades

Anisonychidae is a family of tardigrades belonging to the order Arthrotardigrada.

Genera:

- Anisonyches Pollock, 1975
