= Stygarctus =

Scientific classification
- Kingdom: Animalia
- Phylum: Tardigrada
- Class: Heterotardigrada
- Order: Arthrotardigrada
- Family: Stygarctidae
- Genus: Stygarctus; Schulz, 1951

Genus of tardigrades

Stygarctus is a genus of tardigrades in the family Stygarctidae. It was named by Erich Schulz in 1951. The name is a combination of Greek Styx and arktos ("bear").

== Species ==
The genus includes the following species:

- Stygarctus abornatus McKirdy, Schmidt & McGinty-Bayly, 1976
- Stygarctus ayatori Fujimoto, 2014
- Stygarctus bradypus Schulz, 1951
- Stygarctus gourbaultae Renaud-Mornant, 1981
- Stygarctus granulatus Pollock, 1970
- Stygarctus lambertii Grimaldi de Zio, D’Addabbo Gallo, Morone De Lucia & Daddabbo, 1987
- Stygarctus spinifer Hiruta, 1985
- Stygarctus keralensis Vishnudattan, Bijoy Nandan, Hansen & Jayachandran, 2021
