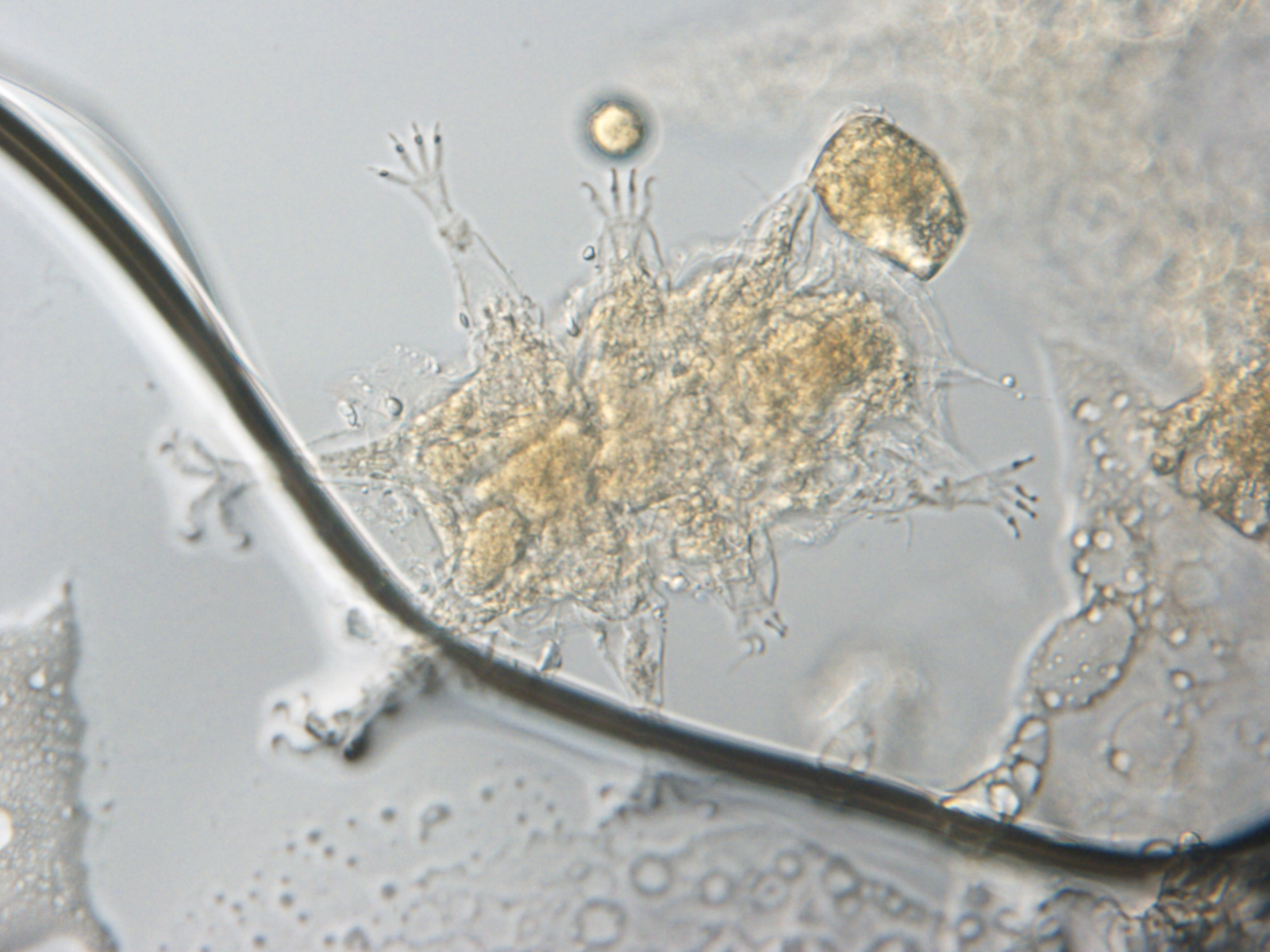
- Paratype specimen

Scientific classification
- Kingdom: Animalia
- Phylum: Tardigrada
- Class: Heterotardigrada
- Order: Arthrotardigrada
- Family: Halechiniscidae
- Genus: Paradoxipus; Kristensen & Higgins, 1989
- Species: P. orzeliscoides

Binomial name
- Paradoxipus orzeliscoides Kristensen & Higgins, 1989

= Paradoxipus =

Species of tardigrade

Paradoxipus orzeliscoides is a species of tardigrade. It is the only species in the genus Paradoxipus, part of the family Halechiniscidae and the subfamily Orzeliscinae. The species has been found in the coastal waters of the southeastern United States, in the western part of the Atlantic Ocean. The genus and the species were named and described by Reinhardt Kristensen and Robert P. Higgins in 1989.
