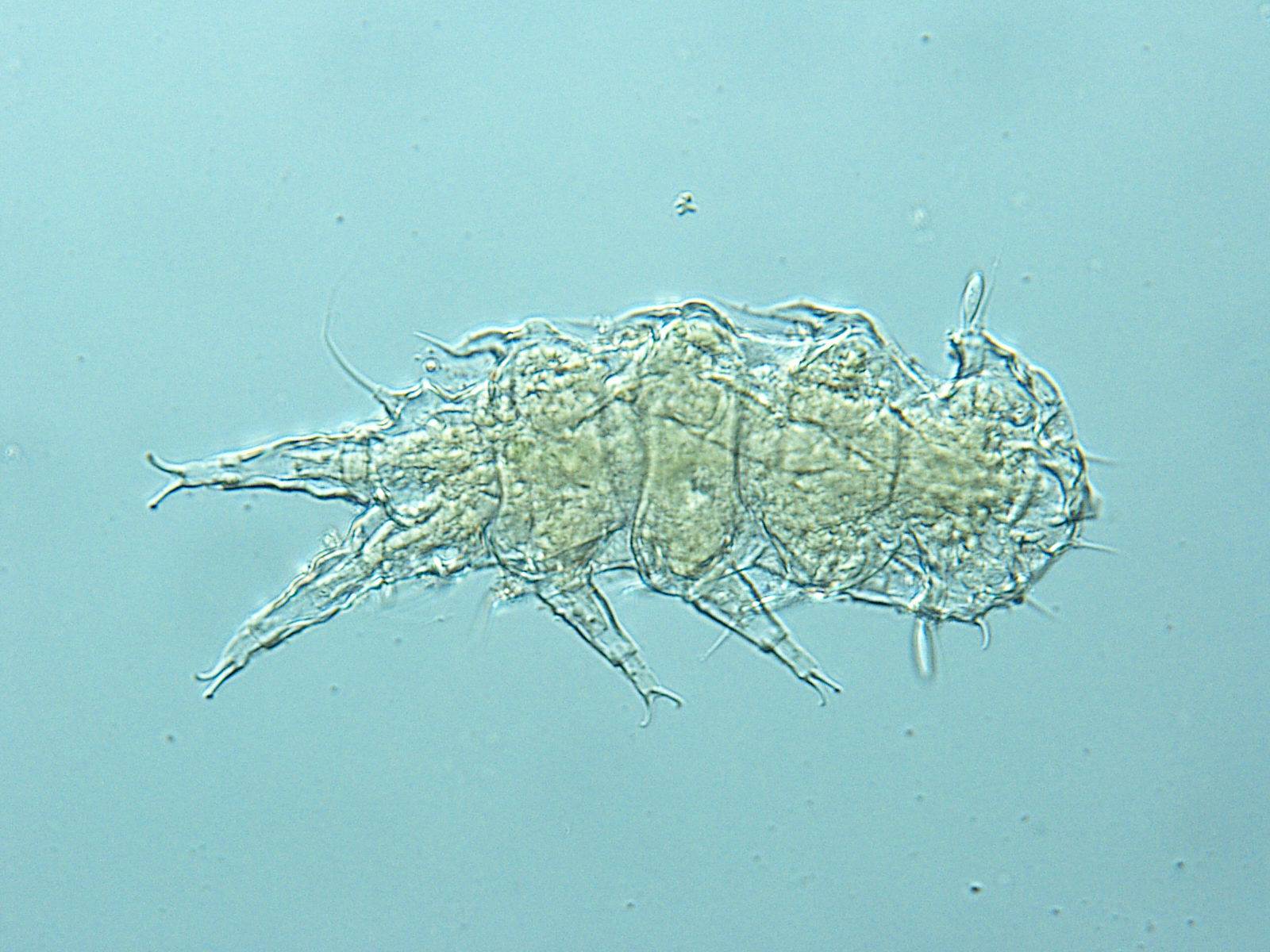
- Pseudostygarctus galloae

Scientific classification
- Domain: Eukaryota
- Kingdom: Animalia
- Phylum: Tardigrada
- Class: Heterotardigrada
- Order: Arthrotardigrada
- Family: Stygarctidae
- Genus: Pseudostygarctus; McKirdy, Schmidt & McGinty-Bayly, 1976

= Pseudostygarctus =

Genus of tardigrades

Pseudoastygarctus is a genus of tardigrades in the family Stygarctidae. The genus was first described and named by McKirdy, Schmidt & McGinty-Bayly in 1976.

== Species ==
The genus includes five species:

- Pseudostygarctus apuliae Gallo D’Addabbo, de Zio Grimaldi & D’Addabbo, 2000
- Pseudostygarctus galloae Hansen, Kristensen & Jørgensen, 2012
- Pseudostygarctus mirabilis de Zio Grimaldi, D’Addabbo Gallo & Morone De Lucia, 1998
- Pseudostygarctus rugosus Gallo D’Addabbo, de Zio Grimaldi & Sandulli, 2001
- Pseudostygarctus triungulatus McKirdy, Schmidt & McGinty-Bayly, 1976
