= Styraconyx =

Scientific classification
- Kingdom: Animalia
- Phylum: Tardigrada
- Class: Heterotardigrada
- Order: Arthrotardigrada
- Family: Styraconyxidae
- Genus: Styraconyx; Thulin, 1942

Genus of tardigrades

Styraconyx is a genus of tardigrades in the family Styraconyxidae. The genus was named and first described by Gustav Thulin in 1942.

== Species ==
The genus includes sixteen species:

- Styraconyx craticuliformis Chang & Rho, 1998
- Styraconyx craticulus (Pollock, 1983)
- Styraconyx hallasi Kristensen, 1977
- Styraconyx haploceros Thulin, 1942
- Styraconyx kristenseni Renaud-Mornant, 1981
- Styraconyx nanoqsunguak Kristensen & Higgins, 1984
- Styraconyx paulae Robotti, 1971
- Styraconyx qivitoq Kristensen & Higgins, 1984
- Styraconyx robertoi Pérez-Pech, de Jésus-Navarrate, DeMilio, Anguas-Escalante & Hansen, 2020
- Styraconyx sardiniae D'Addabbo Gallo, Morone de Lucia & Grimaldi de Zio, 1989
- Styraconyx sargassi Thulin, 1942
- Styraconyx takeshii Fujimoto, Suzuki, Ito, Tamura & Tsujimoto, 2020
- Styraconyx testudo D'Addabbo Gallo, Grimaldi de Zio & Morone de Lucia, 1984
- Styraconyx turbinarium Bartels, Fontoura & Nelson, 2015
- Styraconyx tyrrhenus D'Addabbo Gallo, Morone de Lucia & Grimaldi de Zio, 1989
- Styraconyx vargasi Bartels & Fontoura, 2021
