= Pleocola =

Scientific classification
- Kingdom: Animalia
- Phylum: Tardigrada
- Class: Heterotardigrada
- Order: Arthrotardigrada
- Family: Styraconyxidae
- Genus: Pleocola; Cantacuzène, 1951
- Species: P. limnoriae

Binomial name
- Pleocola limnoriae Cantacuzène, 1951

Genus of tardigrades

Pleocola is a monotypic genus of tardigrades. Its only species is Pleocola limnoriae, which belongs to the family Styraconyxidae. The species and genus were named by Alexandre Cantacuzène in 1951. It has been found in the North Atlantic Ocean, type locality Roscoff, Brittany, France. It was discovered living in commensalism on the isopod Limnoria lignorum.
