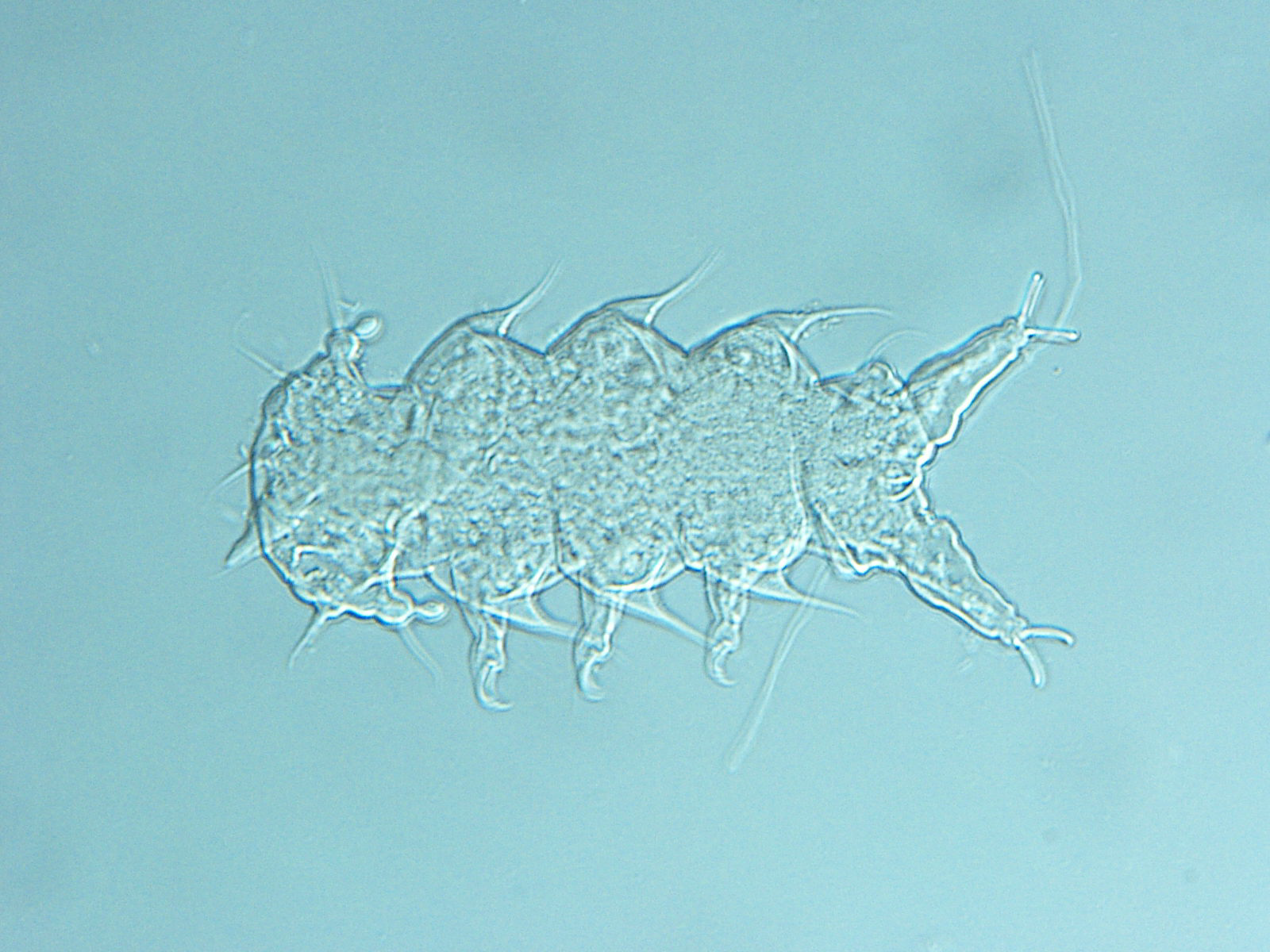
- 𝐹𝑎𝑟𝑜𝑒𝑔𝑎𝑟𝑐𝑡𝑢𝑠 𝑑𝑒𝑧𝑖𝑜𝑎𝑒

Scientific classification
- Kingdom: Animalia
- Phylum: Tardigrada
- Class: Heterotardigrada
- Order: Arthrotardigrada
- Family: Stygarctidae
- Genus: Faroestygarctus; Hansen, Kristensen & Jørgensen, 2012
- Species: F. dezioae

Binomial name
- Faroestygarctus dezioae Hansen, Kristensen & Jørgensen, 2012

= Faroestygarctus dezioae =

Species of tardigrade

Faroestygarctus dezioae is a species of armoured marine tardigrades. It is the only species of Faroestygarctus, a genus of the family Stygarctidae.

The genus name refers to the type locality: the Faroe Islands. It was described in 2012 by Jesper Guldberg Hansen, Reinhardt Kristensen and Aslak Jørgensen.
