= Tetrakentron synaptae =

Scientific classification
- Kingdom: Animalia
- Phylum: Tardigrada
- Class: Heterotardigrada
- Order: Arthrotardigrada
- Family: Styraconyxidae
- Genus: Tetrakentron; Cuénot, 1892
- Species: T. synaptae

Binomial name
- Tetrakentron synaptae Cuénot, 1892

Species of tardigrade

Tetrakentron is a monospecific genus of apparently parasitic tardigrade, within the family Styraconyxidae. The species and genus were named by Lucien Cuénot in 1892. The species has been found only near Roscoff, Brittany, France, in the Atlantic Ocean. It was discovered living on a sea cucumber species Leptosynapta inhaerens.
