= Batillipes lusitanus =

Scientific classification
- Domain: Eukaryota
- Kingdom: Animalia
- Phylum: Tardigrada
- Class: Heterotardigrada
- Order: Arthrotardigrada
- Family: Batillipedidae
- Genus: Batillipes
- Species: B. lusitanus

Binomial name
- Batillipes lusitanus Santos, Rubal, Veiga, da Rocha & Fontoura, 2018

Species of tardigrade

Batillipes lusitanus is a species of tardigrade in the genus Batillipes.

== Description ==
Batillipes lusitanus has middle toes on each four feet which are all equal in length. It exhibits a dorsal cuticular ornamentation which is constituted by large pillars, which makes the cuticle itself appear similar to that of B. adriaticus has.
