= Actinarctus =

Scientific classification
- Kingdom: Animalia
- Phylum: Tardigrada
- Class: Heterotardigrada
- Order: Arthrotardigrada
- Family: Tanarctidae
- Genus: Actinarctus; Schulz, 1935

Genus of tardigrades

Actinarctus is a genus of tardigrades in the family Tanarctidae. The genus was named and described by Erich Schulz in 1935.

== Species ==
The genus includes four species:

- Actinarctus doryphorus Schulz, 1935
- Actinarctus lyrophorus Renaud-Mornant, 1979
- Actinarctus neretinus Grimaldi de Zio, D'Addabbo Gallo, Morone De Lucia, Vaccarella & Grimaldi, 1982
- Actinarctus physophorus Grimaldi de Zio, D'Addabbo Gallo, Morone De Lucia, Vaccarella & Grimaldi, 1982
