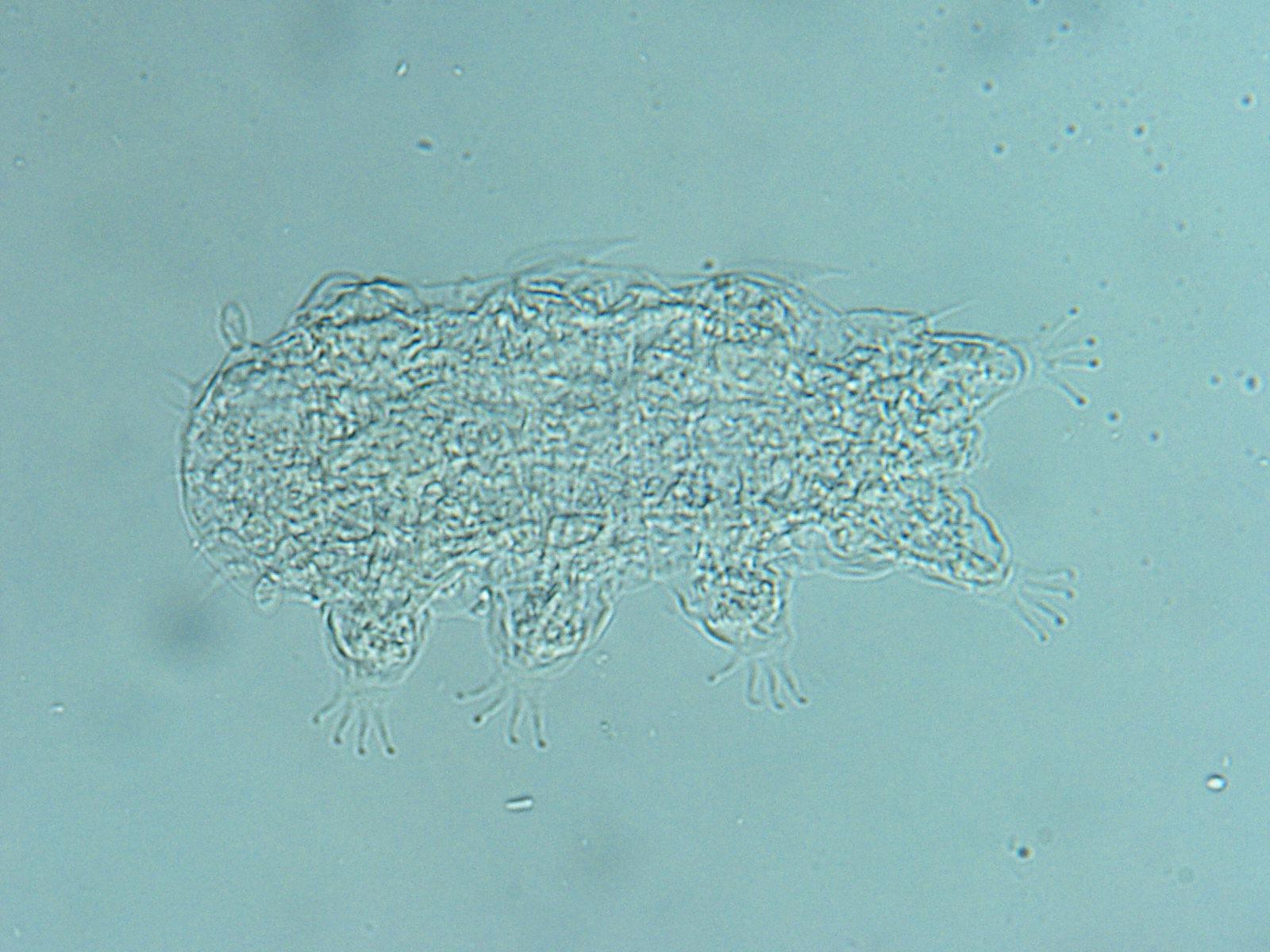
- Renaudarctus fossorius

Scientific classification
- Kingdom: Animalia
- Phylum: Tardigrada
- Class: Heterotardigrada
- Order: Arthrotardigrada
- Family: Renaudarctidae
- Genus: Renaudarctus; Kristensen & Higgins, 1984

= Renaudarctus =

Genus of tardigrades

Renaudarctus is a genus of tardigrades in the family Renaudarctidae. The genus was first described by Reinhardt Kristensen and Robert P. Higgins in 1984, and named after biologist Jeanne Renaud-Mornant.

== Species ==
The genus includes two species:

- Renaudarctus fossorius Hansen, Kristensen & Jørgensen, 2012
- Renaudarctus psammocryptus Kristensen & Higgins, 1984 - type species
