= Megastygarctides =

Scientific classification
- Domain: Eukaryota
- Kingdom: Animalia
- Phylum: Tardigrada
- Class: Heterotardigrada
- Order: Arthrotardigrada
- Family: Stygarctidae
- Genus: Megastygarctides; McKirdy, Schmidt & McGinty-Bayly, 1976

Genus of tardigrades

Megastygarctides is a genus of tardigrades, the only one in the subfamily Megastygarctidinae in the family Stygarctidae. The genus was first described and named by McKirdy, Schmidt & McGinty-Bayly in 1976. It was placed in the new subfamily Megastygarctidinae in 1998 by Bello and de Zio Grimaldi.

== Species ==
The genus includes the following species:

- Megastygarctides christinae Hansen & Kristensen, 2006
- Megastygarctides gerdae Hansen & Kristensen, 2006
- Megastygarctides isounguis Renaud-Mornant, 1981
- Megastygarctides orbiculatus McKirdy, Schmidt & McGinty-Bayly, 1976
- Megastygarctides setoloso Morgan & O'Reilly, 1989
- Megastygarctides sezginii Ürkmez, Ostrowska, Roszkowska, Gawlak, Zawierucha, Kristensen & Kaczmarek, 2017
