= Halechiniscus =

Scientific classification
- Kingdom: Animalia
- Phylum: Tardigrada
- Class: Heterotardigrada
- Order: Arthrotardigrada
- Family: Halechiniscidae
- Genus: Halechiniscus; Richters, 1908

Genus of waterbears

Halechiniscus is a genus of tardigrades in the family Halechiniscidae. It was named and described by Ferdinand Richters in 1908.

== Species ==
The genus includes 11 species:

- Halechiniscus chafarinensis Grimaldi de Zio & Villora Moreno, 1995
- Halechiniscus churakaagii Fujimoto, 2015
- Halechiniscus greveni Renaud-Mornant & Deroux, 1976
- Halechiniscus guiteli Richters, 1908
- Halechiniscus jejuensis Chang & Rho, 2002
- Halechiniscus macrocephalus Grimaldi de Zio, D’Addabbo Gallo & Morone De Lucia, 1988
- Halechiniscus paratuleari Grimaldi de Zio, D’Addabbo Gallo & Morone De Lucia, 1988
- Halechiniscus perfectus Schulz, 1955
- Halechiniscus remanei Schulz, 1955
- Halechiniscus tuleari Renaud-Mornant, 1979
- Halechiniscus yanakaagii Fujimoto, 2015

== Publications ==
- Richters (1908) Marine Tardigraden. [Marine Tardigrades] Zoologischer Anzeiger, vol. 33, pp. 77–85 (integral text, archive).

Data related to Halechiniscus at Wikispecies
