= Batillipes mirus =

Scientific classification
- Domain: Eukaryota
- Kingdom: Animalia
- Phylum: Tardigrada
- Class: Heterotardigrada
- Order: Arthrotardigrada
- Family: Batillipedidae
- Genus: Batillipes
- Species: B. mirus

Binomial name
- Batillipes mirus Richters, 1909

Species of tardigrade

Batillipes mirus is a species of marine tardigrade that lives on sandy surfaces, including near beaches. It has cosmopolitan distribution. The species is known from both marine and brackish waters.
