= Moebjergarctus =

Scientific classification
- Kingdom: Animalia
- Phylum: Tardigrada
- Class: Heterotardigrada
- Order: Arthrotardigrada
- Family: Halechiniscidae
- Genus: Moebjergarctus; Bussau, 1992

Species
- Moebjergarctus clarionclippertonensis Bai, Wang, Zhou, Lin, Meng, Fontoura, 2020; Moebjergarctus manganis Bussau, 1992

Genus of tardigrades

Moebjergarctus is a genus of tardigrades in the family Halechiniscidae.
