= Wingstrandarctus =

Scientific classification
- Domain: Eukaryota
- Kingdom: Animalia
- Phylum: Tardigrada
- Class: Heterotardigrada
- Order: Arthrotardigrada
- Family: Halechiniscidae
- Genus: Wingstrandarctus; Kristensen, 1984

Genus of tardigrades

Wingstrandarctus is a genus of tardigrades, in the subfamily Florarctinae which is part of the family Halechiniscidae. The genus was named and described by Kristensen in 1984.

== Species ==
The genus includes five species:

- Wingstrandarctus corallinus Kristensen, 1984
- Wingstrandarctus crypticus Renaud-Mornant, 1989
- Wingstrandarctus intermedius (Renaud-Mornant, 1967)
- Wingstrandarctus stinae Jørgensen, Boesgaard, Møbjerg & Kristensen, 2014
- Wingstrandarctus unsculptus Jørgensen, Boesgaard, Møbjerg & Kristensen, 2014

== Publications ==
- Kristensen, 1984 : On the biology of Wingstrandarctus corallinus nov. gen. et spec., with notes on the symbiotic bacteria in the subfamily Florarctinae (Arthrotardigrada). Videnskabelige Meddelelser fra Dansk Naturhistorisk Forening, vol. 145, p. 201-218.
- Data related to Wingstrandarctus at Wikispecies
