= Styraconyxidae =

Scientific classification
- Domain: Eukaryota
- Kingdom: Animalia
- Phylum: Tardigrada
- Class: Heterotardigrada
- Order: Arthrotardigrada
- Family: Styraconyxidae; Kristensen & Renaud-Mornant, 1983

Family of tardigrades

The Styraconyxidae are a family of tardigrades. The family was first described by Reinhardt Møbjerg Kristensen and Jeanne Renaud-Mornant in 1983.

== Genera ==
The family includes the following genera:

- Angursa Pollock, 1979
- Bathyechiniscus Steiner, 1926
- Lepoarctus Kristensen & Renaud-Mornant, 1983
- Paratanarctus D'Addabbo Gallo, Grimaldi de Zio, Morone De Lucia & Troccoli, 1992
- Pleocola Cantacuzène, 1951
- Raiarctus Renaud-Mornant, 1981
- Rhomboarctus Renaud-Mornant, 1984
- Styraconyx Thulin, 1942
- Tetrakentron Cuénot, 1892
- Tholoarctus Kristensen & Renaud-Mornant, 1983
