= Tanarctidae =

Scientific classification
- Domain: Eukaryota
- Kingdom: Animalia
- Phylum: Tardigrada
- Class: Heterotardigrada
- Order: Arthrotardigrada
- Family: Tanarctidae; Renaud-Mornant, 1980

Family of tardigrades

The Tanarctidae are a family of tardigrades. The family was named and described by Reinhardt Møbjerg Kristensen and Jeanne Renaud-Mornant in 1980.

== Genera ==
There are three genera:

- Actinarctus Schulz, 1935
- Tanarctus Renaud-Debyser, 1959
- Zioella Renaud-Mornant, 1987
