= Neostygarctus =

Scientific classification
- Kingdom: Animalia
- Phylum: Tardigrada
- Class: Heterotardigrada
- Order: Arthrotardigrada
- Family: Neostygarctidae de Zio Grimaldi, D'Addabbo Gallo & De Lucia Morone, 1987
- Genus: Neostygarctus; Grimaldi de Zio, D'Addabbo Gallo & Morone De Lucia, 1982

Genus of tardigrades

Neostygarctus is a genus of tardigrades. It is the only genus in the family Neostygarctidae. It was named and described by Grimaldi de Zio, D'Addabbo Gallo and Morone De Lucia in 1982.

== Species ==
The genus includes three species:

- Neostygarctus acanthophorus Grimaldi de Zio, D'Addabbo Gallo & Morone De Lucia, 1982
- Neostygarctus lovedeluxe Fujimoto & Miyazaki, 2013, named after a Stand from JoJo's Bizarre Adventure that was in turn named after an album by Sade; the discoverers said that the "hairy appearance of the new species appears as if affected by the power of 'Love Deluxe'".
- Neostygarctus oceanopolis Kristensen, Sørensen, Hansen & Zeppilli, 2015
