= Archechiniscus =

Scientific classification
- Kingdom: Animalia
- Phylum: Tardigrada
- Class: Heterotardigrada
- Order: Arthrotardigrada
- Family: Archechiniscidae; Binda, 1978
- Genus: Archechiniscus; Erich Schulz, 1953

Genus of tardigrades

Archechiniscus is the only genus of tardigrades in the family Archechiniscidae. It was first described by Erich Schulz in 1953.

== Species ==
The genus includes the following species:

- Archechiniscus bahamensis Bartels, Fontoura & Nelson, 2018
- Archechiniscus biscaynei Miller, Clark & Miller, 2012
- Archechiniscus marci Schulz, 1953
- Archechiniscus minutus Grimaldi de Zio & D'Addabbo Gallo, 1987
- Archechiniscus symbalanus Chang & Rho, 1998
