= Coronarctidae =

Scientific classification
- Domain: Eukaryota
- Kingdom: Animalia
- Phylum: Tardigrada
- Class: Heterotardigrada
- Order: Arthrotardigrada
- Family: Coronarctidae; Renaud-Mornant, 1974

Genera
- Coronarctus Renaud-Mornant, 1974; Trogloarctus Villora-Moreno, 1996

Family of tardigrades

The Coronarctidae are a family of tardigrades. The family was first described by Jeanne Renaud-Mornant in 1974.

== Genera ==
The family consists of two genera, Coronarctus and Trogloarctus.
