= Renaudarctidae =

Scientific classification
- Kingdom: Animalia
- Phylum: Tardigrada
- Class: Heterotardigrada
- Order: Arthrotardigrada
- Family: Renaudarctidae; Kristensen & Higgins, 1984

Family of tardigrades

Renaudarctidae are a family of tardigrades. It was first described in 1984 by Reinhardt Kristensen and Robert P. Higgins, and named after biologist Jeanne Renaud-Mornant.

== Genera ==
The genus includes the following species:

- Nodarctus Fujimoto & Yamasaki, 2017
- Renaudarctus Kristensen & Higgins, 1984
