= Neoarctus primigenius =

Scientific classification
- Domain: Eukaryota
- Kingdom: Animalia
- Phylum: Tardigrada
- Class: Heterotardigrada
- Order: Arthrotardigrada
- Family: Neoarctidae (Grimaldi de Zio, D'Addabbo Gallo & Morone De Lucia, 1992)
- Genus: Neoarctus; Grimaldi de Zio, D'Addabbo Gallo & Morone De Lucia, 1992
- Species: N. primigenius

Binomial name
- Neoarctus primigenius Grimaldi de Zio, D'Addabbo Gallo & Morone De Lucia, 1992

Species of tardigrade

Neoarctus primigenius is a species of tardigrade. It is the only species in the genus Neoarctus, which is the only genus in the family Neoarctidae. The genus and species were first described and named by Grimaldi de Zio, D'Addabbo Gallo and Morone De Lucia in 1992. The authors first placed the genus in the family Stygarctidae, but it was moved to a separate family in 1998.

== Description ==
The female holotype is 99 μm long and 36 μm wide.

== Distribution ==
The species has been found at 38 metres depth on the east coast of the island of Sardinia, in the Gulf of Orosei which is part of the Tyrrhenian Sea.
