= Anisonyches =

Scientific classification
- Kingdom: Animalia
- Phylum: Tardigrada
- Class: Heterotardigrada
- Order: Echiniscoidea
- Family: Echiniscoididae
- Subfamily: Echiniscoidinae
- Genus: Anisonyches; Pollock, 1975

Genus of tardigrades

Anisonyches is a genus of tardigrades in the family Echiniscoididae. The genus was first described and named by Leland W. Pollock in 1975. The genus name is a combination of the Greek aniso ("unequal") and onyches ("claws"), since Anisonyches have four claws each on the first three pairs of legs and three claws each on the fourth pair of legs.

== Species ==
According to Degma, Bertolani et Guidetti (2018), this genus includes four species:

- Anisonyches deliquus Chang & Rho, 1998
- Anisonyches diakidius Pollock, 1975
- Anisonyches eleutherensis Bartels, Fontoura & Nelson, 2018
- Anisonyches mauritianus Grimaldi de Zio, D'Addabbo Gallo, Morone De Lucia & Daddabbo, 1987
