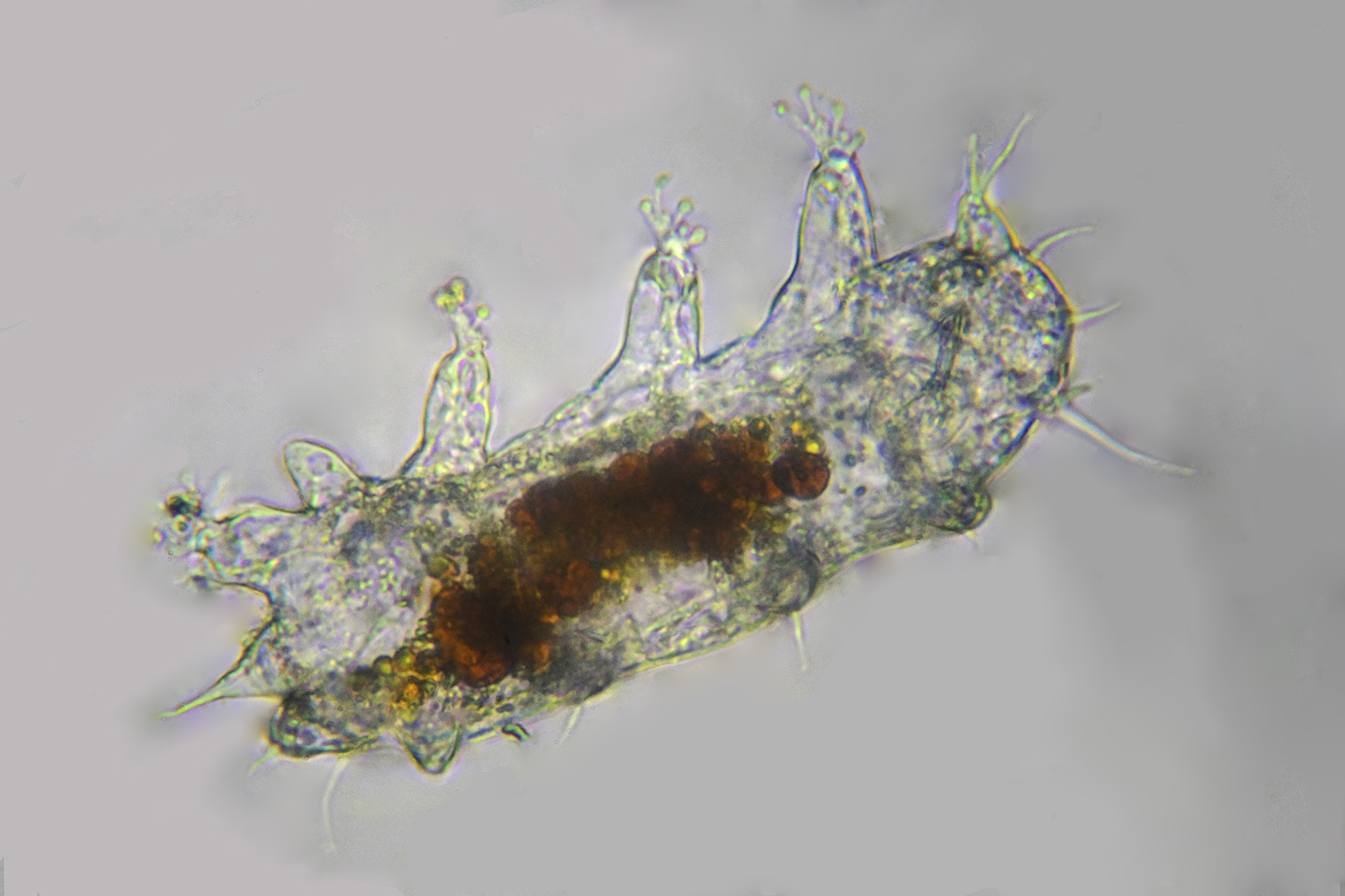
- Batillipes adriaticus

Scientific classification
- Kingdom: Animalia
- Phylum: Tardigrada
- Class: Heterotardigrada
- Order: Arthrotardigrada
- Family: Batillipedidae; Ramazzotti, 1969
- Genus: Batillipes; Richters, 1909

Type species
- Batillipes mirus Richters, 1909

Species
- see text

= Batillipes =

Genus of tardigrades

Batillipes is genus of tardigrades, the only genus in the family Batillipedidae. It was first described by Ferdinand Richters in 1909.

== Species ==
The genus includes the following species:

- Batillipes acaudatus Pollock, 1971
- Batillipes acuticauda Menechella, Bulnes & Cazzaniga, 2015
- Batillipes adriaticus Grimaldi de Zio, Morone De Lucia, D'Addabbo Gallo & Grimaldi, 1979
- Batillipes africanus Morone De Lucia, D'Addabbo Gallo & Grimaldi de Zio, 1988
- Batillipes algharbensis Santos, Rubal, Veiga, da Rocha & Fontoura, 2018
- Batillipes amblypyge Menechella, Bulnes & Cazzaniga, 2017
- Batillipes annulatus de Zio, 1962
- Batillipes brasiliensis Santos, da Rocha, Gomes & Fontoura, 2017
- Batillipes bullacaudatus McGinty & Higgins, 1968
- Batillipes carnonensis Fize, 1957
- Batillipes chandrayaani Vishnudattan, Rubal & Bijoy Nandan, 2024
- Batillipes crassipes Tchesunov & Mokievsky, 1995
- Batillipes dandarae Santos, da Rocha, Gomes & Fontoura, 2017
- Batillipes dicrocercus Pollock, 1970
- Batillipes friaufi Riggin, 1962
- Batillipes gilmartini McGinty, 1969
- Batillipes lesteri Kristensen & Mackness, 2000
- Batillipes lingularum Menechella, Bulnes & Cazzaniga, 2017
- Batillipes littoralis Renaud-Debyser, 1959
- Batillipes longispinosus Chang & Rho, 1997
- Batillipes lusitanus Santos, Rubal, Veiga, da Rocha & Fontoura, 2018
- Batillipes marcelli Morone De Lucia, D'Addabbo Gallo & Grimaldi de Zio, 1988
- Batillipes mirus Richters, 1909
- Batillipes minius Rubal, Veiga, Fontoura & Sousa-Pinto, 2016
- Batillipes noerrevangi Kristensen, 1978
- Batillipes orientalis Chang & Rho, 1997
- Batillipes pennaki Marcus, 1946
- Batillipes philippinensis Chang & Rho, 1997
- Batillipes phreaticus Renaud Debyser, 1959
- Batillipes potiguarensis Santos, da Rocha, Gomes & Fontoura, 2017
- Batillipes roscoffensis Kristensen, 1978
- Batillipes rotundiculus Rho, Min & Chang, 1999
- Batillipes similis Schulz, 1955
- Batillipes solitarius Jørgensen, Boesgaard, Møbjerg & Kristensen, 2014
- Batillipes spinicauda Gallo D'Addabbo, Sandulli & de Zio Grimaldi, 2005
- Batillipes tridentatus Pollock, 1989
- Batillipes tubernatis Pollock, 1971

== Publications ==
- Data related to Batillipes at Wikispecies
- Richters, Tardigraden-Studien. Bericht der Senckenbergische Naturforschenden Gesellschaft, 1909, vol. 40 p. 28-45 (in German)
- Ramazzotti, Il Phylum Tardigrada. Memorie Istituto di Idrobiologia, 1962, vol. 14, p. 1-395. (in Italian)
