= Sivasankaran Bijoy Nandan =

Indian conservation biologist

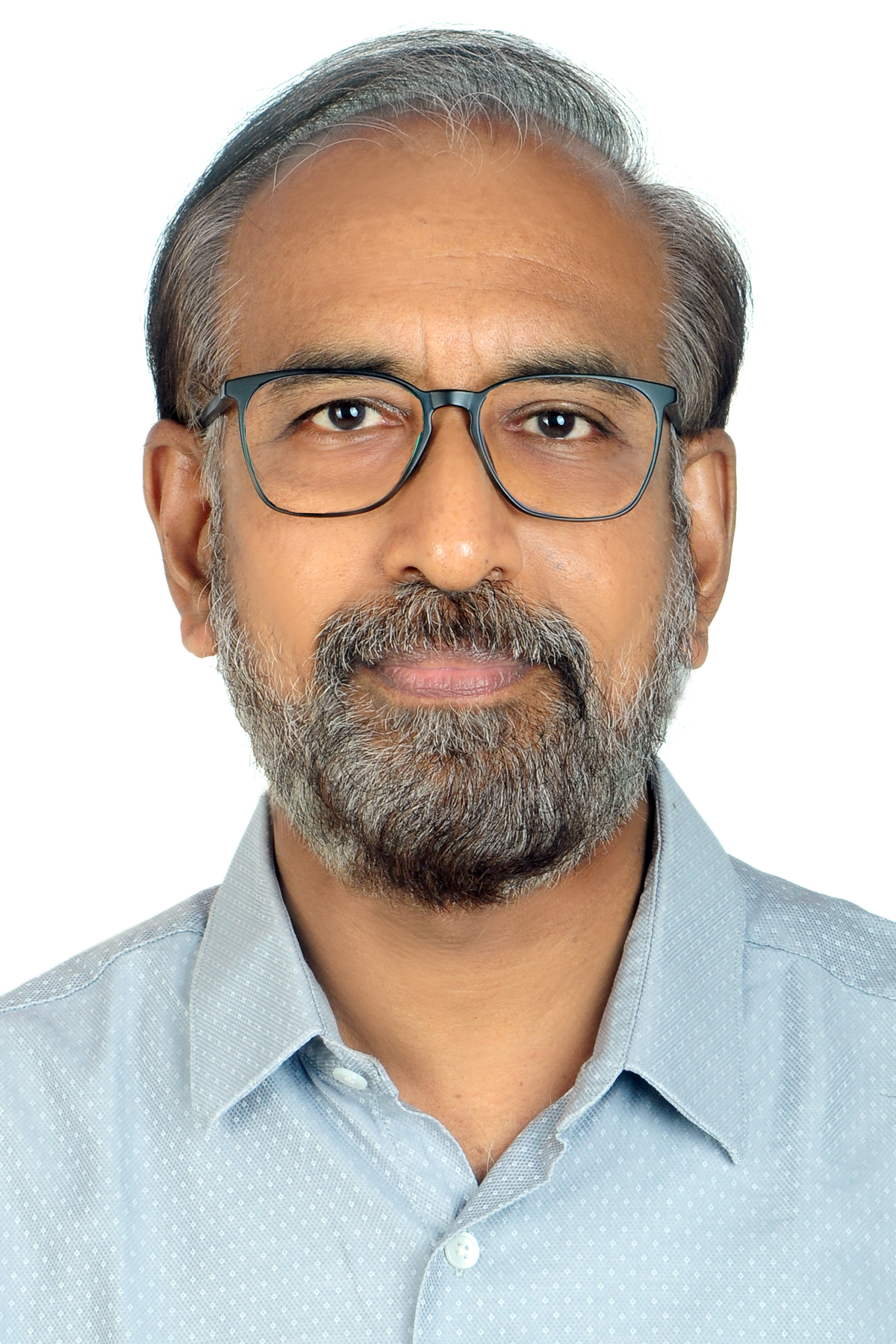
- Born: 26 May 1964 (age 62); Alappuzha, Kerala, India
- Occupations: Professor, CUSAT
- Known for: Aquatic Ecology, Marine Ecology, Wetland Science, Benthic Ecology, Polar Biology, Biogeochemistry, Ecotoxicology, Taxonomy
- Title: Vice Chancellor, Kannur University, Kerala and Dean, Faculty of Marine Sciences, CUSAT
- Board member of: Board of Studies in Marine Biology, CUSAT And Member of Syndicate and Senate, CUSAT
- Awards: Jawaharlal Nehru Award Zoological Society of India Recognition Award 2008 Fulbright Scholar

Academic background
- Education: M.Sc. Zoology, Ph.D. in Aquatic Biology & Fisheries; Post-doctoral position in Aquatic biology & Fisheries (CSIR), Kerala University

Academic work
- Discipline: Aquatic Ecology
- Sub-discipline: Marine biology, Invertebrate zoology, Life sciences, Marine pollution and ecotoxicology
- Institutions: Cochin University of Science and Technology
- Website: https://www.researchgate.net/profile/Sivasankaran-Bijoy-Nandan

Sivasankaran Bijoy Nandan is a professor at the Department of Marine Biology, Microbiology & Biochemistry, School of Marine Sciences, Cochin University of Science & Technology (CUSAT). He currently appointed as Vice Chacellor of Kannur University and holds the office of the Dean, Faculty of Marine Sciences, Cochin University of Science and Technology. He is also syndicate and senate member of CUSAT. He was served as Head of the department, Department of Marine Biology, Microbiology and Biochemistry, CUSAT during 2019 - 2021 period. He has expertise in teaching, research, and development activities in the broad area of Aquatic Ecosystem Characterisation, Conservation, Restoration and Management, Carbon Dynamics & Community Ecology, Communities Ecology & Biology, Eco-toxicology and Biology of Polar Communities. Recently a new species of deep sea wood boring mollusc collected from eastern Arabian Sea named after Prof. Bijoy Nandan as Xylophaga nandani by team of Researchers from Brazil and India namely, Marcel Velásquez, P.R. Jayachandran & M. Jima. Recently, a crab species discovered along the Kerala coast was named Aniptumnus bijoyi in honor of Bijoy, as recognized by Hari, Hershey, and Mendoza in 2022.

The R&D achievements emanated through the financial support garnered from various research and consultancy based projects funded by the national and international agencies. He has been liaising several international collaborations and Memorandum of Understanding (MOU) with reputed national and international institutions for academic advancement in ocean science. In this context, he was also instrumental in organising the Erudite – Scholar in Residence program, Chancellor chair and Fulbright visiting scientist programs.

He authored or co-authored more than 220 journal articles, books, and proceedings and has edited ten books in special volumes. He received Jawaharlal Nehru Award in 1993, instituted by the Indian Council of Agricultural Research and the UNESCO Fellowship, 2008. He is also a U.S. Fulbright Visiting Scholar, Technical Member, Kerala State Pollution Control Board, Fellow of National Institute of Ecology, India and Coordinator of the UGC-SAP programme of the Dept. of Marine Biology. He supervised several students for Doctoral program in CUSAT, Mahatma Gandhi University and MS University. Several new species of marine organisms were described by his team (Leptestheria dumonti, Eulimnadia azisi, Pseudosesarma glabrum, Victoriopisa cusatensis, Horaglanis krishnai, Tortanus minicoyensis, Indosphenia kayalum.

== Employment Record ==
Scientist & Officer in Charge (Head), Central Inland Fisheries Research Institute Centre (ICAR), Govt. of India (1994 to 1999 & 2002 to 2006); Sr. Instructor (Fishery Biology), CIFNET, Govt. of India Cochin (1999- 2002); Reader and associate professor in Marine Biology, Dept. of Marine Biology, Microbiology & Biochemistry, Cochin University of Science & Technology (CUSAT) (2006 to 2012); Professor in Marine Biology, Dept. of Marine Biology, Microbiology & Biochemistry, Cochin University of Science & Technology (2012 September to date); Head, Dept. of Marine Biology, Microbiology & Biochemistry, Cochin University of Science & Technology (2018 March to April 2021). Dean, Faculty of Marine Sciences, Cochin University of Science and Technology (2021 June onwards).

== Professional Experience ==
He has 27 years (continuing) (including post-doctoral research of CSIR for 3yrs & Consultant Marine Biologist in Marine Science Division, King Fahd University of Petroleum and Minerals, Saudi Arabia). International research undertaken: July–August 2003: As Consultant Marine Biologist in the United Nations Compensation Research Project: Studies on the Oceanographic and Biodiversity changes in the Gulf Coast waters, Saudi Arabia in the context of oil pollution due to the Gulf war, Marine Science Division, King Fahd University of Petroleum & Minerals, Saudi Arabia; September, 2013 to January, 2014, As Fulbright Scholar at the College of William and Mary, Virginia Institute of Marine Science, USA teaching and research actions in marine ecology and ecotoxicology and pollution topics under Fulbright grant. Field experience: Indian Ocean, Atlantic and Pacific Oceans, Arctic Ocean, backwaters and estuaries (including sea voyage / cruise): ~ 24 months Teaching:19years (continuing). Administrative: 16 years (continuing) Teaching and research faculty: MSc & PhD program in Marine Biology, MPhil life science, refresher and short-term course, environmental studies (research faculty). Member in professional bodies: 6 national &2 international. Technical Member: Kerala State Pollution Control Board, from February 2011 to April 2014 period, Coordinator, UGC – SAP program, CUSAT, Board of studies chairman, Marine Biology, CUSAT.

== Research projects ==
Soft bottom Meiobenthic fauna as proxies of the Functional character of selected Arctic fjords; Impact of Climate variability on the India Ocean: Role of gelatinous zooplankton structuring food web structure and community assemblages; Ecology and functional diversity of meiofauna in selected Arctic fjords; Functional importance and responses of meiofauna to environmental gradients in the Arctic fjord; Marine Biodiversity and Bioprospecting for sustainable development; Network project on Mission Submarine Groundwater Discharge (SGD).

== Consultancy Projects ==
As CONSULTANT MARINE BIOLOGIST in the United Nations Compensation Research Project: Studies on the Oceanographic and Biodiversity changes in the Gulf Coast waters, Saudi Arabia in the context of oil pollution due to the Gulf war, Marine Science Division, King Fahd University of Petroleum & Minerals, Saudi Arabia; Mumbai Trans Harbour Link (MTHL) project: Study of Flamingos and Migratory Birds: Study of Plankton & Benthic component, funded by Salim Ali Centre for Ornithology and Natural History (SACON), Coimbatore, Ministry of Environment & Forests, India; Environmental Monitoring associated with Development of an International Container Transshipment Terminal at Vallarpadam – Assessment of Mangroves, funded by National Institute of Oceanography, Govt. of India; Fish Kill in Periyar River, funded by Kerala State Pollution Control Board, Govt. of Kerala.

== Funding Agencies ==
Ministry of Earth Sciences (MoES)|National Centre for Coastal Research| National Centre for Earth Science Studies | Department of Biotechnology | Department Of Science & Technology | Kerala State Council for Science, Technology and Environment |Kerala State Biodiversity Board | Department of Environment and Climate Change.
