= Stygarctidae =

Scientific classification
- Domain: Eukaryota
- Kingdom: Animalia
- Phylum: Tardigrada
- Class: Heterotardigrada
- Order: Arthrotardigrada
- Family: Stygarctidae; Schulz, 1951

Genera
- See text

Family of tardigrades

The Stygarctidae are a family of tardigrades. The family was first described by Schulz in 1951. The genus Neoarctus was first placed in the family Stygarctidae, but it was moved to a separate family, Neoarctidae, in 1998.

== Subfamilies and genera ==
They are divided into the following subfamilies and genera:

- Megastygarctidinae Bello & de Zio Grimaldi, 1998:
  - Megastygarctides McKirdy, Schmidt & McGinty-Bayly, 1976
- Stygarctinae Schulz, 1951:
  - Faroestygarctus Hansen, Kristensen & Jørgensen, 2012
  - Mesostygarctus Renaud-Mornant, 1979
  - Parastygarctus Renaud-Debyser, 1965
  - Prostygarctus Rubal, Veiga, Fontoura & Sousa-Pinto, 2013
  - Pseudostygarctus McKirdy, Schmidt & McGinty-Bayly, 1976
  - Stygarctus Schulz, 1951
