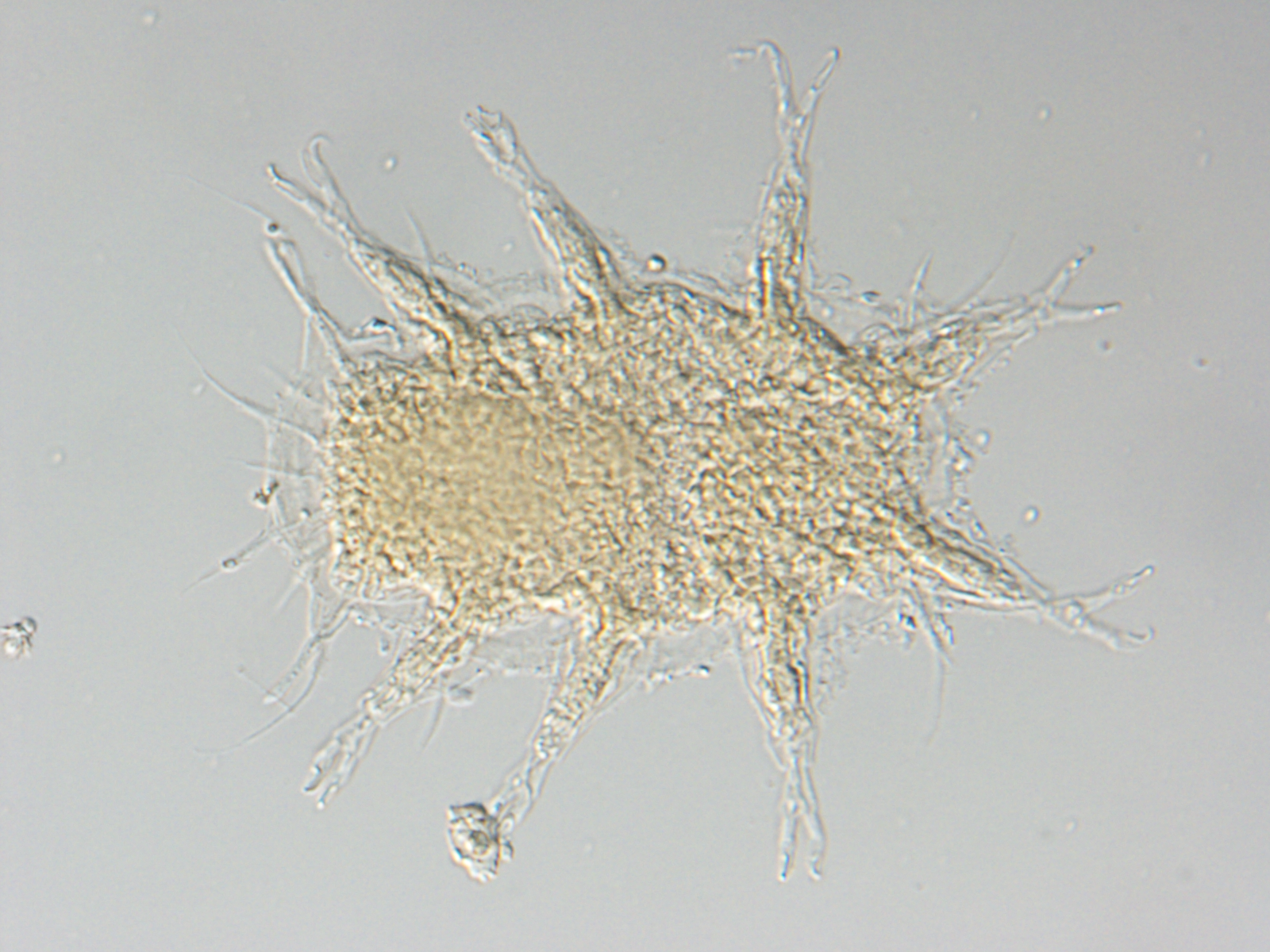
- Paradoxipus orzeliscoides

Scientific classification
- Domain: Eukaryota
- Kingdom: Animalia
- Phylum: Tardigrada
- Class: Heterotardigrada
- Order: Arthrotardigrada
- Family: Halechiniscidae; Thulin, 1928

= Halechiniscidae =

Family of tardigrades

The Halechiniscidae are a family of tardigrades. The family was named and first described by Gustav Thulin in 1928.

== Subfamilies and genera ==
They are divided into the following subfamilies and genera:

- Dipodarctinae Pollock, 1995
  - Dipodarctus Pollock, 1995
- Euclavarctinae Renaud-Mornant, 1983
  - Clavarctus Renaud-Mornant, 1983
  - Euclavarctus Renaud-Mornant, 1975
  - Exoclavarctus Renaud-Mornant, 1983
  - Moebjergarctus Bussau, 1992
  - Parmursa Renaud-Mornant, 1984
  - Proclavarctus Renaud-Mornant, 1983
- Florarctinae Renaud-Mornant, 1982
  - Florarctus Delamare Deboutteville & Renaud-Mornant, 1965
  - Ligiarctus Renaud-Mornant, 1982
  - Wingstrandarctus Kristensen, 1984
- Halechiniscinae Thulin, 1928
  - Chrysoarctus Renaud-Mornant, 1984
  - Halechiniscus Richters, 1908
- Orzeliscinae Schulz, 1963
  - Mutaparadoxipus Gross, Miller & Hochberg, 2014
  - Opydorscus Renaud-Mornant, 1989
  - Orzeliscus du Bois-Reymond Marcus, 1952
  - Paradoxipus Kristensen & Higgins, 1989
- Quisarctinae Fujimoto, 2015
  - Quisarctus Fujimoto, 2015
