= Jeanne Renaud-Mornant =

French biologist

- Occupation: biologist
- Known for: work with meiofauna; discovery of ghost-larva
- Scientific career
- Fields: meiofauna

Jeanne Renaud-Mornant, Born Jeanne Renaud, Jeanne Renaud-Debyser before her second marriage (8 August 1925 Vellexon – 18 September 2012, Paris) was a French biologist specialising in meiofauna.

== Biography ==
Jeanne Renaud-Mornant began her career in 1951 and quickly became interested in meiofauna, a fauna compartment defined by Mare in 1942 consisting of small benthic metazoans smaller than a millimetre in size. She obtained a Fulbright scholarship in 1953 to continue her studies in Florida, and obtained her doctoral thesis at the Sorbonne in 1961. Soon after, she participated in the first international conference on meiofauna in Tunis and became increasingly involved in the scientific community by contributing to the creation of the International Association of Meiobenthologists that she chaired in 1976-1977 and participating in the editorial board of the official newsletter of the IAM: Psamonalia. She was particularly noted for her work with Tardigrada.

In 1967, her work caused her to be asked by the National Museum of Natural History in Paris to assume charge of the national collection of "Vers libres" ("Free worms") in which Renaud-Mornant added in 1986, the meiofauna section that is today a full collection consisting of specimens of free-living marine nematodes of Gastrotricha, Kinorhyncha, Tardigrades, Turbellaria, rotifers, annelids, and various minor groups such as Loricifera. She also participated in the staging of the meiofauna space of the Gallery of Evolution.

In 1986, Renaud-Mornant discovered a reduced type of larva known as a "ghost-larva".

A recognised morphologist, Jeanne Renaud-Mornant also participated in many activities in the areas of eco-physiology, and phylogeny of meiofauna. She described many species of mystacocarides and gastrotrichs and 56 species, 15 genera and five new families and families in tardigrades (Coronarctidae, Euclavarctinae, Florarctinae ...).

== Some taxa named in her honour ==
- Sphaerosyllis renaudae Hartmann-Schroder, 1958
- Paracharon renaudae Coineau, 1968
- Stilestrongylus renaudae Durette-Desset, 1970
- Chromaspirina renaudae Boucher, 1975
- Renaudcypris McKenzie, 1980
- Renaudcyprinae McKenzie, 1980
- Renaudarctus Kristensen & Higgins, 1984
- Renaudarctidae Kristensen & Higgins, 1984
- Syringolaimus renaudae Gourbault & Vincx, 1985
- Inanidrilus renaudae Erséus, 1985
- Thaumastoderma renaudae Kisielewski, 1988
- Parastygarctus renaudae Grimaldi de Zio, D’Addabbo Gallo, Morone De Lucia & Daddabbo, 1987
- Rugiloricus renaudae Kristensen, Neves & Gad, 2013
