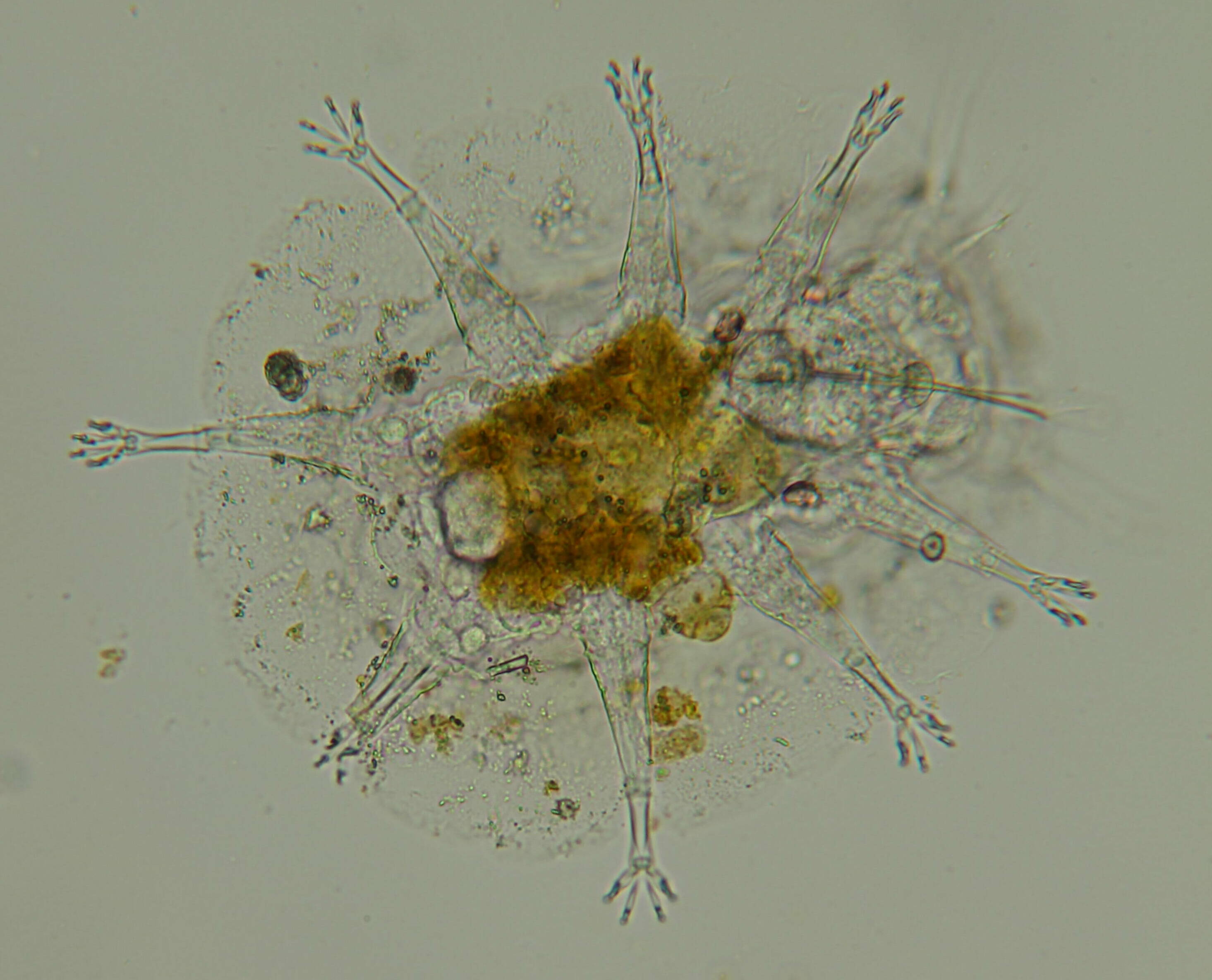
- Florarctus sp.

Scientific classification
- Kingdom: Animalia
- Phylum: Tardigrada
- Class: Heterotardigrada
- Order: Arthrotardigrada; Marcus, 1927

Families
- See text

= Arthrotardigrada =

Order of tardigrades

Arthrotardigrada are an order of tardigrades, first described by Ernst Marcus in 1927.

In 2018, a report integrating multiple morphological and molecular studies concluded that the Arthrotardigrada appear to be paraphyletic.

== Families ==
Arthrotardigrada consists of the following families:

- Anisonychidae
- Archechiniscidae
- Batillipedidae
- Coronarctidae
- Halechiniscidae
- Neoarctidae
- Neostygarctidae
- Renaudarctidae
- Stygarctidae
- Styraconyxidae
- Tanarctidae
