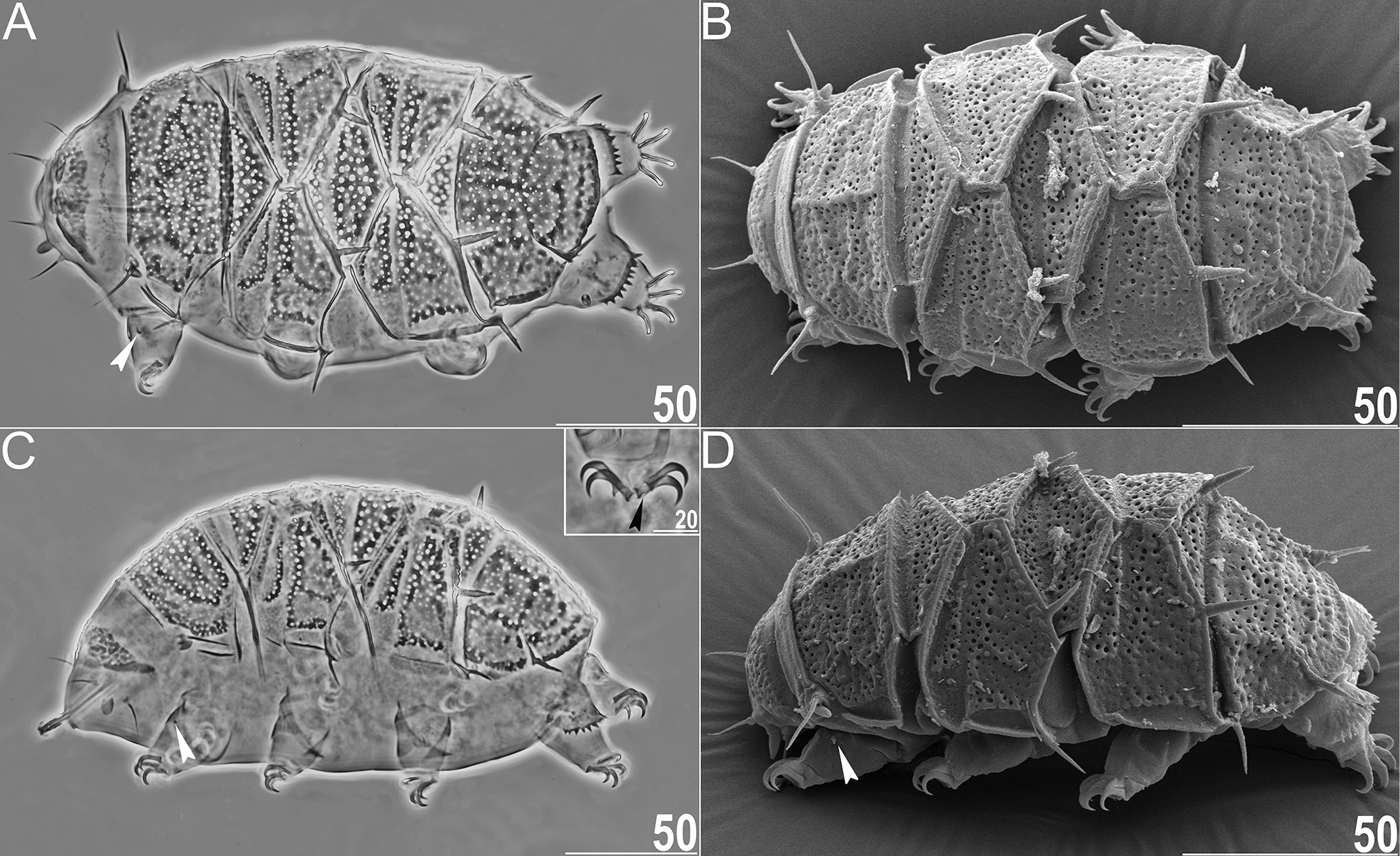
- Echiniscus succineus under PCM (left) and SEM (right)

Scientific classification
- Domain: Eukaryota
- Kingdom: Animalia
- Phylum: Tardigrada
- Class: Heterotardigrada; Marcus, 1927

Families
- Order Arthrotardigrada; Archechiniscidae; Batillipedidae; Coronarctidae; Halechiniscidae; Neoarctidae; Neostygarctidae; Renaudarctidae; Stygarctidae; Styraconyxidae; Tanarctidae; Order Echiniscoidea; Carphaniidae; Echiniscidae; Echiniscoididae; Oreellidae

= Heterotardigrada =

Class of tardigrades

Heterotardigrades (class Heterotardigrada) is a class of the tardigrades (water bears) that have cephalic appendages and legs with four separate but similar digits or claws on each. 444 species have been described.

== Anatomy ==
The anatomy of the reproductive system is an important defining feature in distinguishing the different groups of tardigrades. Heterotardigrades have gonoducts that open to the outside through a preanal gonopore, rather than opening into the rectum as in the Eutardigrada.

== Ecology ==
Some orders of heterotardigrades are marine, others are terrestrial, but as for all tardigrades, all are aquatic in the sense that they must be surrounded by at least a film of moisture in order to be active – though they can survive in a dormant state if the habitat dries out.
